= Jisaburō Ozawa =

Japanese admiral (1886–1966)

- 小沢 治三郎
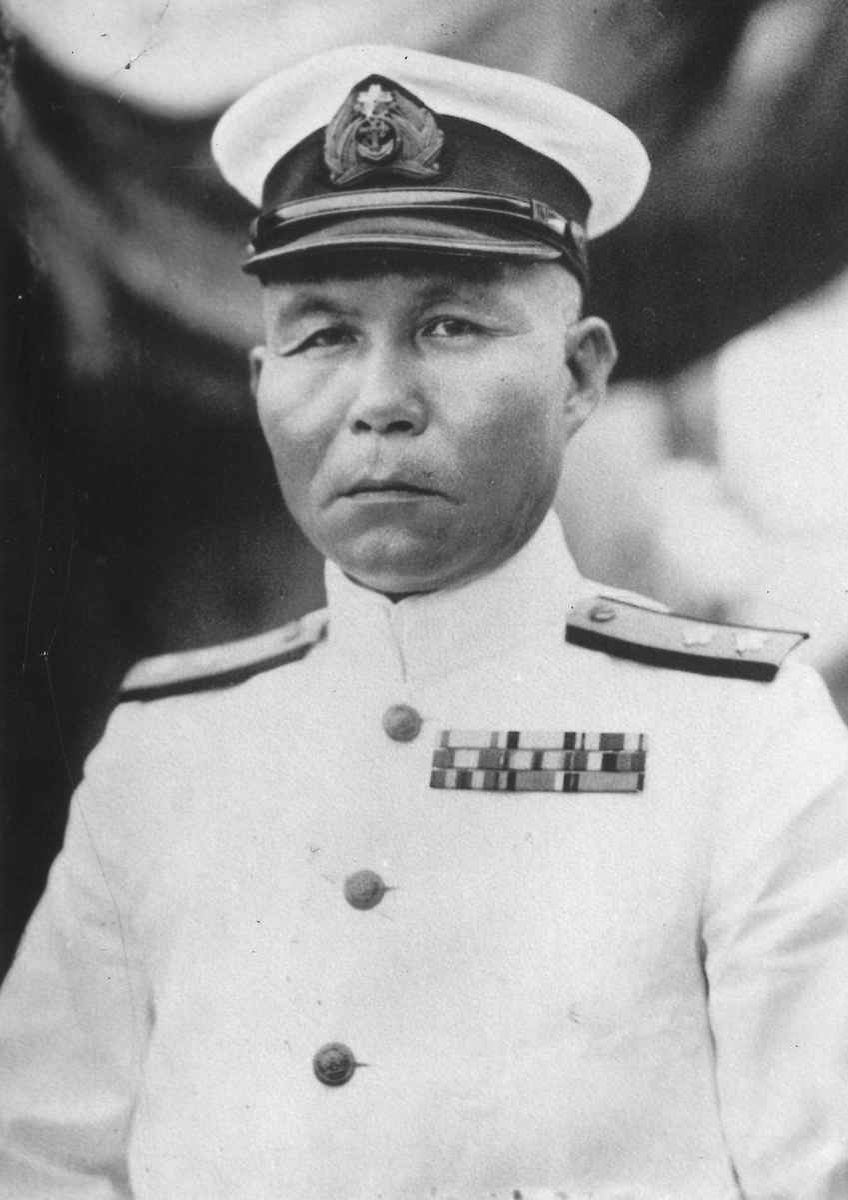
- Born: October 2, 1886; Koyu District, Miyazaki, Japan
- Died: November 9, 1966 (aged 80); Japan
- Military career
- Allegiance: Empire of Japan
- Branch: Imperial Japanese Navy
- Service years: 1909–1945
- Rank: Vice Admiral (refused a promotion to full Admiral)
- Nickname: "Gargoyle" (Onigawara)
- Commands: Take, Shimakaze, Destroyer No. 3, 1st Destroyer Division, 4th Destroyer Division, 11th Destroyer Division, Maya, Haruna, 8th Squadron, Naval Torpedo School, 1st Carrier Division, 3rd Squadron, Naval War College, 1st Southern Expeditionary Fleet, 3rd Fleet, 1st Mobile Fleet, Vice-chief of Navy General Staff, Combined Fleet, Maritime Escort Fleet
- Conflicts: World War II; Pacific War; Malayan Campaign; Dutch East Indies Campaign; Battle of the Philippine Sea; Battle of Leyte Gulf

Vice-Admiral Jisaburō Ozawa (小沢 治三郎, Ozawa Jisaburō; October 2, 1886 – November 9, 1966) was an admiral in the Imperial Japanese Navy during World War II. Ozawa held several important commands at sea throughout the duration of the conflict (Southern Expeditionary Fleet, 3rd Fleet, 1st Mobile Fleet, and the Combined Fleet).

Ozawa was noted for his innovative ideas in the employment of aircraft carriers. However, he could not, in his most important commands from 1943 onward, succeed in overcoming the superiority of American carrier aviation. In terms of quantity and quality of aircraft, as well as pilot training and experience, the Americans outmatched the Japanese carrier forces under Ozawa's command. Ozawa commanded Japanese carrier forces during some of the most significant naval battles that took place in the Pacific Theatre: the Battle of the Philippine Sea and the Battle of Leyte Gulf. He was the last Commander-in-Chief of the Combined Fleet.

Ozawa has been noted for his unusual height for a Japanese man of his time period, measuring in at over 6 feet (1.8 m) tall, although his exact height has not been reliably reported. (Note: Ozawa certainly was tall for a Japanese man of his era; Gluck describied him as being "over six feet" tall. However, a later source citing Gluck converted that to 2 meters (6 ft 7 in), potentially resulting in later sources (including Wikipedia for fifteen years) reporting his height as 6 feet 7 inches (2.01 m).)

== Biography ==
=== Career prior to World War II ===
Jisaburō Ozawa was born in 1886 in Miyazaki District, a rural area of Koyu County, Kyūshū Island, Japan.

Ozawa graduated in 1909 from the Imperial Japanese Naval Academy in the 37th class, he was ranked 45th out of 179 students. He served as a midshipman on the ex-Russian protected cruiser Soya Varyag, on the pre-dreadnought battleship Mikasa and on the cruiser Kasuga. He was appointed Ensign 2nd class in late 1910, and promoted to Ensign 1st class in late 1912. He served on the destroyer Arare, the battlecruiser Hiei, and the cruiser Chitose. Promoted to lieutenant in late 1915, he served on the dreadnought battleship Kawachi. He specialized in torpedo tactics and served on the destroyer Hinoki. He graduated from the Naval War College (19th class) in 1921. Promoted to lieutenant commander on December 1, 1921, he embarked on the destroyer Take, then joined the staff of the Mako Guard District in the Penghu Islands. He then served on the destroyers Shimakaze and Asakaze. He served as a torpedo officer on the battleship Kongō in 1925, then joined the staff of the 1st Fleet. He was promoted to commander on December 1, 1926. He joined the Naval District of Yokosuka in 1927, then served as an instructor at the Torpedo Naval Service School and the Naval Gunnery School. He later served on the armored cruiser Kasuga in 1928–1929, which had been converted into a training ship. In 1930, he visited the United States and Europe and was promoted to captain on December 1, 1930.

He commanded the 1st, 4th and 11th Destroyer Groups. From 1932 to 1934 he served as an instructor at the Naval War College and at the Army War College. At the end of 1934 he was given command of the heavy cruiser Maya, and the following year of the battleship Haruna.

On December 1, 1936, he was promoted to rear admiral. He taught at the Naval War College in 1936, then held various staff positions, including Chief of Staff of the Combined Fleet in 1937. At the end of 1937, he took command of the 8th Cruiser Division (the cruisers Nagara, Sendai and Jintsū), then, at the end of 1939, the 1st Carrier Division (aircraft carriers Akagi and Kaga). He was one of the main designers of Japanese naval aviation tactics.

He was the first high-ranking officer to recommend that carrier forces be brought together in an Air Fleet so that they could train and fight together. This would eventually lead to the creation of 1st Air Fleet, also known as the Kidō Butai, a combined carrier battle group comprising most of Japan's carriers. On 10 April 1941, Vice-Admiral Chūichi Nagumo was appointed commander-in-chief of the First Air Fleet. Many contemporaries and historians have doubted his suitability for this command, given his lack of familiarity with naval aviation. Admiral Nishizō Tsukahara would say that: "He (Nagumo) was wholly unfitted by background, training, experience, and interest for a major role in Japan’s naval air arm." Nagumo was appointed by the Navy General Staff, rather than the Combined Fleet. Ozawa was Admiral Isoroku Yamamoto's choice for the command of First Air Fleet, but Yamamoto did not have a strong enough case to remove Nagumo.

On 1 November 1940, he took command of the 3rd Battleship Division (the Kongō and Haruna, Hiei and Kirishima).

He was promoted to vice admiral on November 15, 1940, his final rank. In June 1941, he became the director of the Naval War College.

== World War II ==
=== 1st Southern Expeditionary Fleet ===
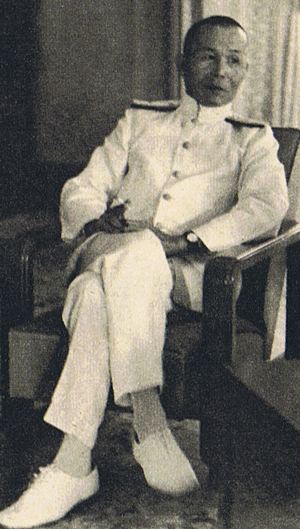
Ozawa as Commander-in-Chief of the Southern Expeditionary Force, November 16, 1941, at Saigon.

Vice-Admiral Ozawa was appointed as Commander-in-Chief of the Southern Expeditionary Fleet on October 18, 1941, giving him responsibility for naval operations in the South China Sea. After the attack on Pearl Harbor, he oversaw naval operations relating to the invasion of Malaya and the invasion of Thailand. Ozawa planned and successfully completed simultaneous landing operations at both Kota Bahru and Songkhla on December 8 without being intercepted by the British Eastern Fleet. On December 9, Ozawa learned of Force Z's location through Japanese submarines. Ozawa's fleet of cruisers and destroyers sortied to intercept Force Z, hoping to engage it in a night battle which never occurred. On the morning of December 10, while Force Z tried to intercept Ozawa's fleet it was attacked by land-based aircraft of the Japanese navy, resulting in the sinking of battleship HMS Prince of Wales and battlecruiser HMS Repulse. The loss of two major capital ships severely weakened the British Eastern Fleet, which contributed greatly to British defeat in Malaya and the fall of Singapore.

From January to March 1942, his fleet supported the invasions of Java and Sumatra, the main islands of the Dutch East Indies. On March 1, 1942, the Southern Expeditionary Fleet was re-designated as the 1st Southern Expeditionary Fleet.

In April 1942, Vice-Admiral Nagumo of the Combined Fleet launched a raid on Ceylon (Sri Lanka) against the British Eastern Fleet, code-named Operation C. At the same time, Vice-Admiral Ozawa, commanding the Malay Force, launched a separate operation against Allied merchant ships in the Bay of Bengal. In this operation, Ozawa commanded a fleet of four Mogami-class heavy cruisers of the 7th Cruiser Division under Vice Admiral Takeo Kurita, his flagship the heavy cruiser Chōkai, the aircraft carrier Ryūjō, a light cruiser and four destroyers.

In 3 days, Ozawa's force managed to sink 23 merchant ships (20 in a single day), totaling over 130,000 gross registered tons. In addition, April saw 32,000 tons of shipping sunk by Japanese submarines off India's west coast. Ryūjō's aircraft also bombed the ports of Cocanada and Vizagapatam, causing relatively minor damage. The tonnage and number of ships sunk by Ozawa's force, are comparable to that of the 3-month long Operation Berlin raid conducted by two battleships of the Kriegsmarine from January to March 1941. In both raids against merchant shipping, Allied merchant ships were not sailing in convoys escorted by large vessels.

=== Command of the 3rd Fleet (November 1942–March 1944) ===
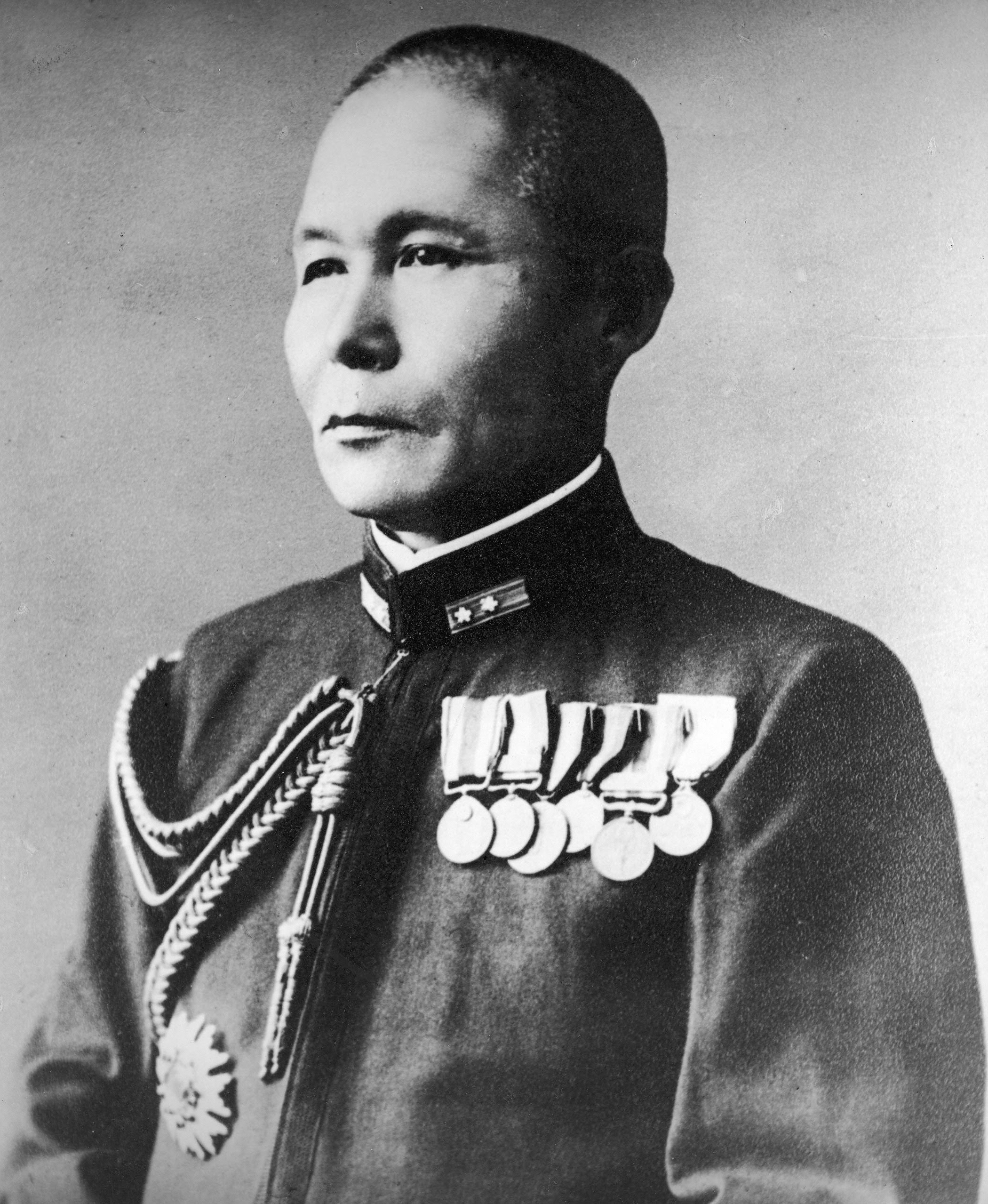
Ozawa as a Vice Admiral, 1940s

Four months later, on November 11, 1942, Vice-Admiral Ozawa was given command of the 3rd Fleet, replacing Vice-Admiral Nagumo who was reassigned to a shore command in Sasebo after his forces were defeated at the Battle of Midway.

The 3rd Fleet was set up as an aircraft carrier task force. In July 1942 it comprised

- The large, fast carriers Shōkaku and Zuikaku, which made up the 1st Carrier Division. Both took part in the attack on Pearl Harbor, but neither were present at the Battle of Midway.
- The light aircraft carrier Zuihō, which was present at the Battle of Midway, but did not participate in the engagement of June 4, 1942, which had ended disastrously for the Japanese.
- The two Hiyō-class aircraft carriers, which were converted from ocean liners. The Hiyō-class carriers joined the fleet in mid-1942.
- The light aircraft carrier Ryūhō. The Ryūhō together with the two Hiyō-class carriers constituted the 2nd Carrier Division.

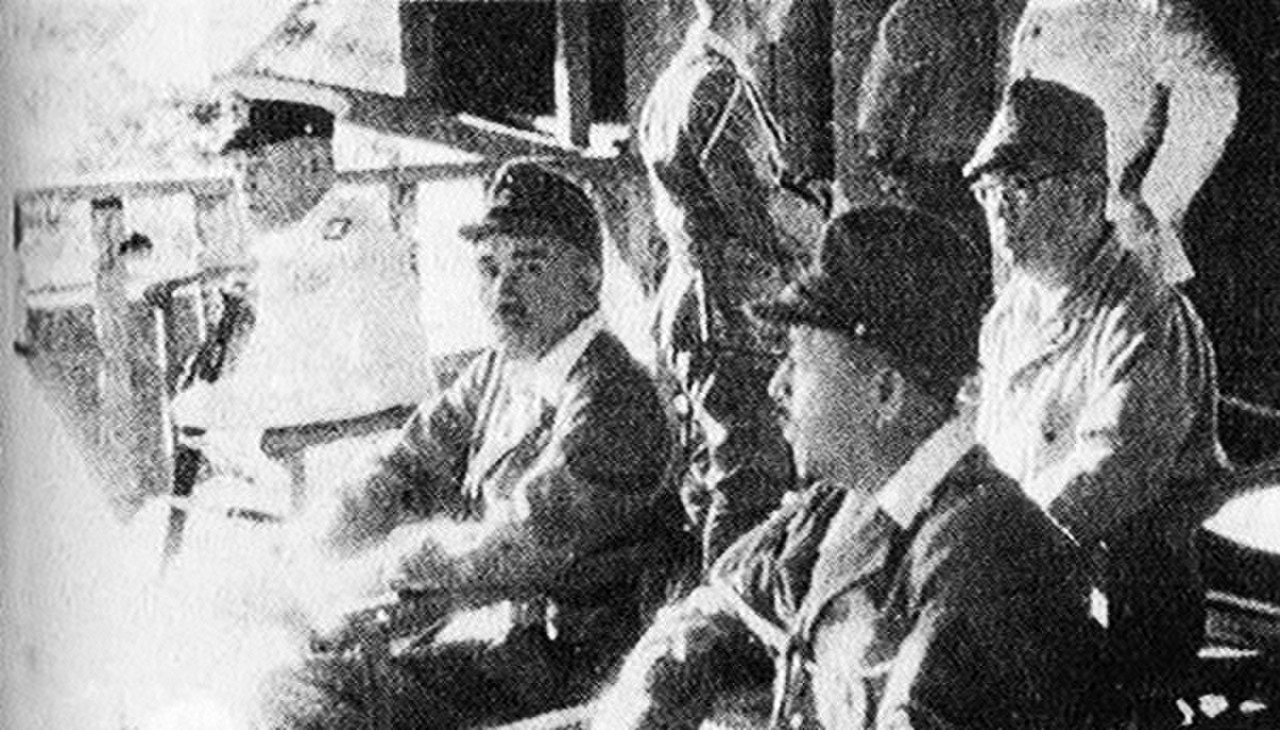
Isoroku Yamamoto (far left) and Jinichi Kusaka (center left) supervise air operations from Rabaul during Operation I-Go in April 1943

The priority for the Imperial Japanese Navy was the construction of new aircraft carriers and the training of new pilots. This task was the responsibility of Admiral Mineichi Koga, then commander-in-chief of the Yokosuka Naval District. The IJN desperately needed to replace the heavy losses suffered by their carrier forces at Midway and the Battle of the Santa Cruz Islands. The 3rd Fleet was therefore conserved and not fully committed during the Naval Battle of Guadalcanal. Meanwhile, the USS Enterprise, which had been damaged in the Santa Cruz Islands, was quickly repaired and sent into action. At Guadalcanal the Enterprise was able to contribute to the destruction of the fast battleship Hiei and heavy cruiser Kinugasa in November 1942.

The 3rd Fleet took part in covering the largely successful evacuation of Japanese forces from Guadalcanal on 26 January 1943.

In April 1943, under the orders of Admiral Yamamoto, Commander-in-Chief of the Combined Fleet, many aircraft of the 3rd Fleet were momentarily transferred ashore, to take part in Operation I-Go. Launched from Rabaul, Bougainville and the Shortland Islands, I-Go was an aerial counter-offensive consisting of the bombardments of Guadalcanal, Port Moresby, Oro Bay and Milne Bay in New Guinea. The results of I-Go were inconclusive, but the losses suffered by Japanese carrier aircraft (including that of the 3rd Fleet) against American fighter aircraft were severe. Of the 350 aircraft that took part in I-Go, 55 were destroyed.

From September to October 1943, the 3rd Fleet unsuccessfully attempted to intercept American carrier forces which had carried out air raids on Tarawa, Makin, Wake Island and the Marshall Islands. After the massive American air attacks on Rabaul in November 1943 and on Truk in February 1944, the 3rd Fleet withdrew to safer anchorage of the Lingga Islands in Sumatran waters, near Singapore. During this period the light aircraft carriers of the Chitose class, which were converted from two seaplane tenders, joined the 3rd Fleet. Chiyoda joined at the end of 1943, and Chitose joined at the beginning of 1944. The two Chitose-class carriers along with Zuihō formed the 3rd Carrier Division.

A reorganization of the Japanese naval forces took place at the beginning of 1944. The Combined Fleet was replaced as an operational unit by the 1st Mobile Fleet, which Vice-Admiral Ozawa was given command of on 1 March 1944. The large new aircraft carrier Taihō was put into action and joined the 1st Carrier Division on April 5. On April 15, Taihō became Vice-Admiral Ozawa's flagship.

=== Command of the 1st Mobile Fleet and the Battle of the Philippine Sea ===
In June 1944 the Imperial Japanese Navy was able to field nine aircraft carriers (3 fleet carriers and 6 light carriers) in a single operational formation, more than it had ever fielded before. Together they were equipped with nearly 500 aircraft. Some carried Japan's newest aircraft models, most notably the "Zero" model A6M5, the dive bomber Yokosuka D4Y "Judy" and the torpedo bomber B6N "Jill". Some ships, in particular the light aircraft carriers, did not carry the "Judy".

However, the industrial power of the United States was such that the American Third Fleet of the Central Pacific (nicknamed the "Big Blue Fleet") was able to operate more carriers than the Japanese. The main striking force of the US Navy, Vice Admiral Mitscher's Fast Carrier Task Force alone consisted of seven carriers, eight light aircraft carriers, seven modern battleships and sixteen large cruisers. In addition, American carrier aircraft at that point, including the Grumman F6F "Hellcat" fighter, were as capable, if not even more so, than the newest Japanese aircraft models.

Above all, the superiority of American carriers at this point of the war was due to better training of carrier pilots and crewmen. American pilots and deck teams greatly benefited from the training provided by two "training aircraft carriers" USS Sable and USS Wolverine, converted from side-wheel steamer cruise ships. These two training carriers operated in the safe waters of the American Great Lakes. Meanwhile, Japanese training sorties on the high seas were constantly under threat from US submarines. While Chitose was at sea off Tawi-Tawi, conducting air training on 22 May 1944, the American submarine USS Puffer fired a spread of torpedoes at her, but they exploded in her wake and she escaped damage. At the end of May 1944, as the 1st Mobile Fleet anchored at Tawi-Tawi, Vice-Admiral Ozawa was forced to prohibit training sorties on the open ocean.

In the Battle of the Philippine Sea, the 1st Mobile Fleet was organized into three forces, similar to American task forces, bringing together aircraft carriers and surface combatants:

- "A" Force, commanded by Vice-Admiral Ozawa personally, consisted of the 1st Aircraft Carrier Division, two heavy cruisers of the 5th Cruiser Division (Myōkō and Haguro), a light cruiser and six destroyers.
- "B" Force, commanded by Rear Admiral Jōjima, consisted of the 2nd Aircraft Carrier Division, the battleship Nagato, the heavy cruiser Mogami and ten destroyers.
- "C" Force, commanded by Vice Admiral Kurita, consisted of the 3rd Aircraft Carrier Division, the 1st and 3rd Battleship Divisions (Yamato and Musashi, Kongō and Haruna), eight heavy cruisers (all four of the Takao class, two of the Mogami class and both of the Tone class), one light cruiser and seven destroyers.

On June 10, the 1st Battleship Division, under Vice-Admiral Matome Ugaki, set sail from Tawi-Tawi to reinforce the defense of the island of Biak northwest of New Guinea, which was under attack by Allied amphibious forces. Arriving at Batjan on June 12, the division was joined by the two cruisers of the 5th Cruiser Division. By then American bombardments had begun on the Mariana Islands, triggering Plan A-Go, and Vice Admiral Ugaki was ordered to sail the 1st Mobile Fleet, which was on its way west from Saipan, to the Philippine Sea on June 17.

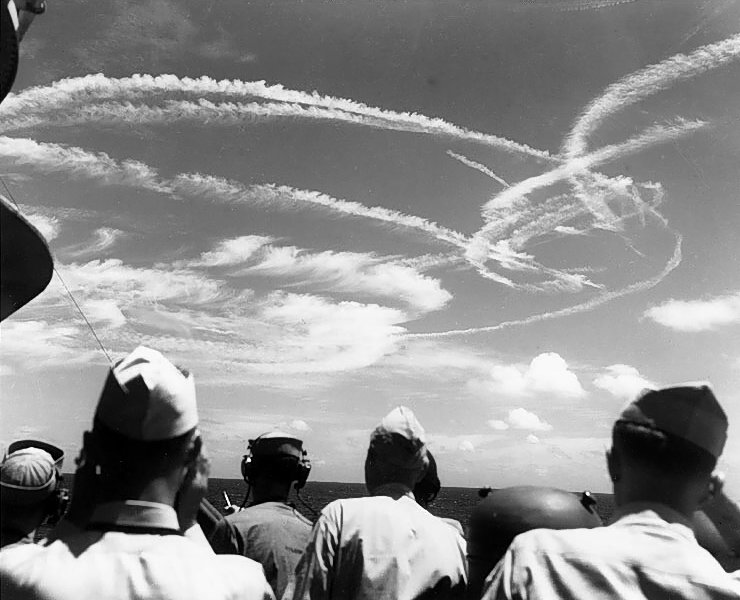
Contrails from American and Japanese aircraft during the Battle of the Philippine Sea, as seen from USS Birmingham, June 1944

The idea of the Japanese maneuver (A-Go) was to seek a "decisive battle" with American naval forces providing aerial cover for landings on the Mariana Islands, particularly on Saipan, after Japanese land-based aircraft had weakened them. However, it was American carrier aircraft that struck first. On June 11, the Japanese-held airfields of Rota, Saipan, Tinian and Guam were attacked, resulting in 60% of the 250 aircraft based there being destroyed. Then on June 14, the airfields of Iwo Jima and Chichi Jima were also attacked. Trusting overly optimistic reports received from Vice-Admiral Kakuta, commanding the 1st Air Fleet (which consisted of land-based naval aircraft), Vice-Admiral Ozawa planned to take advantage of the greater range of his aircraft, and of westerly trade winds. On June 18, Ozawa sent Vice-Admiral Kurita's "C" Force 150 km to the east as a vanguard. On the evening of June 18, the 1st Mobile Fleet was detected by American submarines, and Admiral Nimitz was able to locate it 560 km west-southwest of Saipan. Admiral Spruance chose to wait for the impending Japanese attack. He deployed his fast battleships to form a long-range anti-aircraft screen but did not authorize Vice Admiral Mitscher to intercept the 1st Mobile Fleet, so as to not risk being forced to retreat, which would have put the amphibious forces landing at Saipan at greater risk.

On the morning of June 19, the first wave of attack was launched by the 3rd Aircraft Carrier Division of Force "C", without coordination with the other forces, inflicting only minimal damage to the battleship USS South Dakota at a heavy cost. Of the about 70 planes that took part in the raid, 40 were shot down. A second wave was launched shortly after by the bulk of the Japanese forces. It had almost twice as many aircraft but did not achieve any significant results. Out of almost 130 aircraft engaged, nearly 100 were shot down by anti-aircraft fire and carrier aircraft.

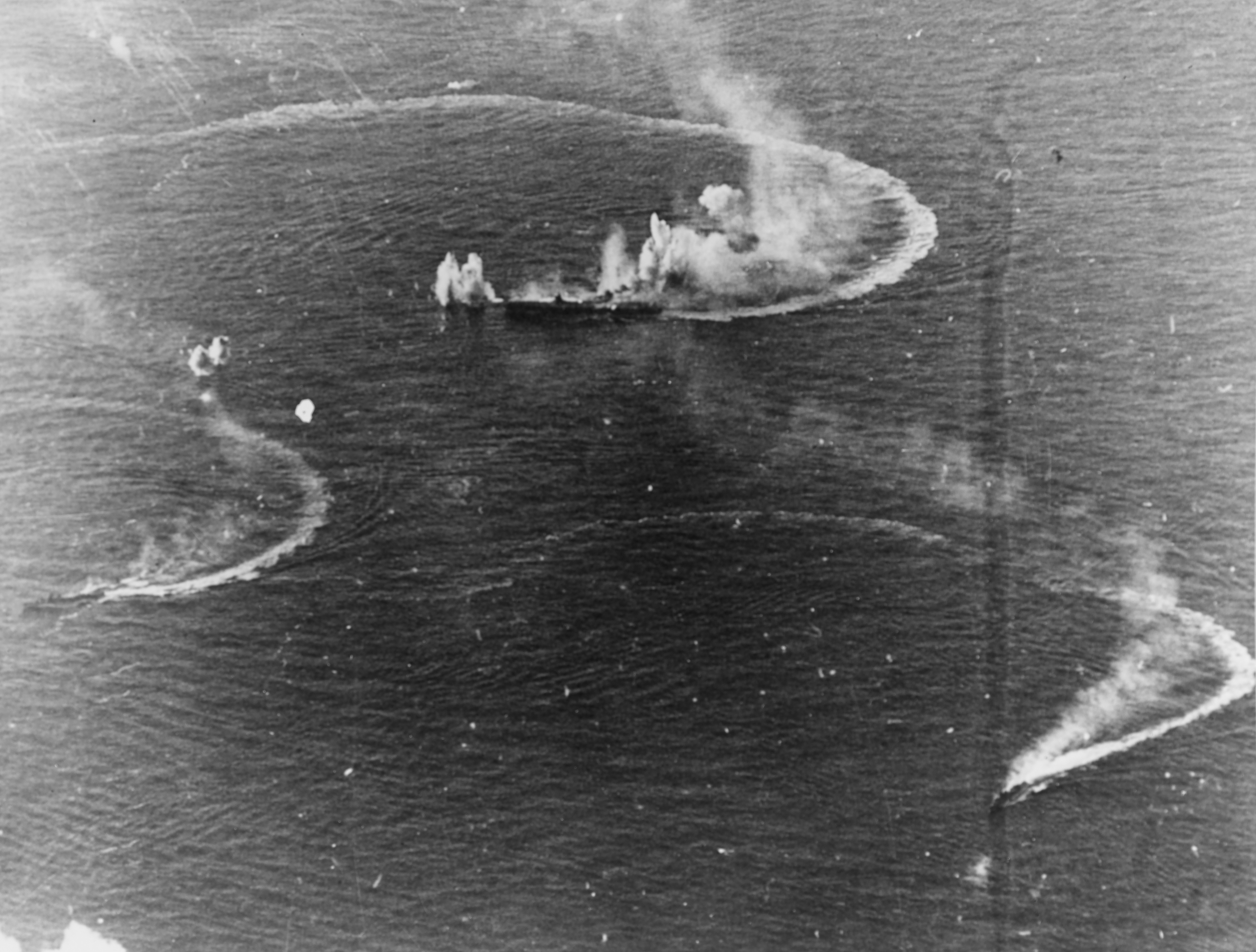
Zuikaku (center) and two destroyers under attack by US Navy carrier aircraft, June 20, 1944

Later that morning, two critical blows were dealt to the 1st Mobile Fleet by two Gato-class submarines, USS Albacore and USS Cavalla. Albacore torpedoed the flagship Taihō, forcing Vice-Admiral Ozawa to transfer to the cruiser Haguro, and Cavalla torpedoed the aircraft carrier Shokaku. The two aircraft carriers sank on the afternoon of June 19 due to aviation gas fires and explosions. Despite the efforts of the damage control teams, the carriers sank in part due to the volatility of the poor-quality aviation fuel that the Japanese were forced to use. The Japanese suffered serious losses: in addition to the two fleet carriers sunk, 90% of the approximately 80 planes of the fourth wave were shot down. By late afternoon, the Mobile Fleet retreated northwest to rejoin their tankers, and the American fleet did not pursue them. The aerial part of the battle was nicknamed the "Great Marianas Turkey Shoot" by American aviators for the severely disproportional loss ratio inflicted upon Japanese aircraft by American pilots and anti-aircraft gunners.

On June 20, although only a third of the 326 aircraft launched returned to his carriers, Vice-Admiral Ozawa aboard his last major carrier, Zuikaku, believed the excessively optimistic reports of his surviving airmen about the damage inflicted on the American aircraft carriers. In addition, he had a number of planes on Guam and Rota. When he learned of an intercepted message indicating that the American fleet did not know where the Japanese fleet was, he began planning for a new raid. However, by around 3:40 p.m., the Japanese fleet was spotted by American reconnaissance aircraft 220 nautical miles northwest of the American fleet. At 4 p.m., Vice Admiral Mitscher decided, despite the far distance of the Japanese fleet and the advanced hour of the afternoon, to launch an attack of around 180 planes, which took off a quarter of an hour later. By 6:15 p.m. the carrier Hiyō and two tankers were sunk. Hiyō was struck by two bombs, one of which detonated above the bridge and killed or wounded virtually everyone there, and sank two hours later. The carriers Zuikaku and Chiyoda were also damaged, and 40 aircraft were shot down. Ozawa then decided to retreat to Okinawa and Japan. As night fell, the return of American planes to their aircraft carriers took place in great confusion, resulting in significant losses.

Following the disastrous defeat of Ozawa's forces in the Philippines Sea, he submitted his resignation, which was refused.

=== Operation Shō-Gō and the defense of the Philippines ===
The Japanese defeat in the Philippine Sea made the loss of the Mariana Islands inevitable, which brought the heart of the Empire of Japan within range of the United States Army Air Forces' long-range B-29 Superfortress bombers. The loss of the Marianas precipitated the departure of General Tōjō as Prime Minister. He was replaced by General Koiso at the end of the Battle of Saipan. The Japanese military's main strategic concern was the defense of the territory which could be the next main American target. There were four likely targets: the Ryūkyū Islands, Formosa, the Kuril Islands and the Philippines. In the Shō-Gō Plan, the goal was to attack the surface forces tasked with the protection of Allied landings, to destroy them, then to attack the transport ships. The Palau Islands and the Western Carolinas were excluded from the defense perimeter and deemed inevitable losses.

As for the organization of Ozawa's forces, the loss of Hiyō and the poor performance of Ryūhō led to the withdrawal of the 2nd Carrier Division from front-line forces and the return of Zuikaku to the 3rd Carrier Division under the command of Vice-Admiral Ozawa.

Forces involved in the Shō-Gō Plan were divided into several parts. Vice-Admiral Kurita's "First Striking Force" returned to anchorage in the Lingga Islands in July, closer to Japan and fuel supplies. But Vice-Admiral Ozawa's "Main Body" force and Vice-Admiral Shima's "Second Striking Force" remained based in Japan to replenish carrier squadrons and train new pilots. The next major American offensive was presumed to begin in November 1943 at the earliest. However, things accelerated in mid-September and in early October, as the American bombardments left little doubt about the imminent American invasion of the Philippines. Vice-Admiral Ozawa then reported to Admiral Toyoda, Commander-in-Chief of the Combined Fleet, of the impossibility for the crews of his aircraft carriers being ready in time to provide air cover for Kurita's force. Ozawa proposed to have his and Kurita's forces operate autonomously. This was accepted by Toyoda. Vice-Admiral Ozawa was also ordered to transfer more than half of his pilots to Formosa; these pilots had not been trained to operate from aircraft carriers but could operate from land bases. Ozawa's aircraft carriers, with greatly depleted squadrons, were then assigned the role of decoy; they were to lure the fast American aircraft carriers away and allow Kurita's force of seven battleships and eleven heavy cruisers to reach the landing beaches more easily. Final adjustments were made to the plan after both Shima's and Ozawa's squadrons left their respective bases: the two hybrid carrier-battleships Ise and Hyūga (with no aircraft on board), were attached to Vice-Admiral Ozawa's squadron. Vice-Admiral Shima was ordered to operate in coordination with Vice-Admiral Kurita.

=== The Battle off Cape Engaño ===
Vice Admiral Ozawa's decoy "Northern Force", comprising one large aircraft carrier, his flagship the Zuikaku, three light aircraft carriers, two hybrid battleships, three light cruisers and ten destroyers, left the Japanese Inland Sea on October 20, 1944, around noon. By then the American landings had already begun on the island of Leyte (one of the main islands of the Philippines), and Vice-Admiral Kurita had already left the Lingga anchorage two days ago and reached Brunei in Borneo.

Vice-Admiral Ozawa was perfectly aware that his forces, with a total of a hundred aircraft (barely more aircraft than one American fleet carrier), was not in a position to confront Admiral Halsey's forces. However, he decided to do his best to draw them as far as possible from the San Bernardino Strait, where Vice-Admiral Kurita's "Center Force" was going to strike. He decided to break out into the Philippine Sea even if it meant the "complete destruction" of his fleet.

Vice-Admiral Ozawa led his ships to the north of Luzon, the northeastern point of which is Cape Engaño. At first, his force was not spotted by the American forces, although it had voluntarily broken off radio silence on October 23. On the morning of October 24, Ozawa found himself about a hundred nautical miles from Rear Admiral Sherman's Task Group 38.3 when the light aircraft carrier USS Princeton was crippled by an air attack by Japanese land-based aircraft. That morning he launched 76 planes to attack Task Group 38.3 without results. These pilots were ordered to then go and land on the airfields of Luzon, as the Japanese command was convinced that Ozawa's carriers would all be sunk.

Ozawa only learned of the result of the Battle of Sibuyan Sea through a message from Kurita at around 4.30 p.m., notifying Ozawa of his retreat. He concluded that he had failed in his mission and considered withdrawing. However, complying with Admiral Toyoda's order to have all forces attack "counting on divine assistance", he sailed south with the aircraft carriers in search of American forces, trying to draw the 3rd Fleet's attention to his decoy force. Ozawa dispatched the two hybrid battleships forward under the command of Rear Admiral Matsuda. It was then that American reconnaissance finally spotted his force, Admiral Halsey then decided to face what seemed to him as a new and powerful threat with the entire Task Force 38. He ordered his three Task Groups in the area to concentrate on attacking the Japanese aircraft carriers, and headed north.

During the night, warned that Vice-Admiral Kurita's Force had been spotted entering the San Bernardino Strait, Admiral Halsey did not worry. He was convinced that it was only a new manifestation of the Japanese obstinacy in carrying out orders "à la Guadalcanal". He was convinced that this force had been reduced and no longer represented a real threat, he concentrated his six fast battleships, three heavy cruisers and five large light cruisers on his front to attack the aircraft carriers of Ozawa. At daybreak on October 25, Vice-Admiral Ozawa headed north to attract the American forces further away from San Bernardino Strait.

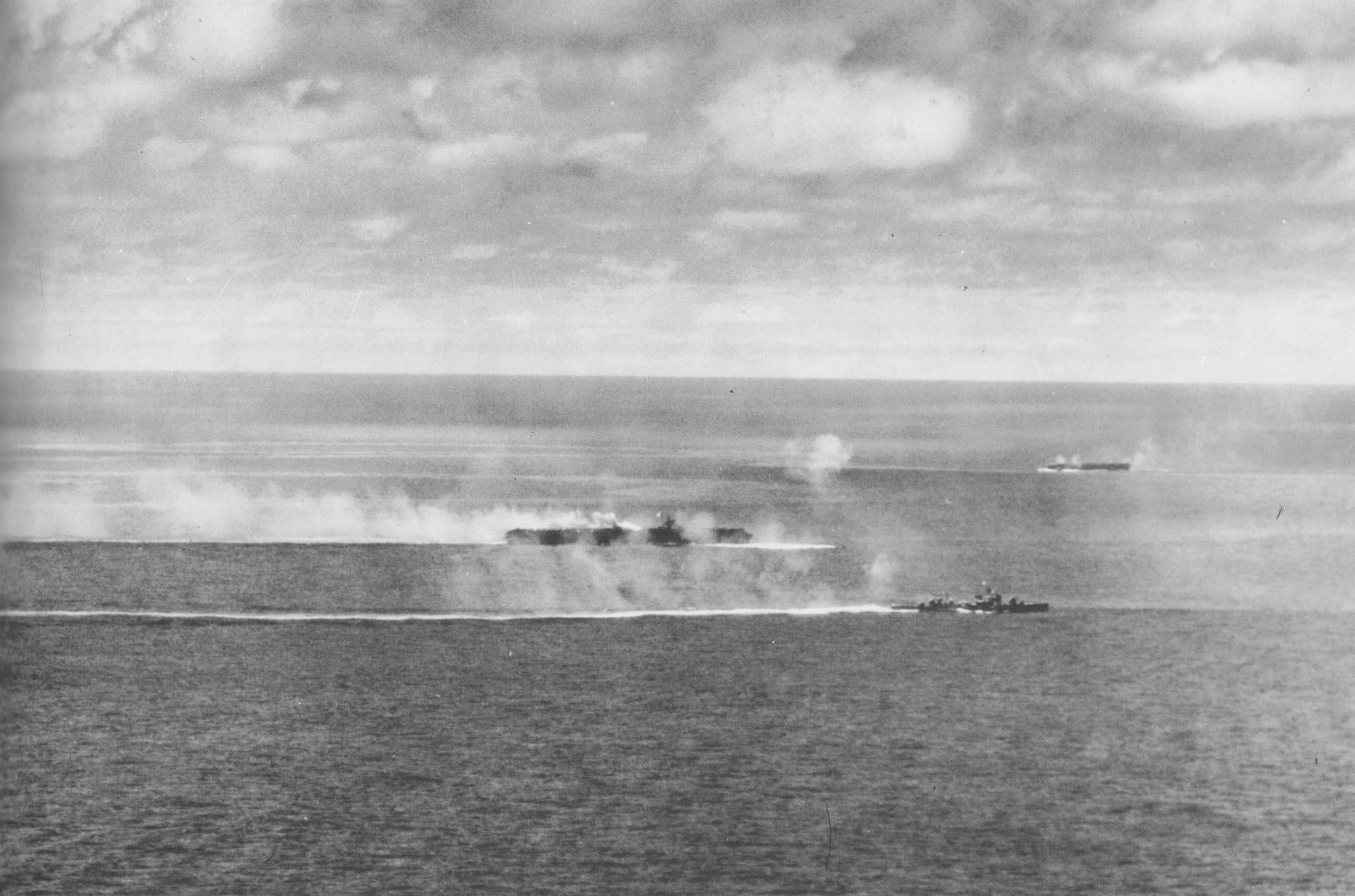
Zuikaku, previously flagship of Vice Admiral Ozawa, early in the afternoon of October 25, 1944, at the Battle off Cape Engaño

Taking off at 6:30 a.m., 180 aircraft of the first American wave had to wait in the air for an hour and a half for Ozawa's fleet to be precisely located. American intelligence officers estimated that they were north of the carriers of Task Force 38, between 45 and 85 nautical miles, but in reality they were northeast at 140 nautical miles. The attack did not take place until around 8:40 a.m. To the surprise of American airmen, the Japanese carriers had no aircraft on the flight decks, and virtually no fighter cover. However, the anti-aircraft fire was precise and intense, notably using Sanshikidan beehive rounds fired by the 14-inch main guns of battleships Ise and Hyūga. As a result of this air attack, the two Chitose-class aircraft carriers were disabled, and Chitose sank at about 09:30, Chiyoda was rendered immobile. Zuikaku, meanwhile, received damage that was not irreparable, but the damage inflicted on the flagship's transmission system did not allow Vice Admiral Ozawa to let either Vice Admiral Kurita or Admiral Toyoda know that the diversion was a success.

Task Force 38 had taken the bait and was in contact with the Japanese aircraft carriers, TF38 was north of Luzon, 200 nautical miles away from the San Bernardino Strait. At about 9:30 a.m., because of the damaged transmission systems on Zuikaku, Ozawa transferred his flag to the cruiser Ōyodo which had powerful radio systems designed to meet the needs of an admiral's staff commanding a fleet.

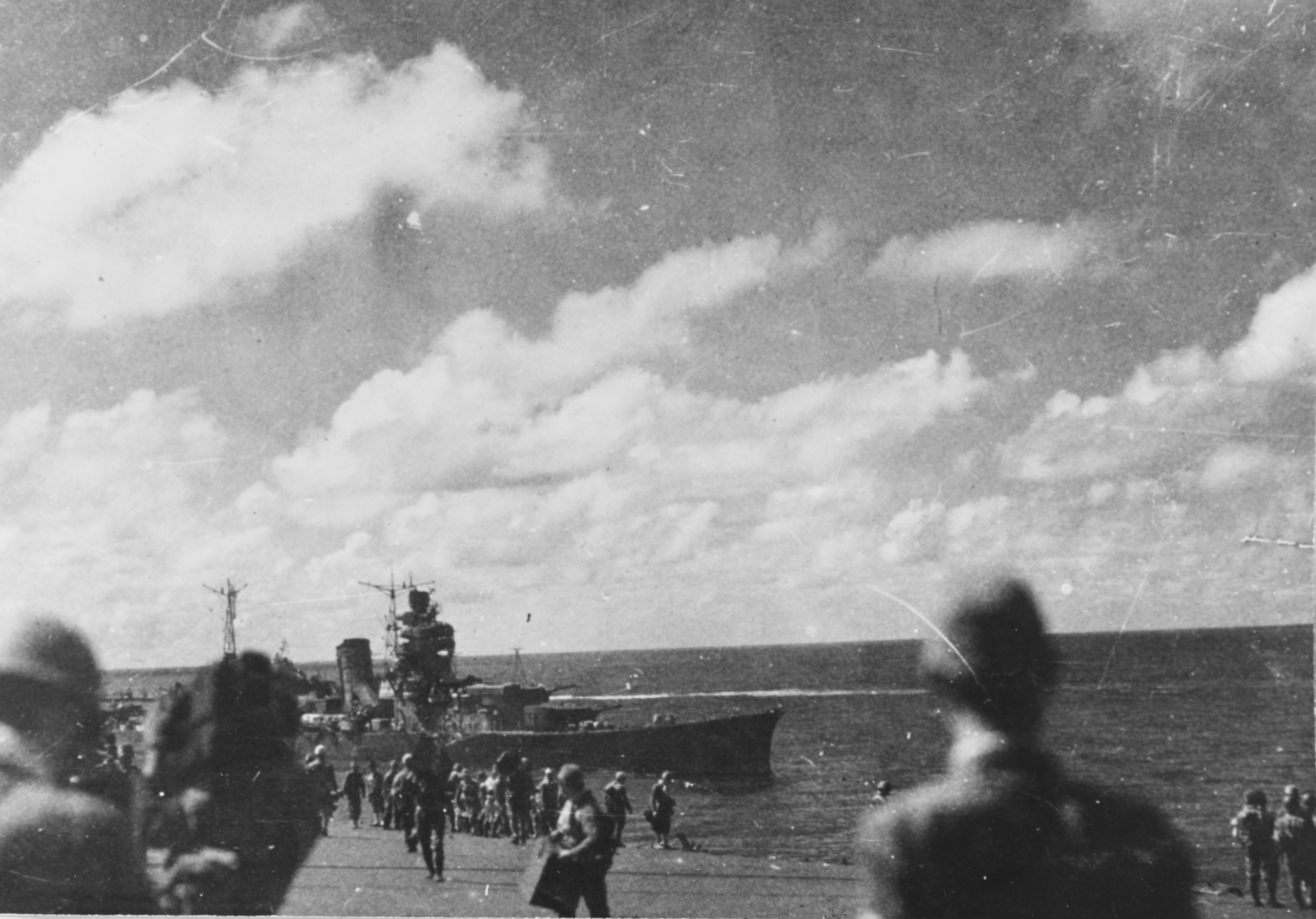
Ozawa transfers his flag from the damaged aircraft carrier Zuikaku to the light cruiser Ōyodo, at about 11:00 on 25 October

At about 08:30, when he had learned of the results of this first attack, Admiral Halsey ordered Vice Admiral "Ching" Lee, commanding the fast battleships, to proceed at 25 knots towards the damaged Japanese ships and finish them off with cannon fire. However, the commander of the 3rd Fleet began to receive very alarming messages from Vice-Admiral Kinkaid, commander of the 7th Fleet, about the combat off Samar between Vice-Admiral Kurita's large force of battleships, cruisers and destroyers and the heavily outgunned Task Unit of Taffy 3, which only consisted of escort carriers and destroyers. Still, Halsey continued to advance north, with his flagship, USS New Jersey, the modern battleships under Vice Admiral Lee and the large cruisers.

At about 10 a.m., shortly before Vice Admiral Mitscher launched a second attack, Admiral Halsey, who had already received five desperate calls from Vice Admiral Kinkaid, this time received an infamous message from Admiral Nimitz asking, from Pearl Harbor, "Where is Task Force 34? The world wonders" which he interpreted as a harsh and sarcastic rebuke. At 11:15 a.m., when the immobilized Japanese ships were only 40 nautical miles away, he ordered the fast battleships to turn south, in an attempt to intercept Kurita's force. Meanwhile, Vice-Admiral Ozawa continued heading north, with his less damaged ships.

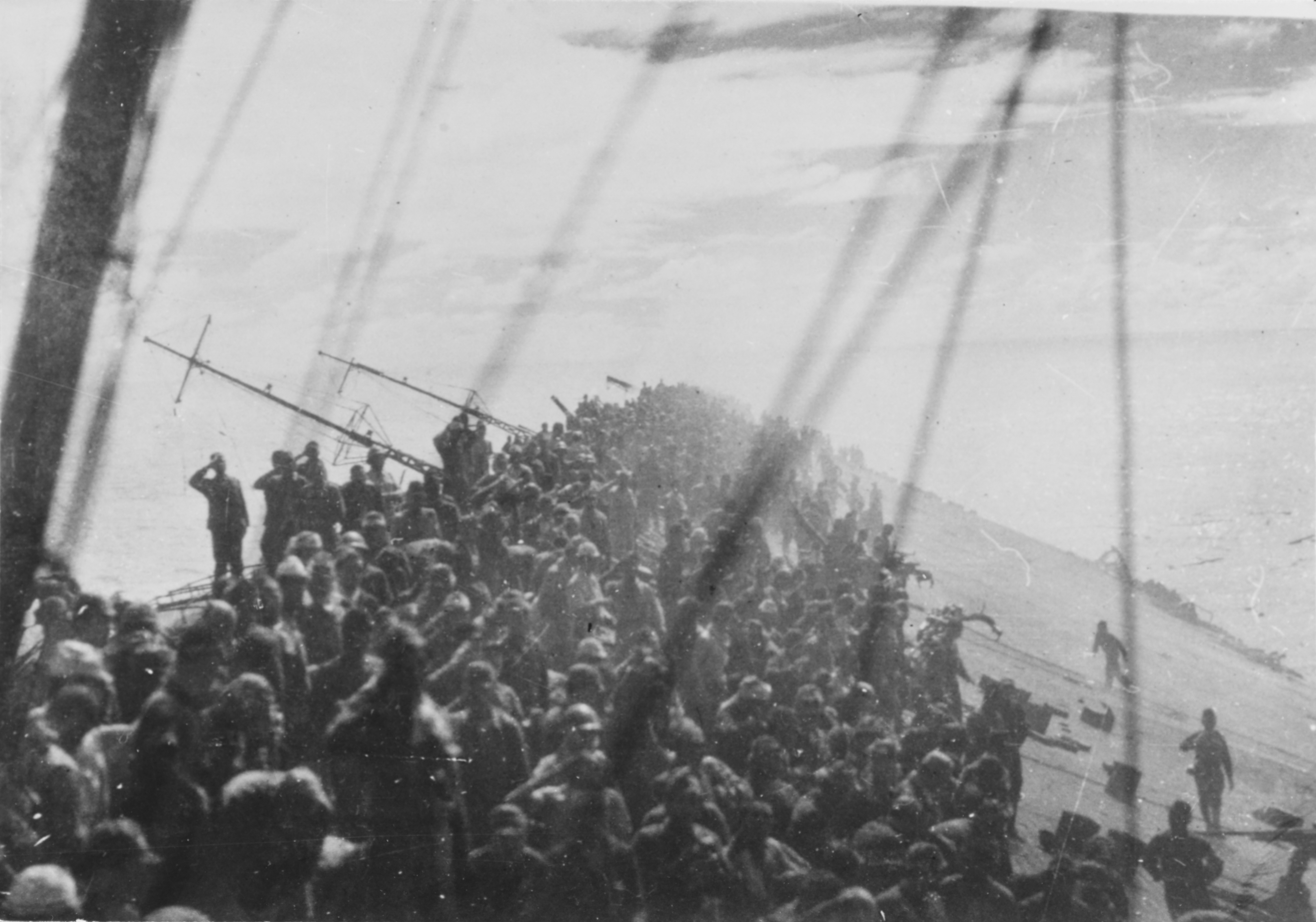
Zuikaku's crew salutes the flag before abandoning the sinking carrier on the afternoon of October 25

Admiral Halsey headed south with the fast battleships, three large light cruisers and Task Group 38.2. The mission to finish off Vice Admiral Ozawa fell to Vice Admiral Mitscher with the two Task Groups he had left behind. Mitscher launched two new attacks in the afternoon. The first, at around 1:30 p.m., fatally damaged Zuikaku, which was hit by half-ton armor-piercing bombs from twelve bombers from USS Lexington and nine "Helldivers" from USS Essex. The last Japanese aircraft carrier present at Pearl Harbor, Zuikaku, sank at around 14:30. Around 3 p.m., the previously damaged but maneuverable Zuihō was also sunk.

Chiyoda was the only carrier remaining, immobilized since the morning but still afloat. Halsey detached a task group of four cruisers and nine destroyers under Rear Admiral DuBose, these ships were a part of TG 38.3 and TG 38.4. Its mission was to pursue the remnants of Ozawa's force. However, Ozawa still had two battleships each armed with eight 14-inch (356 mm) guns, while Vice-Admiral Mitscher no longer had any battleships. Informed that there were no battleships around the Chiyoda, DuBose's detachment went to her. Chiyoda's crew had not abandoned ship and fought back with ineffective fire. The Japanese light aircraft carrier, in flames, sank around 4:30 p.m. A final air attack after 5 p.m. against Ise and Hyuga, inflicted only light damage. The American cruisers then attacked several small damaged Japanese ships. Around 7:30 p.m., learning of DuBose's relatively weak task group, Vice-Admiral Ozawa decided to turn around with his two battleships and meet the outgunned American forces. But as night fell, with his destroyers beginning to run low on fuel oil, Rear Admiral DuBose turned back at about 9:50 p.m. Meeting no one, Ozawa turned back north, towards Japan. The Battle of Leyte Gulf had ended.

It was reported that Ozawa contemplated suicide after the defeat, but was dissuaded by a fellow officer, who argued that Ozawa was the only one of the Japanese admirals at the Battle of Leyte Gulf who successfully carried out an assigned mission.

=== Operation Cherry Blossoms at Night ===
On November 15, 1944, the Mobile Fleet and the 3rd Fleet were disbanded. Vice Admiral Ozawa was appointed vice chief of the General Staff of the Navy and director of the Naval War College. Ozawa led the planning of Operation PX, also known as Operation Cherry Blossoms at Night, a planned Japanese military attack on American civilians using biological weapons.

Operation PX was proposed in December 1944. The name for the operation came from the Japanese use of the code name PX for Pestis bacillus (bubonic plague) infected fleas. In planning the operation, the navy partnered with Lieutenant-General Shirō Ishii of Unit 731, who had extensive experience on weaponizing pathogenic bacteria and human vulnerability to biological and chemical warfare.

The plan for the attack involved Seiran aircraft launched by I-400-class submarine aircraft carriers upon the West Coast of the United States—specifically, the cities of San Diego, Los Angeles, and San Francisco. The planes would spread weaponized bubonic plague, cholera, typhus, dengue fever, and other pathogens in a biological terror attack upon the population. The submarine crews would infect themselves and run ashore in a suicide mission. Planning for Operation PX was finalized on March 26, 1945, but shelved shortly thereafter due to strong opposition from Army Chief of General Staff Yoshijirō Umezu.

=== Okinawa and the end of the war ===
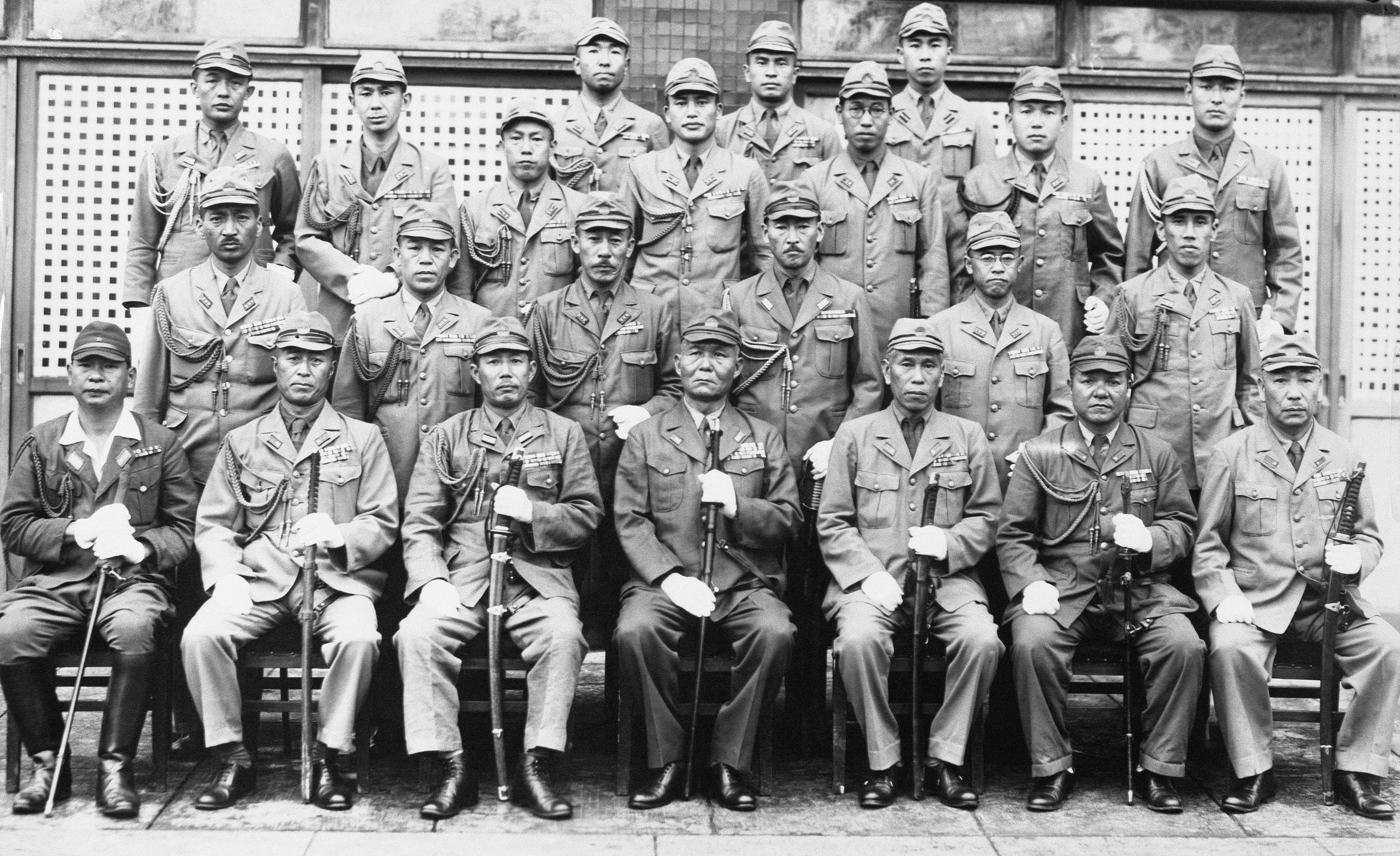
Ozawa (front row, center), with the staff of the Combined Fleet, August 1945

In February 1945, with the formation of the 5th Air Fleet, under Vice Admiral Matome Ugaki, navy high command began to supervise kamikaze operations. Until then, kamikaze attacks were mostly organized by local commanders.

In March, when briefing Emperor Hirohito on Japan's response to the expected invasion of Okinawa, Japanese military leaders explained that the Imperial Japanese Army was planning extensive air attacks, including the use of kamikaze tactics. The emperor then reportedly asked, "But what about the Navy? What are they doing to assist in defending Okinawa? Have we no more ships?" Feeling pressured by the emperor to mount some kind of attack, Japanese Navy high command conceived a kamikaze-type mission for their remaining operational large ships. Ozawa was involved in the planning of Operation Ten-Go, code name of the suicide attack of battleship Yamato, cruiser Yahagi and eight other warships against Allied forces engaged at Okinawa.

On May 29, 1945, when Admiral Toyoda succeeded Admiral Oikawa as Chief of the General Staff of the Imperial Japanese Navy, Vice Admiral Ozawa succeeded him as the last Commander-in-Chief of the Combined Fleet. Upon his appointment, he refused a promotion to admiral and remained as a vice admiral until the final disbandment of the Imperial Japanese Navy. He was the only wartime commander of the Combined Fleet who did not become an admiral.

As commander of the Combined Fleet, he continued Operation Kikusui, a series of kamikaze attacks launched against Allied naval forces around Okinawa. Kikusui managed to inflict serious damage to the Allies but it ended following the defeat of Japanese land forces on Okinawa, as Ozawa's remaining forces prepared for the final showdown on the Japanese home islands. In the face of devastating B-29 air raids on Japan, on June 24 Ozawa ordered Vice Admiral Kinpei Teraoka, commander of the 3rd Air Fleet, to begin preparations for Operation Tsurugi. The operation was a suicide attack in which Yokosuka P1Ys would strafe and bomb American airfields in the Mariana Islands, afterwards, Mitsubishi G4Ms carrying Giretsu Kuteitai commandos would crash land on them. The commandos would then destroy as many B-29 bombers as possible before fighting to the death. This attack was scheduled to take place between August 19 and 23. However, Japan surrendered on August 15.

On 25 June 1945, Ozawa issued orders for an attack on American ships anchored at Ulithi, dubbed Operation Arashi. The orders called for submarines I-13 and I-14 to transport Nakajima C6N1 Saiun reconnaissance aircraft to Truk in the Caroline Islands in late July 1945. In Operation Hikari, the C6N aircraft were to conduct a reconnaissance of Ulithi, noting the presence and location of Allied aircraft carriers and troop transports. Submarine carriers I-400 and I-401 then were to launch a combined total of six M6A1 floatplanes — which were to use the reconnaissance information to assist them in targeting Allied ships — on 17 August 1945 for a nighttime strike under a full moon against the Ulithi anchorage, each plane armed with an 800-kilogram (1,764 lb) bomb. Ozawa also authorized Operation Tan No. 4, a surprise kamikaze attack on Ulithi, following Operation Tan No. 2 on March 11 (No. 3 was cancelled due to weather). None of these attacks on Ulithi materialized because of Japan's surrender.

Just before the surrender of Japan, Vice Admiral Ōnishi, who is known as the father of the kamikaze, vocally advocated for continuing the war. Ōnishi claimed that the sacrifice of 20 million more Japanese lives would make Japan victorious, Ozawa reportedly rebuked Ōnishi by asking him who would rebuild Japan if 20 million more men had died.

On 15 August, hours after Hirohito announced the surrender of Japan, Vice Admiral Ugaki personally joined a kamikaze attack. Ozawa criticized Ugaki's suicide, claiming that this was a violation of orders. He then forbade his staff from committing suicide. That same day, the commander of Atsugi Air Base Yasuna Kozono publicly announced that his unit would not surrender. Ozawa perceived this as a mutiny and prepared to suppress it. However, the situation came to an end when Kozono fell ill with malaria.

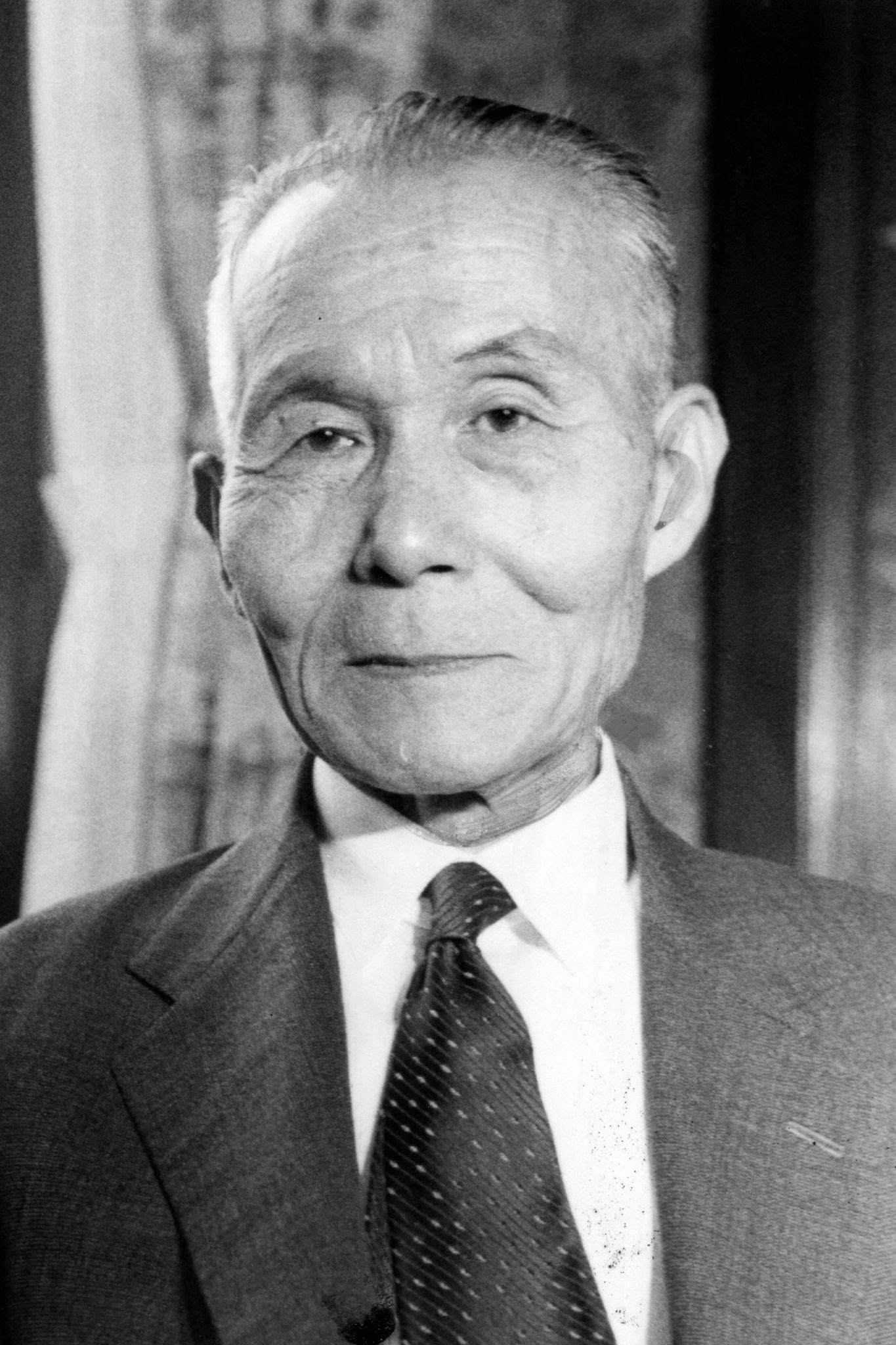
Ozawa as a Defense Agency advisor, 1955

According to American officers who interviewed him after the war, Ozawa made a favorable impression. Although he was elderly and infirm by then, he was composed, had a sharp mind and was well informed. It was from post-war interrogations with Ozawa that historians learned of important changes to the Shō-Gō Plan that took place at the eve of the Battle for Leyte Gulf. He also had the reputation of being both courageous and compassionate towards his men.

Ozawa avoided prosecution by SCAP authorities and served as an advisor for the Japanese Defense Agency. He died in 1966 at the age of 80.

== Bibliography ==
- Ireland, Bernard (2004). Cuirassés du 20e siècle [20th Century Battleships]. Airelles référence (in French). St-Sulpice: Airelles. ISBN 978-2-88468-038-7.
- Lenton, H.T. (1968). American battleships, carriers and cruisers. Navies of the Second World War. Macdonald & Co (Publishers) Ltd. ISBN 0-356-01511-4.
- Macintyre, Donald (1975). Famous fighting ships. Hamlyn. ISBN 978-0-600-35486-4.
- Masson, Philippe (1983). Histoire des batailles navales : de la voile aux missiles [History of Naval Battles: From Sail to Missiles] (in French). Paris: Éditions Atlas. ISBN 2-7312-0136-3.
- Preston, Antony (1980). Histoire des Porte-Avions [History of Aircraft Carriers] (in French). Translated from English. Paris: Fernand Nathan Editeurs. ISBN 2-09-292040-5.
- Shuppan Kyodo-sha (1968a). Japanese battleships and cruisers. Navies of the Second World War. Macdonald & Co Publishers Ltd. ISBN 0-356-01475-4.
- Shuppan Kyodo-sha (1968b). Japanese aircraft carriers and destroyers. Navies of the Second World War. Macdonald & Co Publishers Ltd. ISBN 0-356-01475-4.
- Warner, Oliver; Bennett, Geoffrey; Macyntire, Donald G.F.W.; Uehling, Franck; Wettern, Desmond; Preston, Antony; Mordal, Jacques (1976). Histoire de la guerre sur mer: des premiers cuirassés aux sous-marins nucléaires. Encyclopédie visuelle Elsevier (in French). Translated from English. Paris Bruxelles: Elsevier Séquoia. ISBN 978-2-8003-0148-8.
- Watts, Anthony (1971). Japanese Warships of World War II. Ian Allen Ltd. ISBN 0-7110-0215-0.
- Woodward, C. Vann (1947). The battle for Leyte Gulf. Ballantine Books.
- Garrett, Benjamin C. (2007). Historical Dictionary of Nuclear, Biological, and Chemical Warfare. Scarecrow Press. ISBN 9780810864375.
- Geoghegan, John (2014). Operation Storm:Japan's Top Secret Submarines and Its Plan to Change the Course of World War II. Crown. ISBN 9780770435738.
- Gold, Hal (2004). Unit 731 Testimony: Japan's Wartime Human Experimentation Program. Tuttle Publishing. ISBN 9780804835657.
- Feifer, George (2001). The Battle of Okinawa: the blood and the bomb (1st ed.). Guilford, CT: Lyons Press. ISBN 978-1-58574-215-8.
- Felton, Mark (2012). The Devil's Doctors: Japanese Human Experiments on Allied Prisoners of War. Pen and Sword. ISBN 9781783032624.
- 防衛庁防衛研修所戦史室 (Japan Ministry of Defense) (1969). 戦史叢書24 比島・マレー方面海軍進攻作戦 (in Japanese). 朝雲新聞社 (Asagumo).
- 防衛庁防衛研修所戦史室 (Japan Ministry of Defense) (1976). 戦史叢書93大本営海軍部・聯合艦隊(7)戦争最終期 (in Japanese). 朝雲新聞社 (Asagumo).
- 防衛庁防衛研修所戦史室 (Japan Ministry of Defense) (1968). 戦史叢書17沖縄方面海軍作戦 (in Japanese). 朝雲新聞社 (Asagumo).
- Tagaya, Osamu (2001). Mitsubishi Type 1 Rikko 'Betty' Units of World War 2. Osprey Publishing. ISBN 978-1-84176-082-7.
- 惠, 隆之介 (2006). 敵兵を救助せよ!―英国兵422名を救助した駆逐艦「雷」工藤艦長 (in Japanese). 草思社. ISBN 978-4794214997.
- Cleaver, Thomas McKelvey (2017). Pacific Thunder: The US Navy's Central Pacific Campaign, August 1943-October 1944. Bloomsbury Publishing. ISBN 978-1472821881.

== Citations ==
Military offices
Preceded by Iwashita Yasutarō	Combined Fleet & 1st Fleet; Chief-of-staff; 18 February 1937 - 15 November 1937	Succeeded by Takahashi Ibō
Preceded by Acting Headmaster; Abe Kasuke; Headmaster; Nagumo Chūichi	Naval War College; Headmaster; 6 September 1941 - 18 October 1941	Succeeded by Itō Seiichi
Preceded by Itō Seiichi	Naval War College; Headmaster; 18 November 1944 - 19 May 1945	Post Abolished
Preceded by Toyoda Soemu	Combined Fleet; Commander-in-chief; 29 May 1945 - 10 October 1945	Fleet Dissolved
