= Akita Port Tower Selion =

Tower building in Akita, Akita prefecture, Japan

Akita City Port Tower
- 秋田市ポートタワー

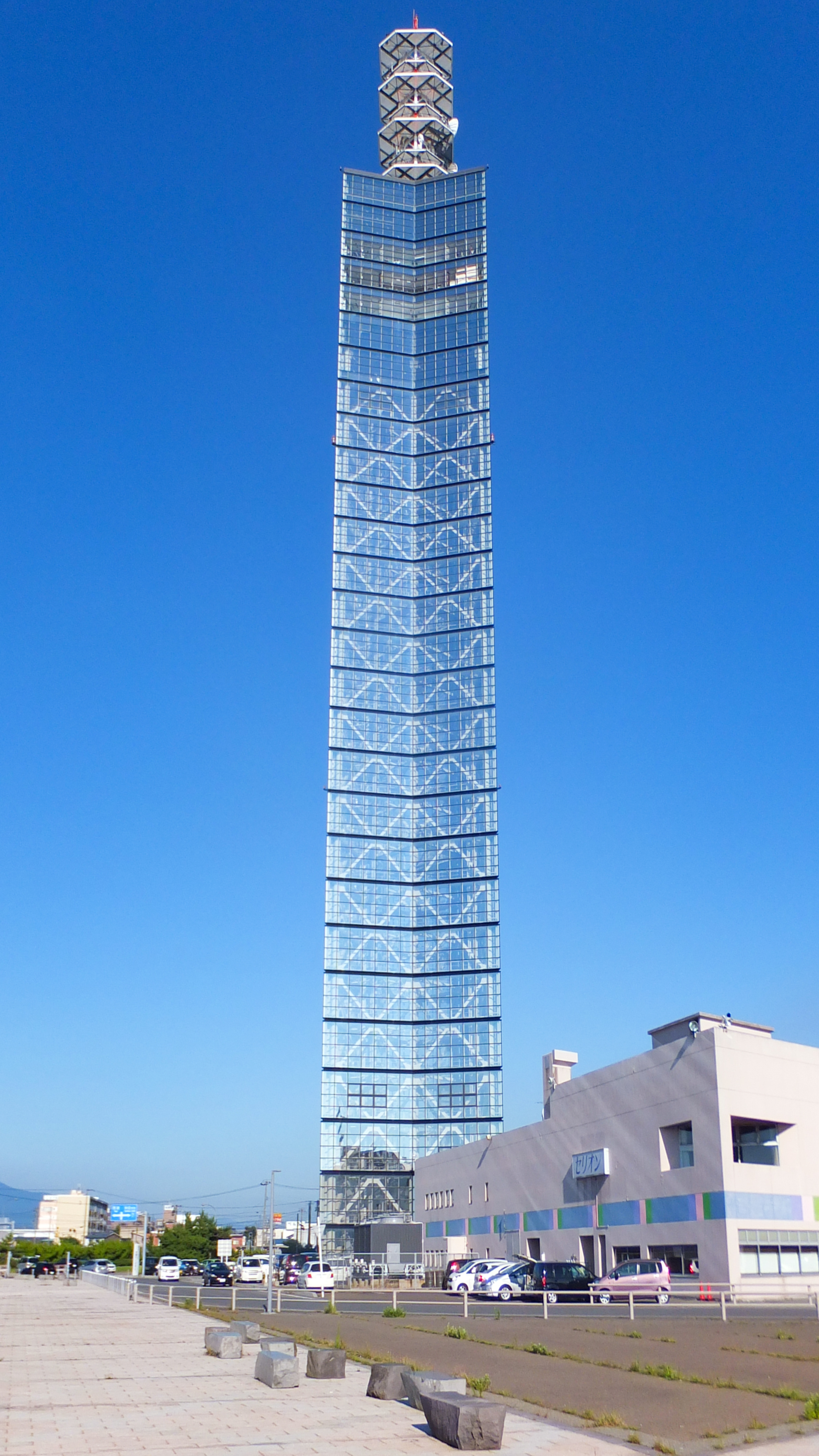
- Akita Port Tower Selion
- Interactive map of the Akita City Port Tower area

General information
- Status: Completed
- Architectural style: Steel frame
- Location: Akita, Japan
- Coordinates: 39°45′9.8″N 140°3′39.6″E
- Opening: 8 April 1994
- Cost: JPY 1.43 billion
- Owner: City of Akita

Height
- Architectural: 143.6 m (471 ft)
- Observatory: 100m

Technical details
- Floor count: 5
- Floor area: 4,747m²

Design and construction
- Main contractor: Obayashi Corporation; TOA Construction Corporation

Japanese name
- Kanji: 秋田市ポートタワー
- Hiragana: あきたしぽーとたわー
Transcriptions
- Romanization: Akitashi Pōto Tawā

Roadside Station Akita Minato
Roadside Station Akita Minato
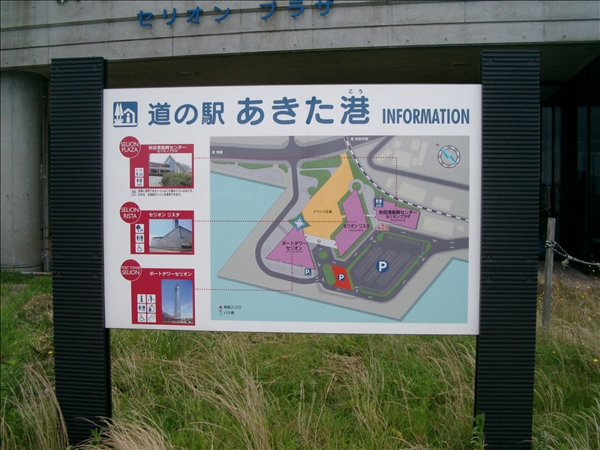

Roadside Station Information
- Road: Japan National Route 7
- Registered number: 05028
- Opened: 31 July, 2010
- Parking: 199 spaces
- Toilets: 29

Address
- 9-1, Nishi1-chome. Tsuchizakiminato, Akita City

The Akita City Port Tower Selion (秋田市ポートタワーセリオン, Akitashi Pōto Tawā Serion) is one of the landmarks in the city of Akita, Japan. The sightseeing tower with 6,272 tempered glasses was completed in 1994. It is located in the Tsuchizaki District, Akita, Akita Prefecture, Japan. The steel tower is the tallest structure in the 3 northern Tohoku prefectures with its observation deck at 100 metres (328 ft) and its spire at 143.6 metres (471 ft). The viewing platform provides a 360-degree panorama of the city and the mountains of Oga Peninsula, Taiheizan, and Mt. Chokai are visible. Cable Networks Akita received the TV-U Yamagata broadcast from Takadateyama, Tsuruoka at this landmark in the past.

== Events ==
- Cue sports at the 2001 World Games

== Gallery ==
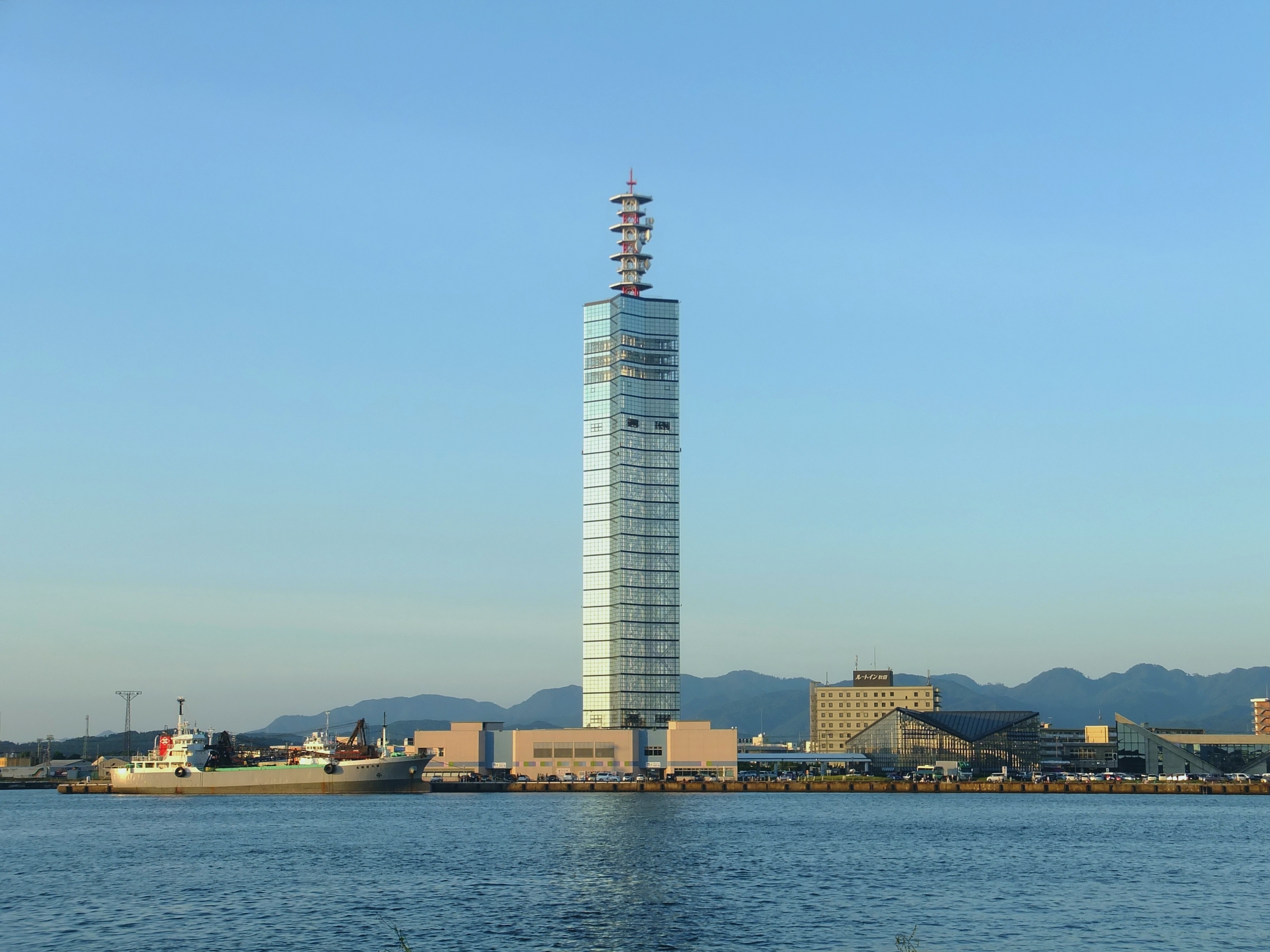

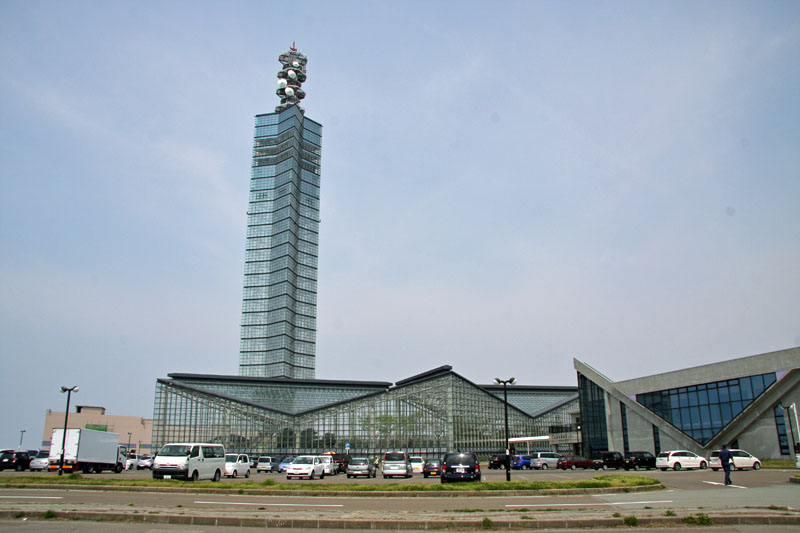

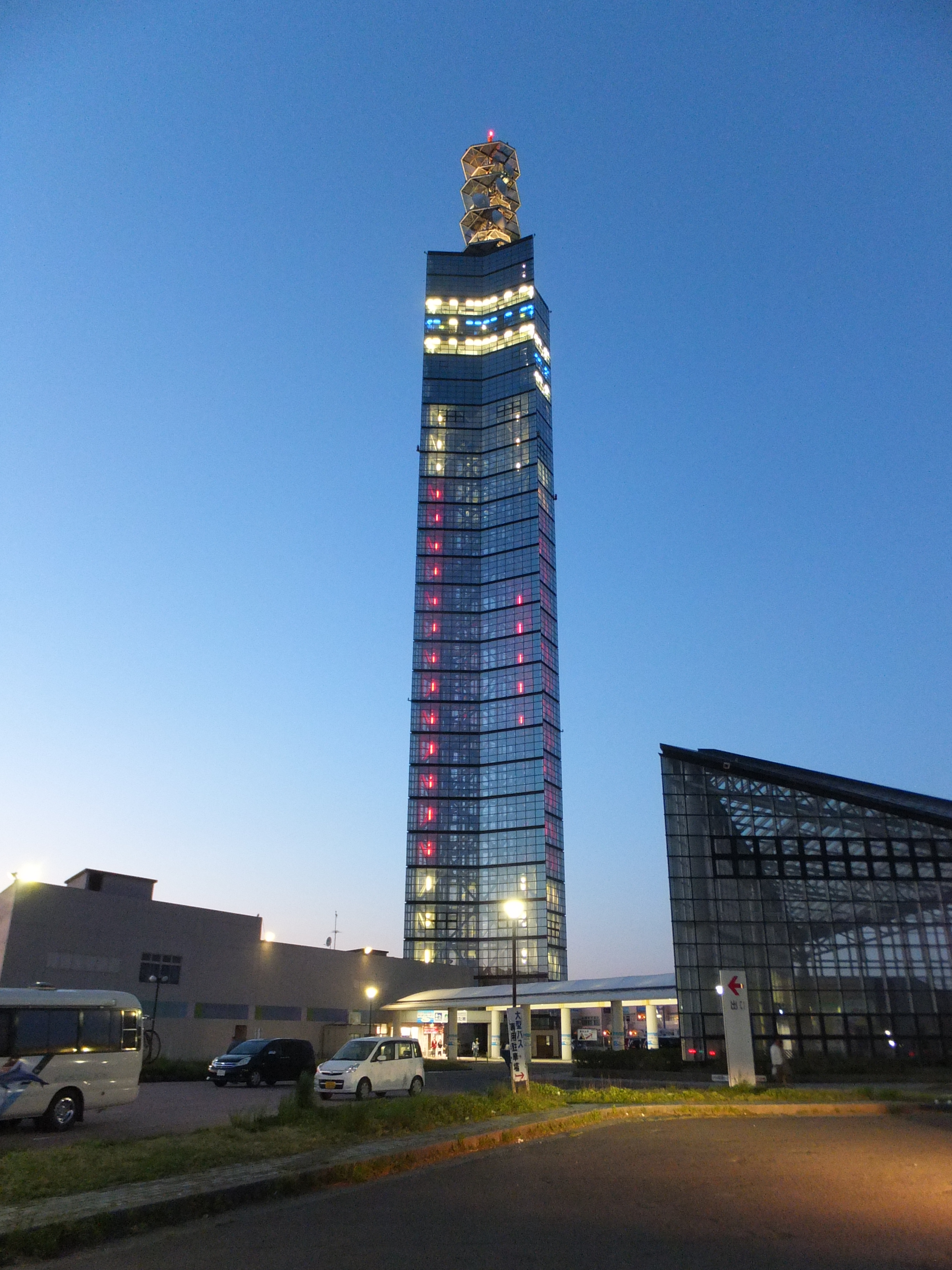

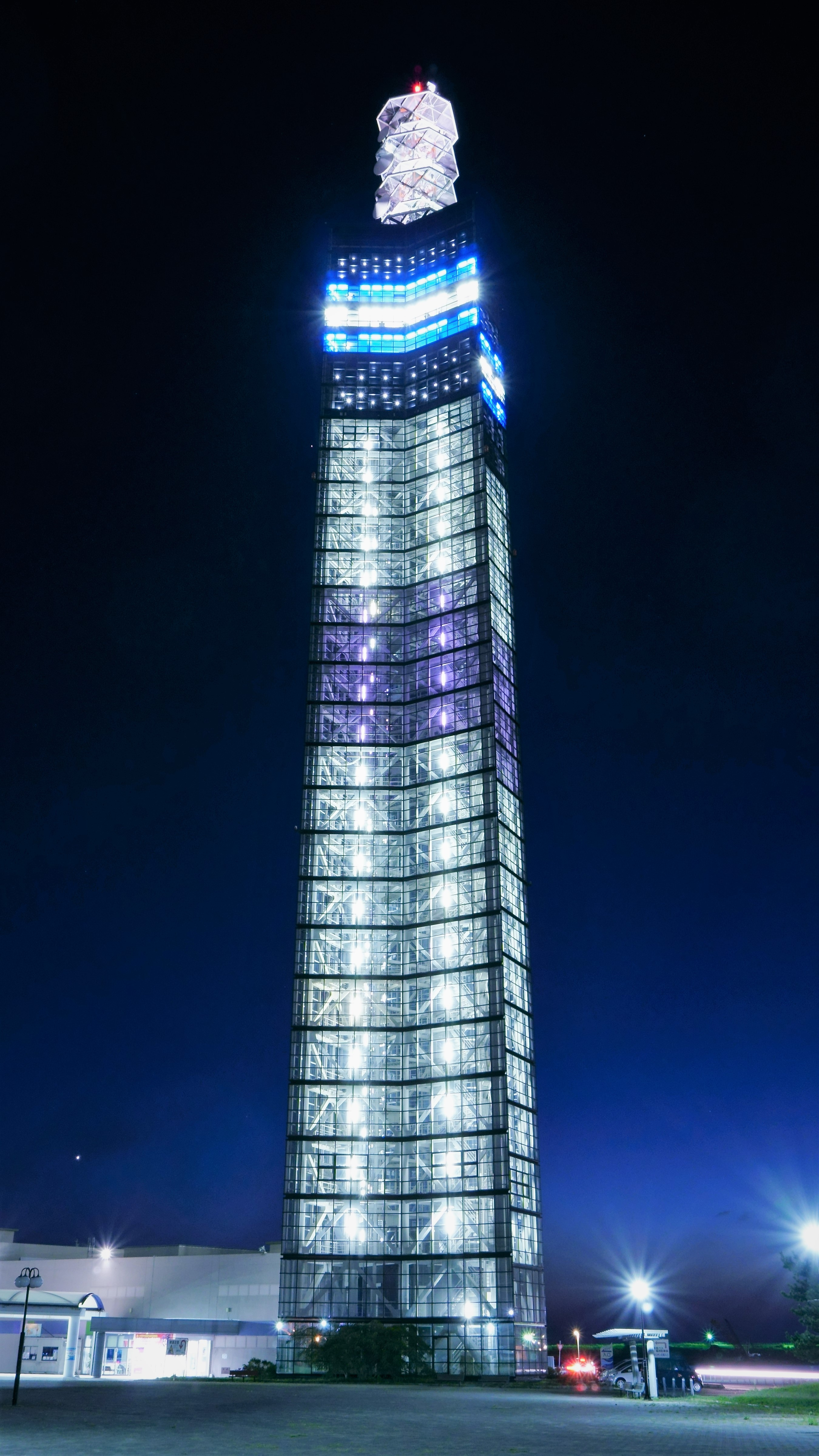

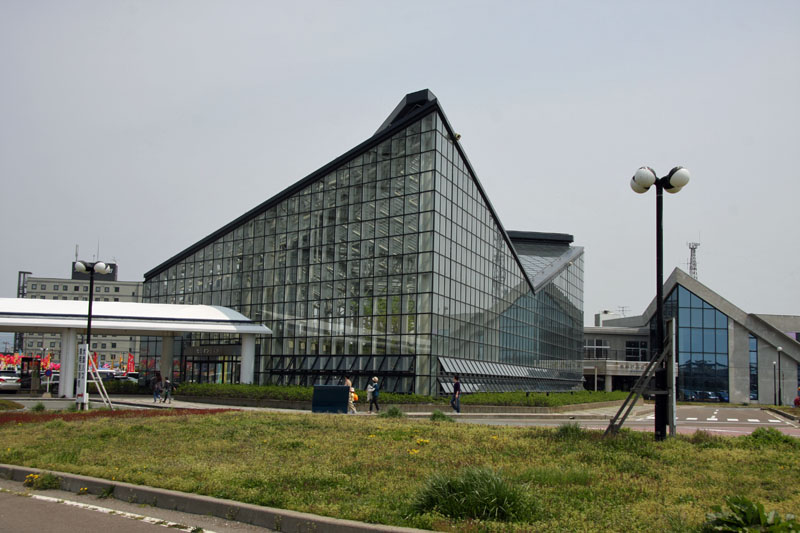
Selion Rista

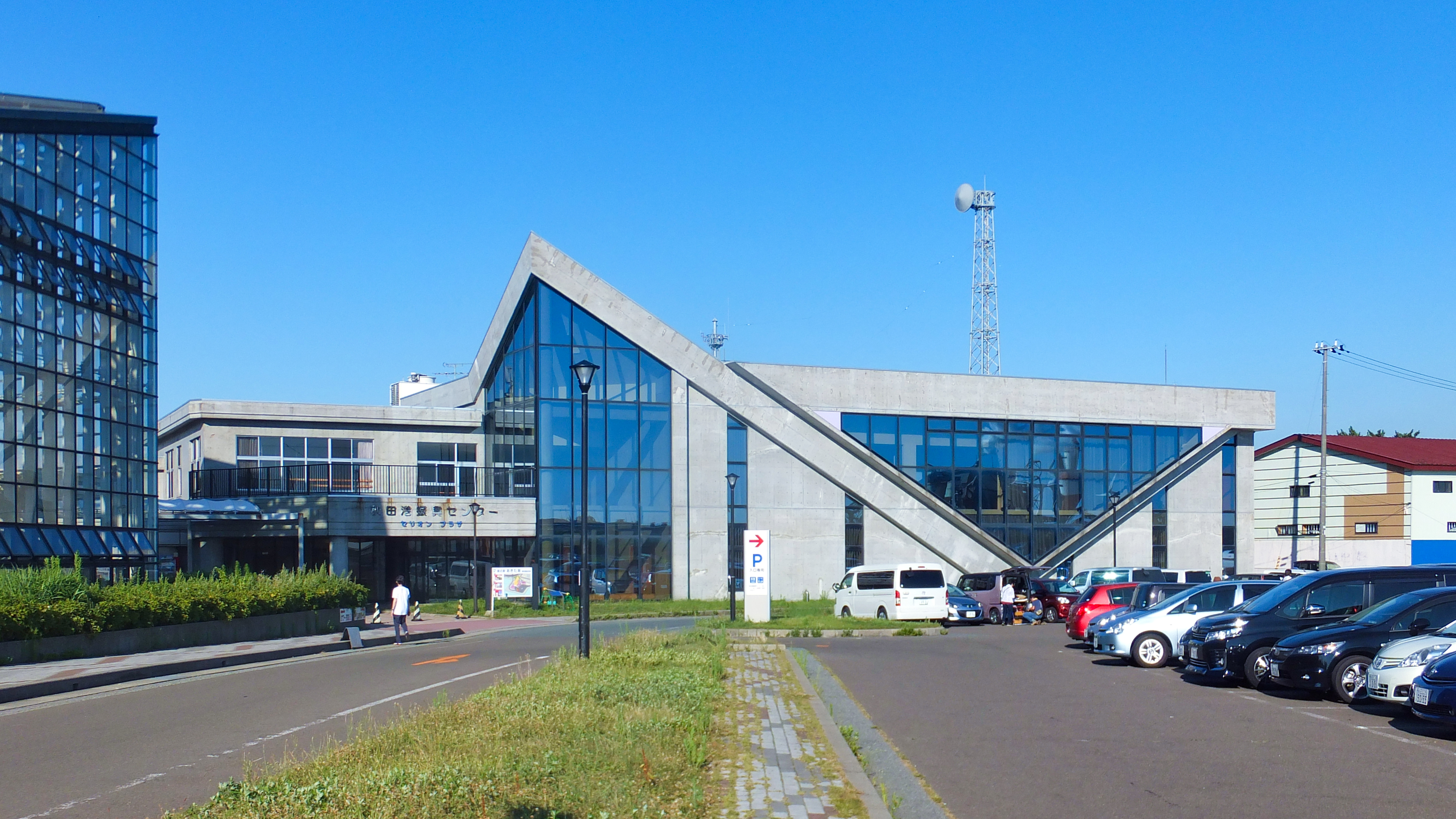
Selion Plaza

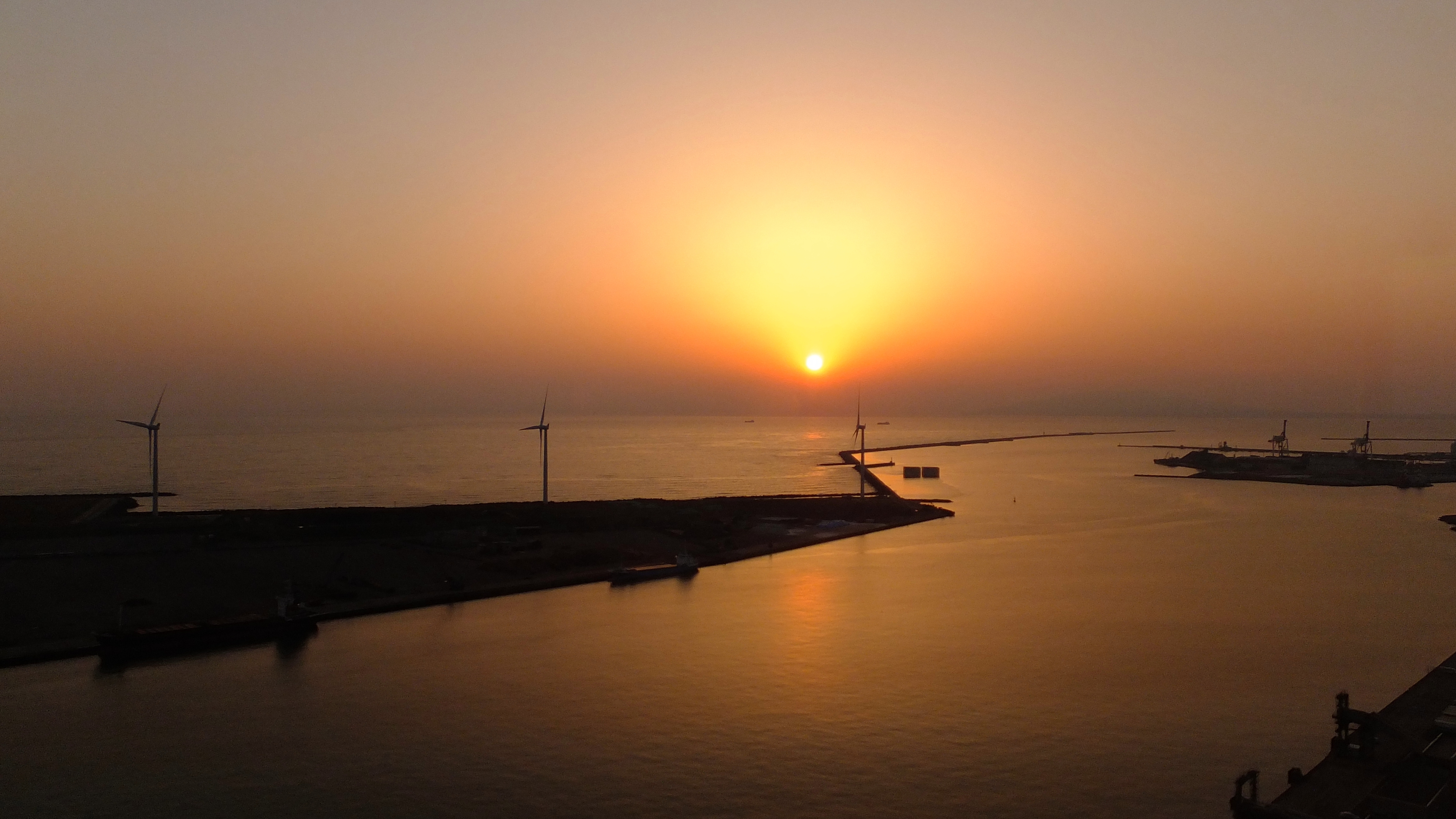

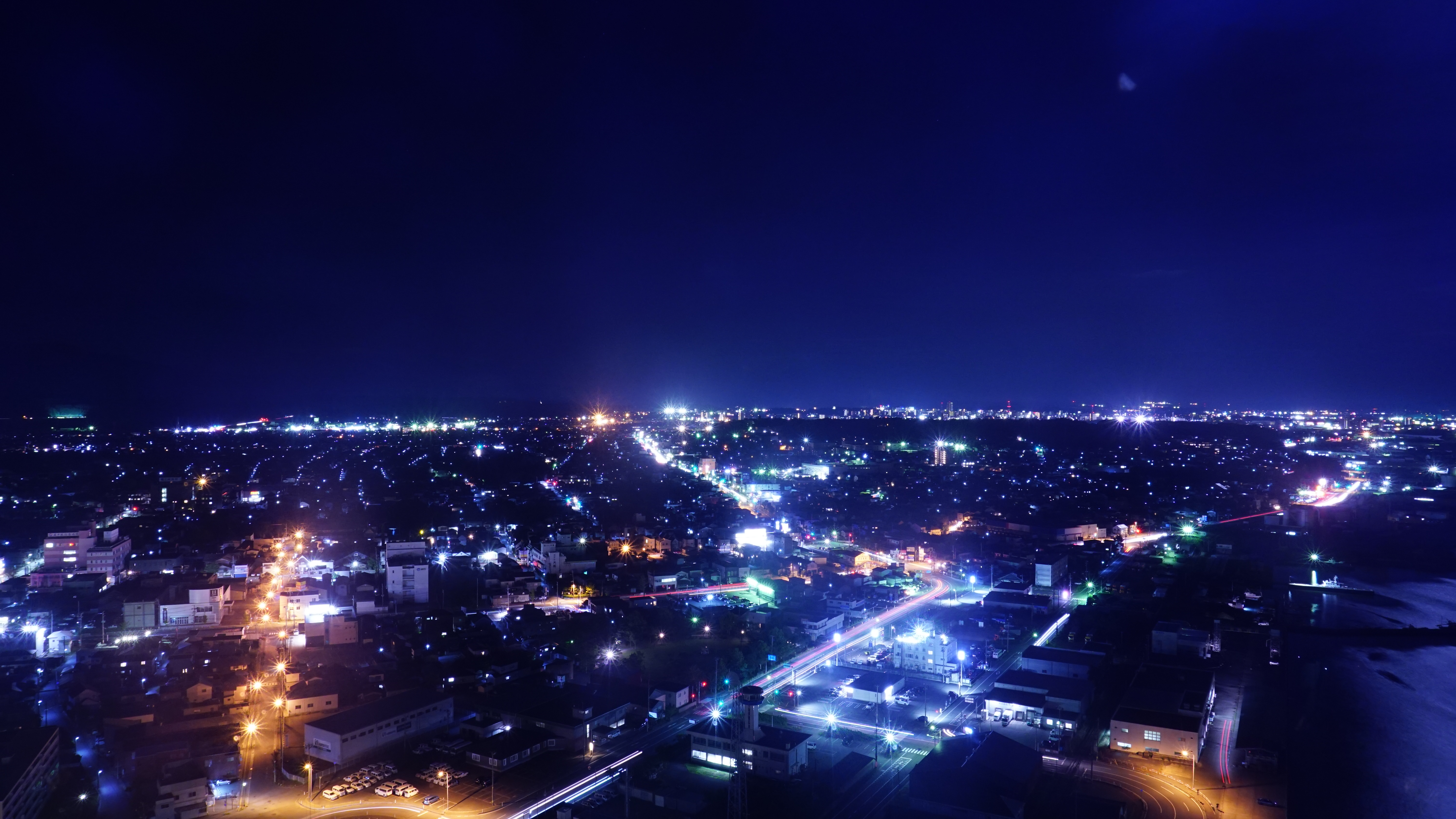

== See also ==
- Port of Akita
- List_of_tallest_towers#Towers between 150 and 200 metres tall
