= Tsuchizaki Minato, Akita =

Tsuchizaki-Minato 土崎港
- Neighborhood of Akita City
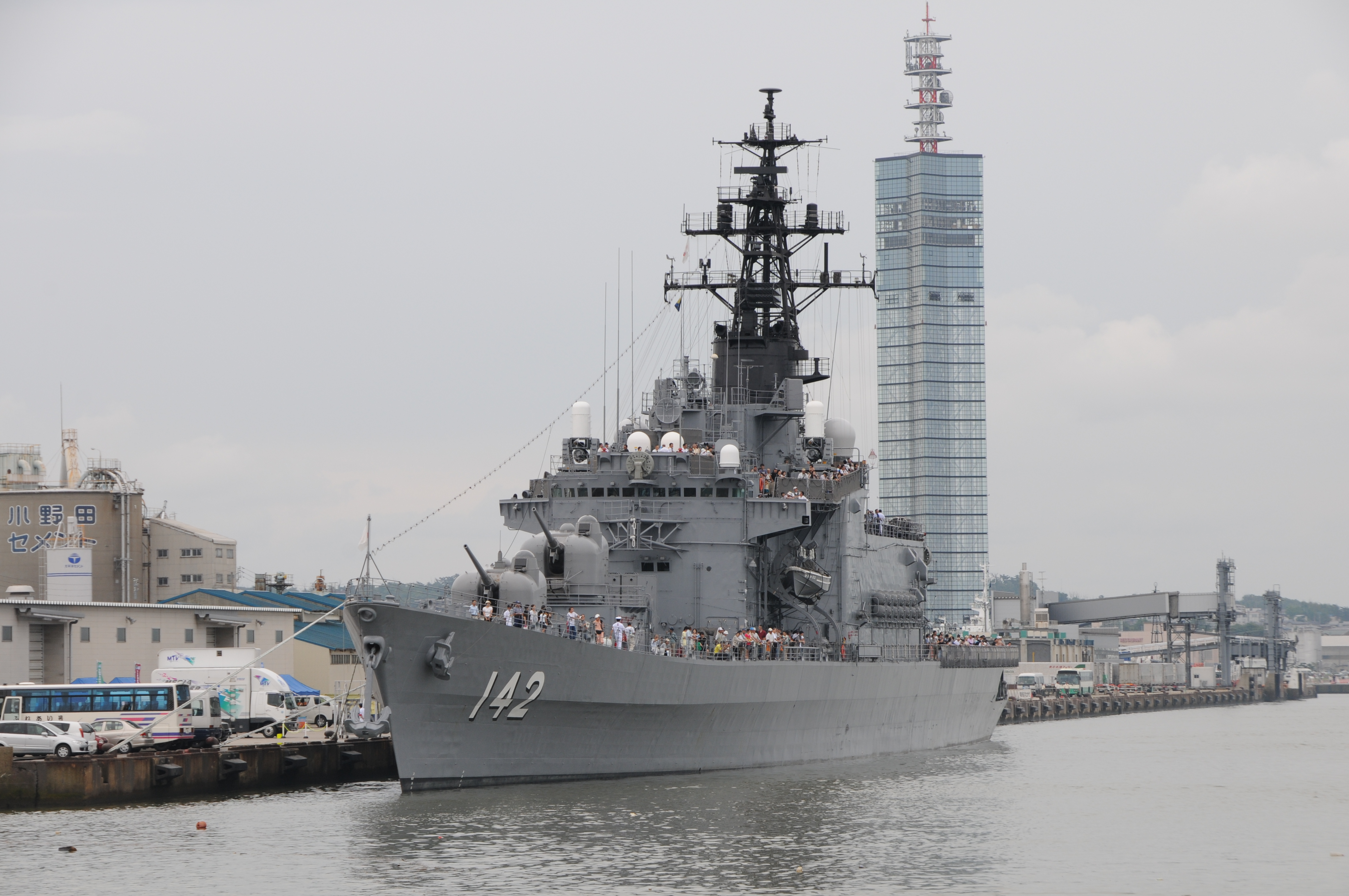

- Location within Akita Prefecture Location within Japan
- Coordinates: 39°45′38.6″N 140°3′56.4″E
- Country: Japan
- Prefecture: Akita Prefecture
- City: Akita

Area
  - Total: 6.29 km^{2} (2.43 sq mi)

Population (1 October 2009)
  - Total: 21,310
  - Density: 3,390/km^{2} (8,770/sq mi)
- Time zone: UTC+9 (Japan Standard Time)
- Yubin Bango: 011-0046 etc
- Area code: 018
- Vehicle registration: Akita

Tsuchizaki-Minato (土崎港, Tsuchizaki-Minato) is a neighbourhood located in Akita City, Akita Prefecture, Japan. As of 1 October 2009, the neighbourhood had an estimated population of 21,310 and a population density of 3,400 persons per km^{2}. The total area of the neighbourhood is 6.29 square kilometres (2.43 sq mi). Annexed by the city in 1941, it borders the neighborhoods of Shogunno on the east, Iijima on the north, Mukaihama on the west and Terauchi on the south. The Tsuchizaki area is a port town that developed at the mouth of the Omono River and a place of Port of Akita and Japan Railway Tsuchizaki factory. Tsuchizaki Float Festival is a celebration in the neighbourhood, held every year from July 20 to 21. The Tsuchizaki air raid burned the port facilities and killed more than 250 people on August 14 and 15, 1945.

== Schools ==
- Tsuchizaki Elementary School
- Tsuchizaki Minami Elementary School
- Kohoku Elementary School
- Tsuchizaki Junior High School
- Akita Chuo High School

== Surrounding area ==
- Port of Akita Nakajima Pier
  - Nakajima Pier Ferry Terminal
  - Roadside Station Akita port Akita Port Tower Selion (Akita City Port Tower)
- Akita City Northern Citizen Service Center
- Tsuchizaki Minato History Tradition Hall
- Akita Rinko Police Station
- Akita Maritime Japan Coast Guard

== Notable people ==
- Akita Sanesue, daimyo
- Dewaminato Rikichi, sumo wrestler
- Yukiko Ebata, volleyball player
- Kenzo Futaki, doctor
- Ōmi Komaki, scholar and translator
- Miya Sato (volleyball player, born 1990)

== See also ==
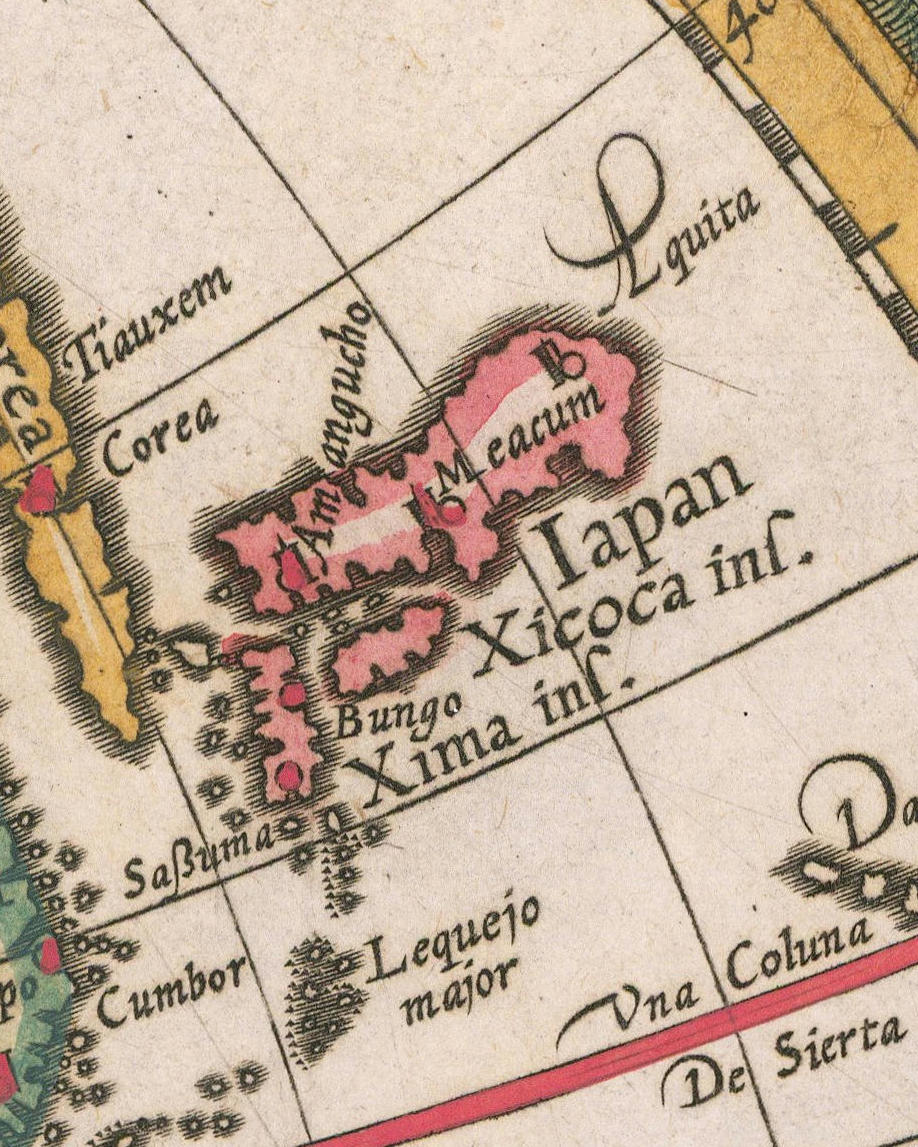
In this 1596 Word map, Port of Akita is described as "Aquita"

- Port Tower Selion
- Tsuchizaki Station
- Minato Castle
- Pizza-La
