= Bombing of Akita in World War II =

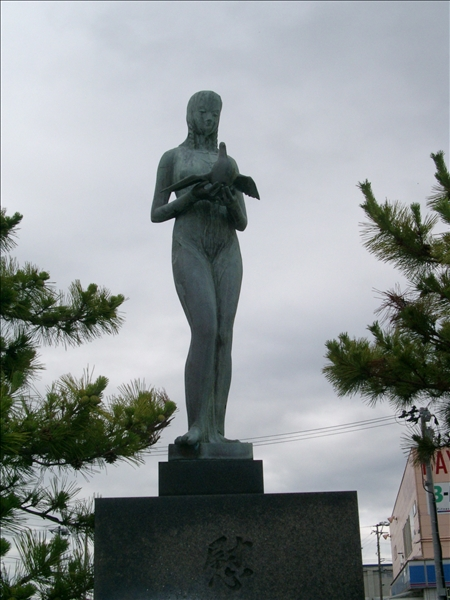
Tsuchizaki air raid memorial

The bombing of Akita (秋田空襲, Akita-kūshū), also known as the Tsuchizaki Air Raid (土崎大空襲, Tsuchizaki-Dai-kūshū), on the night of August 14, 1945, was part of the strategic bombing air raids on Japan campaign waged by the United States against military and civilian targets and population centers during the Japan home islands campaign in the closing stages of the Pacific War. This was reportedly the farthest-range and also the last bombing mission in World War II, coming only hours before Japan announced its surrender.

== Background ==
The town of Tsuchizaki was a major port on the Sea of Japan coast, railway nexus, and an important center for oil refineries fed by nearby oil fields. The town was incorporated into the neighboring city of Akita on April 1, 1941. Despite its military significance, it had not been attacked during the initial stages of the strategic bombing campaign, partly due to its remote location.

== Air raid ==
On August 14, 1945, the night before the surrender of Japan, a force of 134 B-29 Superfortress bombers from the USAAF 315th Bombardment Wing launched a major bombing attack on the coastal part of the city.

The bombers arrived over target without opposition at 2230 hours on the night of August 14, and dropped a total of 7,360 100-kg and 4,687 50-kg bombs, with the final bomber departing the target area at 0330 on the morning of August 15. The bombs completely destroyed the oil refinery belonging to Nippon Oil (the current JX Nippon Oil & Energy Co) and adjacent port facilities, and the resulting fire spread to the neighboring town. The estimated civilian casualties were more than 250 people killed, and an estimated 200 were severely injured.

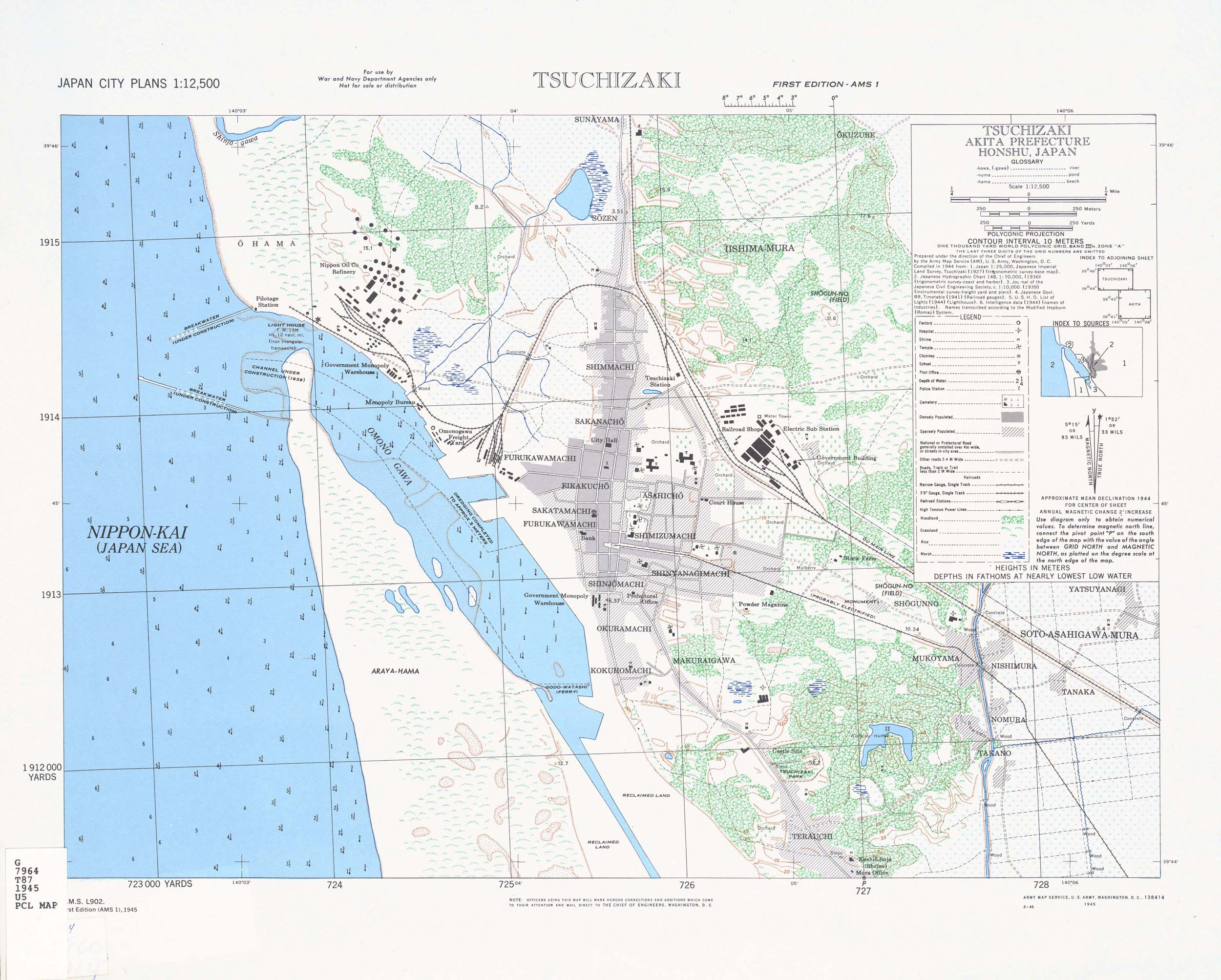
Tsuchizaki map in 1945

== See also ==
- Air raids on Japan
- Evacuations of civilians in Japan during World War II
