= Tsuchizaki Shinmeisha Shrine Annual Celebration And The Float Festival =

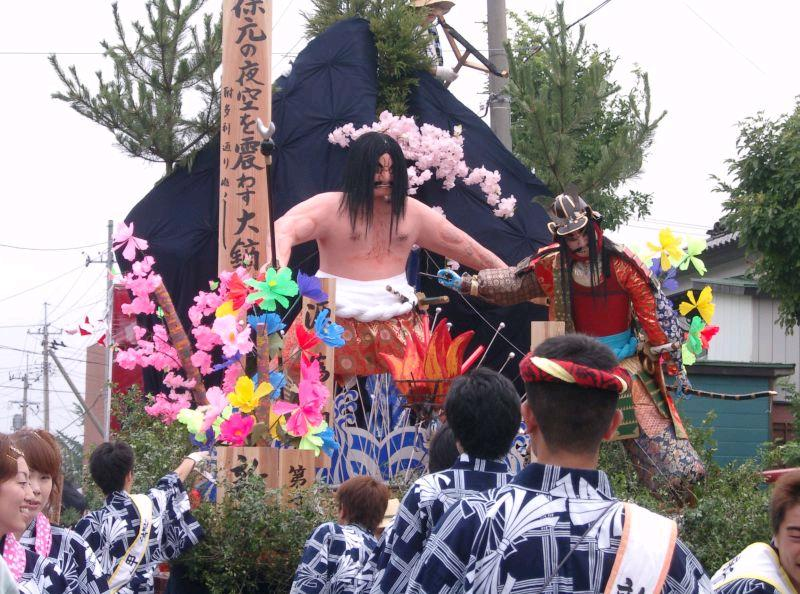
The front of The Float

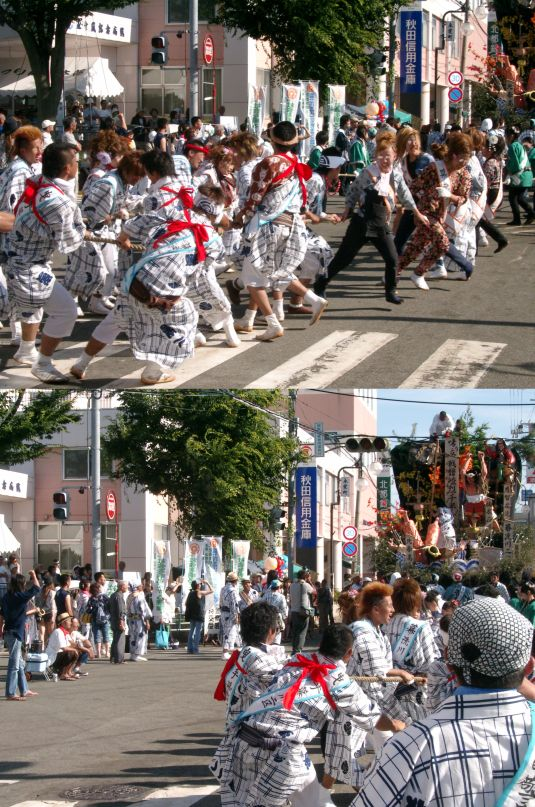
The rope of The Float is not only pulled but swung wildly. (July 21st)

Tsuchizaki Shinmeisha Shrine Annual Celebration And The Float Festival ("土崎神明社例祭", "土崎神明社祭の曳山行事") is a Japanese festival celebrated from 20 to 21 July in Tsuchizaki (Tsuchizakiminato), the port area of Akita City, Akita Prefecture, Japan.

Approximately 20 floats are dedicated and parade.

Its rites centre on the Shinmeisha shrine. Each neighbourhood contributes a float decorated with giant figures. In 1997 it was designated an Important Intangible Folk Cultural Property. In 2016, the festival was inscribed on the UNESCO Representative List of the Intangible Cultural Heritage of Humanity as part of the "Yama, Hoko, Yatai, float festivals in Japan" element, together with 32 other float festivals from across Japan. On 11 December 2025, the scope of the inscription was extended with the addition of four more float festivals.

== The back of The Float and The Music Band ==
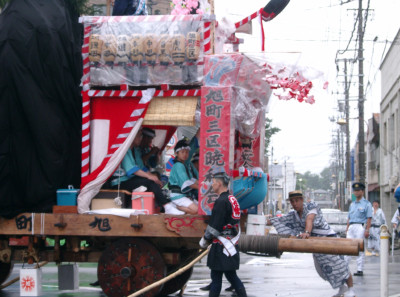

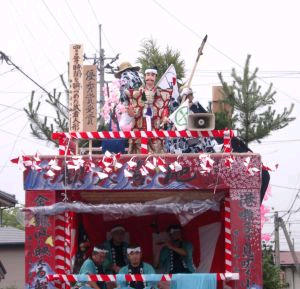

== July 20th ==
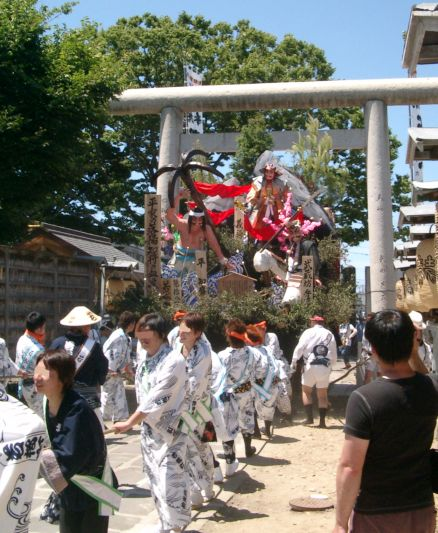

== July 21st ==
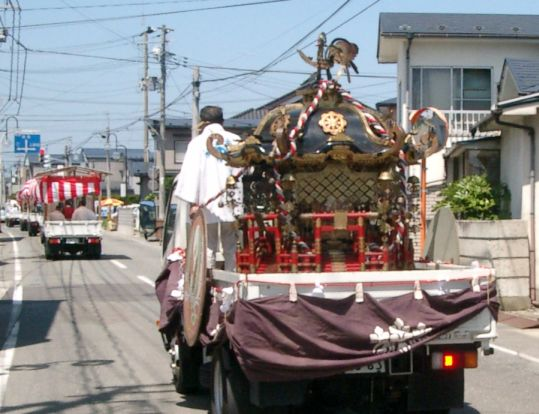

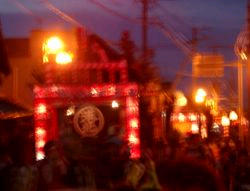

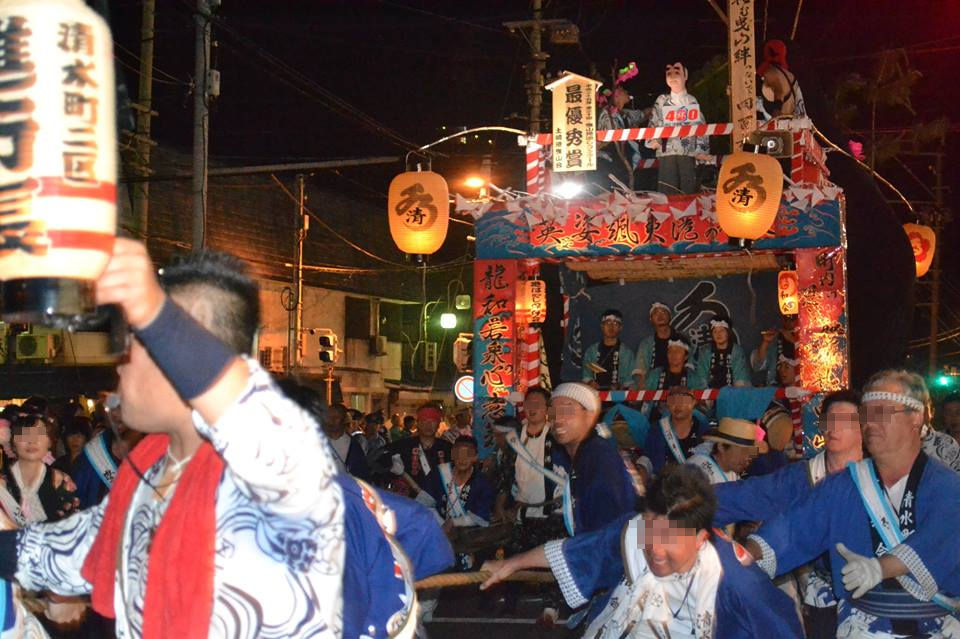
July 21 night

== Access ==
The exit station is Tsuchizaki Station (north next of Akita Station).

Walk straight from the exit of the station and you can soon see Tsuchizaki Shinmeisha Shrine on your left. And little more walk leads to the main street of The Float Festival.

== See also ==
- Matsuri
- List of Important Intangible Folk Cultural Properties
- Important Intangible Cultural Properties of Japan
