= Port of Akita =

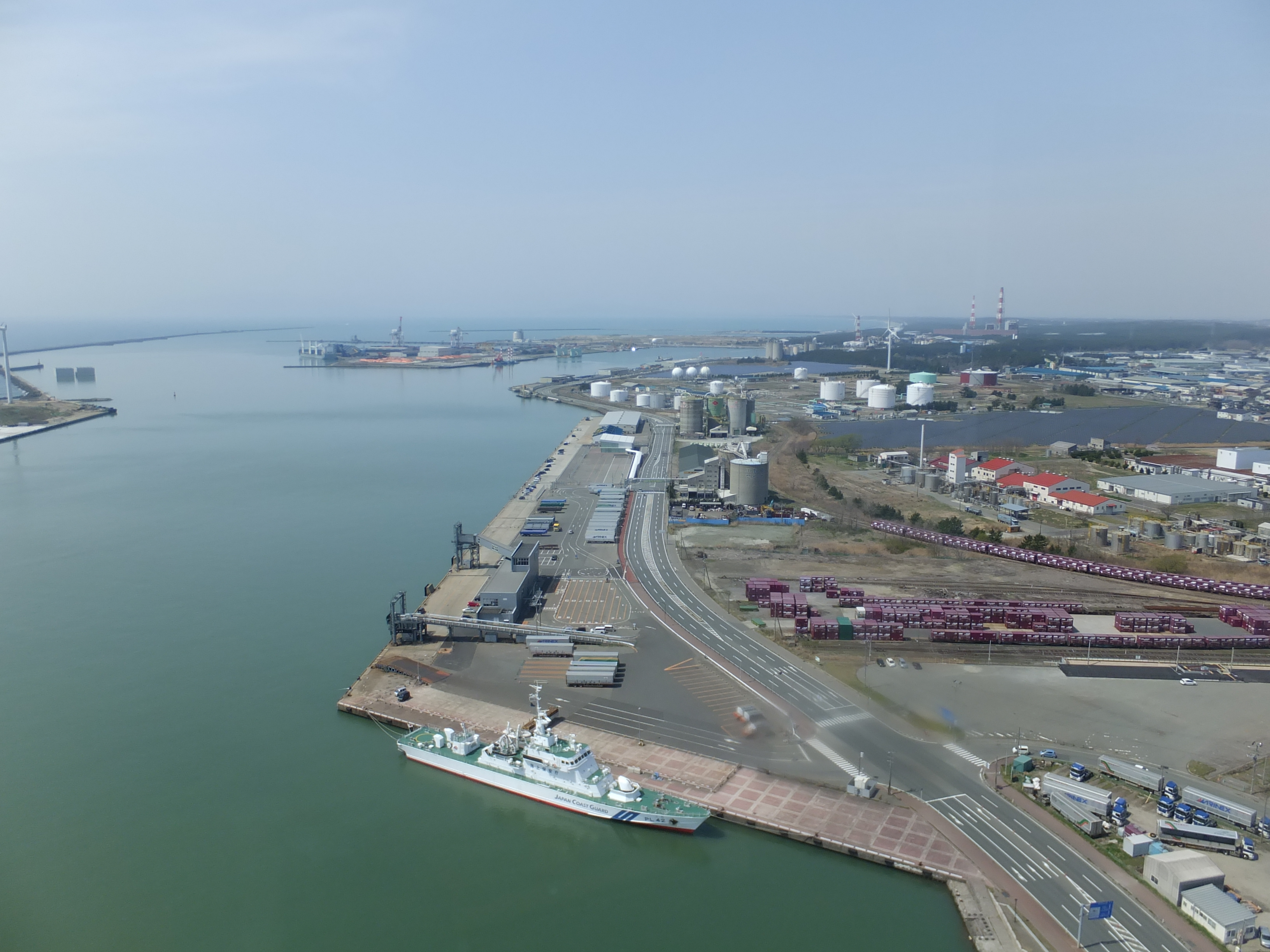
- Interactive map of Port of Akita
- Location within Japan Location within Akita Prefecture

Location
- Country: Japan
- Location: Tsuchizaki-Minato, Akita
- Coordinates: 39°45′34.25″N 140°2′33.95″E

Details
- Opened: 1965
- Operated by: Akita Prefecture
- Type of Harbor: Seaport
- Land area: 662.5 hectares

Statistics
- Vessel arrivals: 2,539
- Annual cargo tonnage: 7,628,942t (2017)
- Annual container volume: 50,678 TEU
- Passenger traffic: 77,413

The Port of Akita (秋田港, Akita-kō), formerly known as Port of Tsuchizaki, is a seaport on the Sea of Japan coast of Akita Prefecture, to the west of the city center of Akita in the Tōhoku region of northern Honshū, Japan. It is classified as a Major Port (重要港湾, Jūyō-kōwan) by the Japanese government. The port has a total land area of 662.5 hectares (1,637 acres).

== History ==
In AD 727 the envoys from Bokkai (Balhae) sailed the Sea of Japan and were calling at Akita Port for the first time. In the oldest Japanese marine law Kaisenshikimoku, Tsuchizaki Minato, former name of Akita Port, was referred to as the ten biggest ports in Japan. Tsuchizaki was just mentioned as "Minato (port)" in the Japanese historical references which suggests the harbour was the port of all ports. During the Edo period, Akita was an important port of call on the Kitamaebune route of coastal trade from Osaka to Hokkaido and an important source of revenue for the Satake clan’s Kubota Domain. In modern times, during the Meiji period a breakwater was completed in 1885 and enlarged in 1902, and Tsuchizakiko Port was designated a “secondary port” by the Japanese government in 1910. When the town of Tsuchizaki was annexed by the city of Akita in 1941, the port was officially renamed “Akita Port”. The port facilities were extensively damaged in American air raids on August 14, 1945.

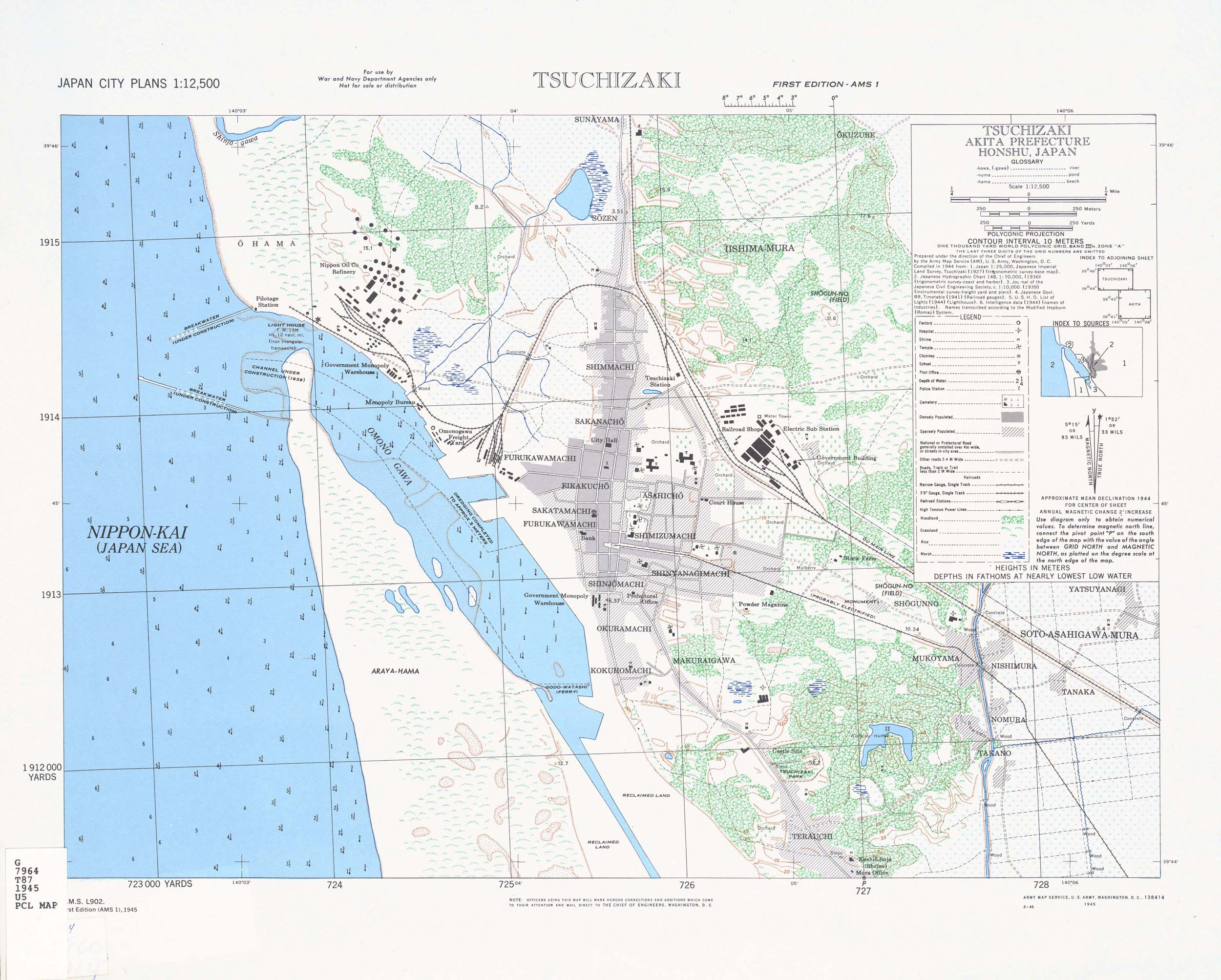
Tsuchizaki map in 1945

After World War II, the port was improved, with the breakwater extended partly though the sinking of the hulks of the kaibokan Ikara and destroyers Momo and Take. Akita Port received the designation of “major port” from the Japanese government on January 19, 1951, and “special port” designation in 1962. A customs office was opened in 1964, permitting international trade. The Akita Northern Port extension was opened in 1970.

The Akita Offshore Wind Corporation has been implementing the first large-scale offshore wind power projects on a commercial basis in Japan at Akita Port, and the Port of Noshiro (both in Akita Prefecture).

== Passenger terminal ==
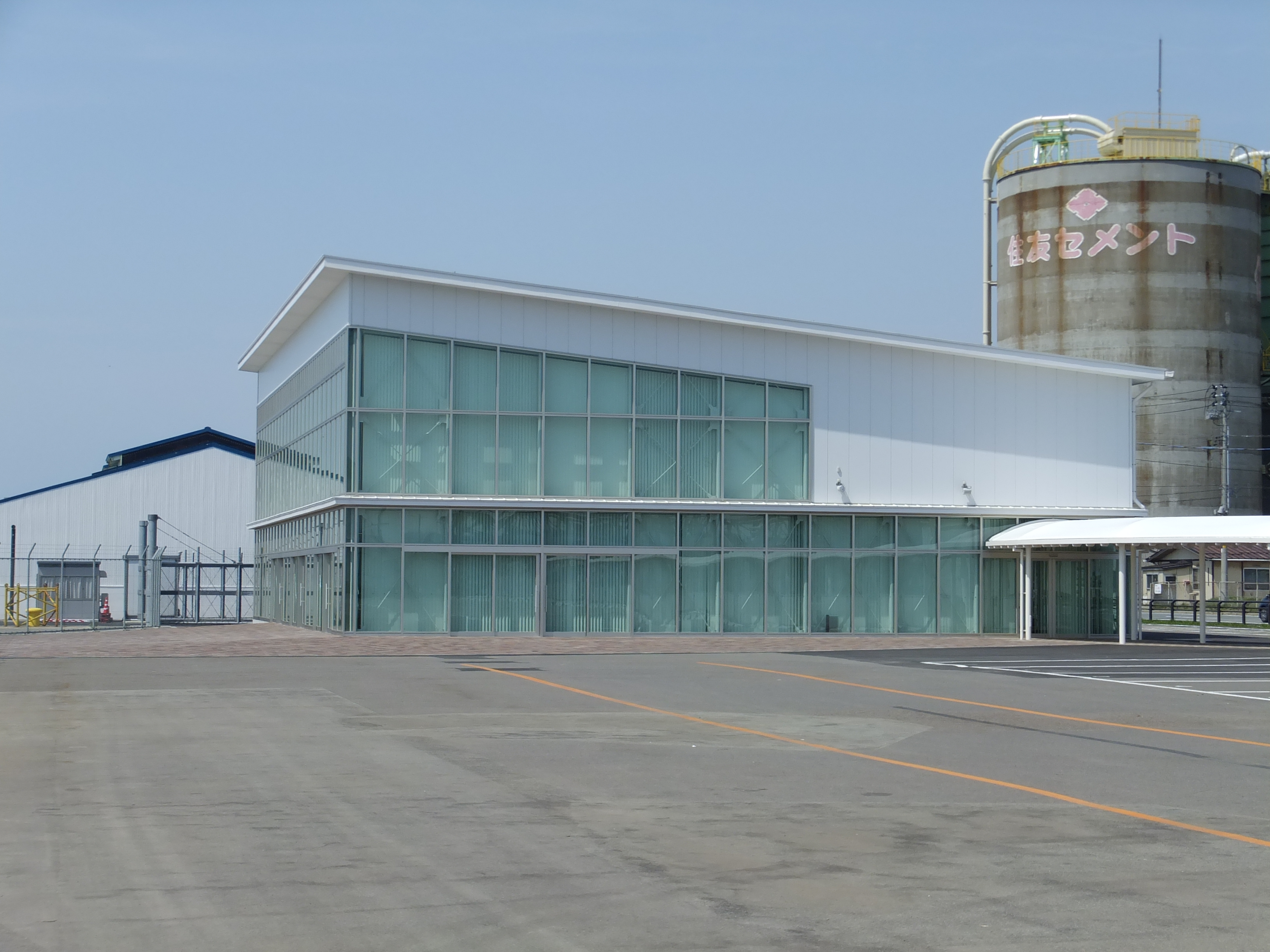
Passenger terminal

A passenger terminal is located near the Nakajima pier.

=== Destination ===
- Tomakomai
- Niigata
- Tsuruga

== See also ==
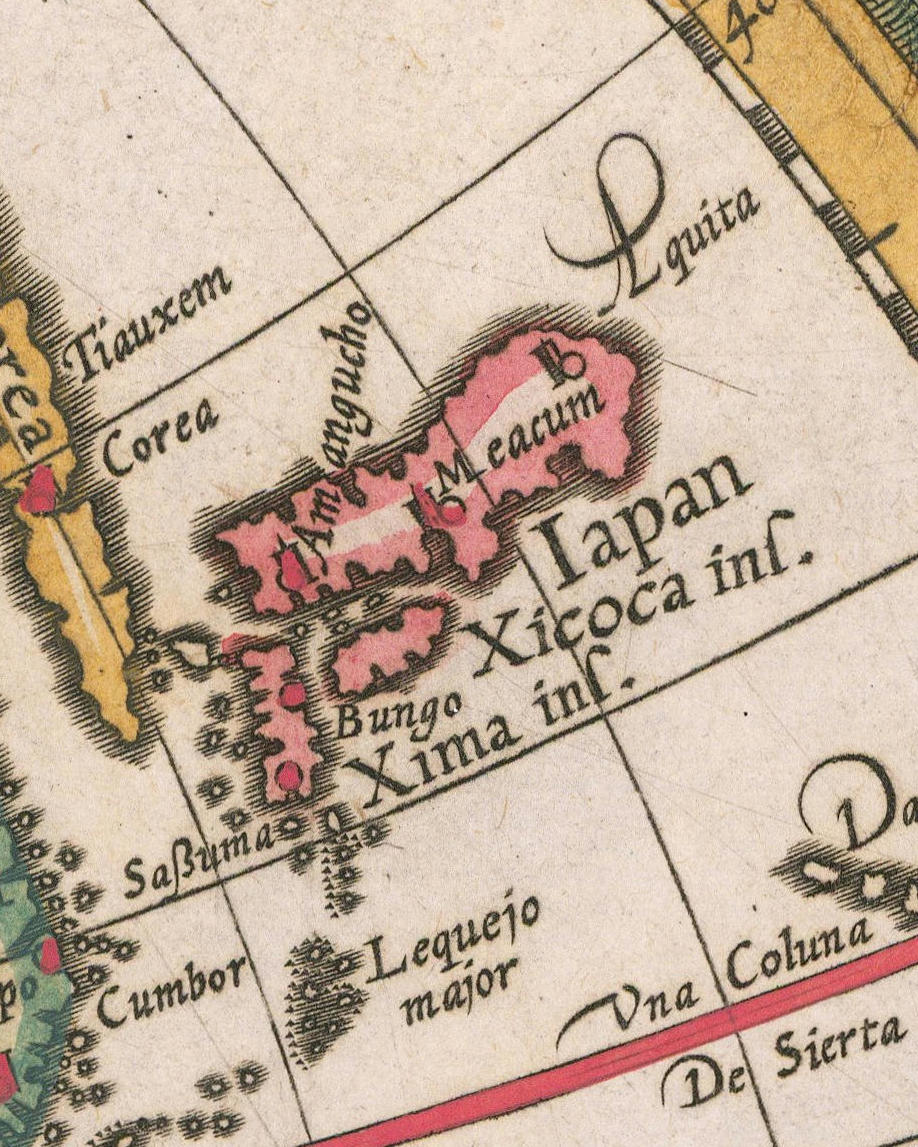
In this 1596 Word map, Port of Akita is described as "Aquita"

- Akita Port Tower Selion
