= Kikuchi Line =

Railway line in Kumamoto Prefecture, Japan

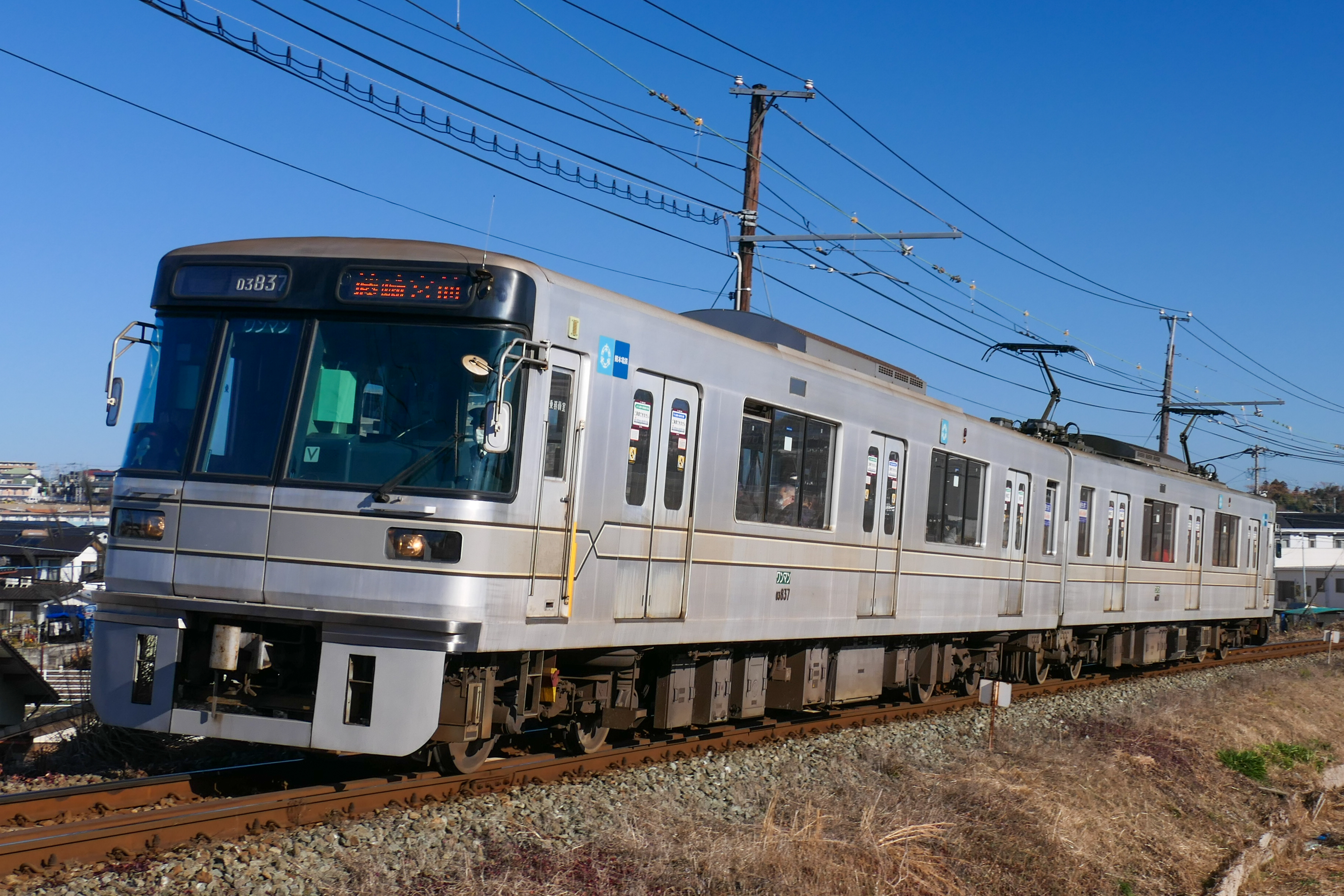
- Type 03 running on the Kikuchi Line.

Overview
- Native name: 菊池線
- Owner: Kumamoto Electric Railway
- Locale: Kumamoto Prefecture
- Termini: Kami-Kumamoto; Miyoshi
- Stations: 16
- Website: www.kumamotodentetsu.co.jp

Service
- Type: Heavy rail

History
- Opened: 15 March 1913

Technical
- Line length: 10.8 km (6.7 mi)
- Track gauge: 1,067 mm (3 ft 6 in)
- Electrification: Overhead line, DC 600 V

Kikuchi Line (菊池線, Kikuchi-sen) is a 10.8 km railway line owned by the Kumamoto Electric Railway, serving Kumamoto City and Kōshi, Kumamoto Prefecture, Japan. The line runs northward from Kami-Kumamoto Station on the Kagoshima Main Line, operated by JR Kyushu, terminating at Miyoshi Station.

Previously, the line ran as far as Kikuchi, Kumamoto, an onsen resort town. However, ticket sales were replaced with road traffic on Japan National Route 387, and the section between Miyoshi and Kikuchi ceased operations on February 16, 1986.

== Operations ==
The line is electrified with overhead lines and is single-tracked for the entire line. Passing loops are located at Horikawa Station and Kuroishi Station. Kita-Kumamoto Station has a passing loop for trains continuing on the Fujisaki Line

Two types of passenger services run on the line. The first runs between Kami-Kumamoto Station and Kita-Kumamoto Station, while the second runs between Fujisakigū-mae Station on the Fujisaki Line to Miyoshi Station, running through Kita-Kumamoto. Both types of services stop at every station. Busses operated by the Kumamoto Electric Railway connect Miyoshi with Kikuchi along the abolished track.

== Stations ==
=== Current stations ===
No.	Name		Distance (km)	Connections	Location	
KD01	Kami-Kumamoto	上熊本	0.0	JR Kyushu: Kagoshima Main Line; Kumamoto City Tram: Kami-Kumamoto Line	Kumamoto	Kumamoto
KD02	Kankanzaka	韓々坂	0.7		Kumamoto	Kumamoto
KD03	Ikeda	池田	1.4		Kumamoto	Kumamoto
KD04	Uchigoshi	打越	2.1		Kumamoto	Kumamoto
KD05	Tsuboigawa-kōen	坪井川公園	2.6		Kumamoto	Kumamoto
KD08	Kita-Kumamoto	北熊本	3.4	Kumaden: Fujisaki Line	Kumamoto	Kumamoto
KD10	Kamei	亀井	4.6		Kumamoto	Kumamoto
KD11	Hakenomiya	八景水谷	5.0		Kumamoto	Kumamoto
KD12	Horikawa	堀川	5.9		Kumamoto	Kumamoto
KD13	Shin-Suya	新須屋	6.9		Kumamoto	Kōshi
KD14	Suya	須屋	7.4		Kumamoto	Kōshi
KD15	Mitsuishi	三ツ石	8.2		Kumamoto	Kōshi
KD16	Kuroishi	黒石	9.0		Kumamoto	Kōshi
KD17	Kumamotokōsen-mae	熊本高専前	9.9		Kumamoto	Kōshi
KD18	Saishun Iryō Center Mae	再春医療センター前	10.3		Kumamoto	Kōshi
KD19	Miyoshi	御代志	10.8		Kumamoto	Kōshi

=== Terminated stations ===
Name		Distance (km)	Location	
Ōike	大池	12.0	Kumamoto	Kōshi
Tsujikubo	辻久保	13.3	Kumamoto	Kōshi
Takae	高江駅	15.4	Kumamoto	Kōshi
Shisui	泗水	15.9	Kumamoto	Kikuchi
Tominohara	富の原	18.1	Kumamoto	Kikuchi
Hirose	広瀬	21.1	Kumamoto	Kikuchi
Fukagawa	深川	19.7	Kumamoto	Kikuchi
Kikuchi	菊池	24.3	Kumamoto	Kikuchi
