= Kankanzaka Station =

Railway station located in Kumamoto City, Kumamoto

Kankanzaka Station 韓々坂駅
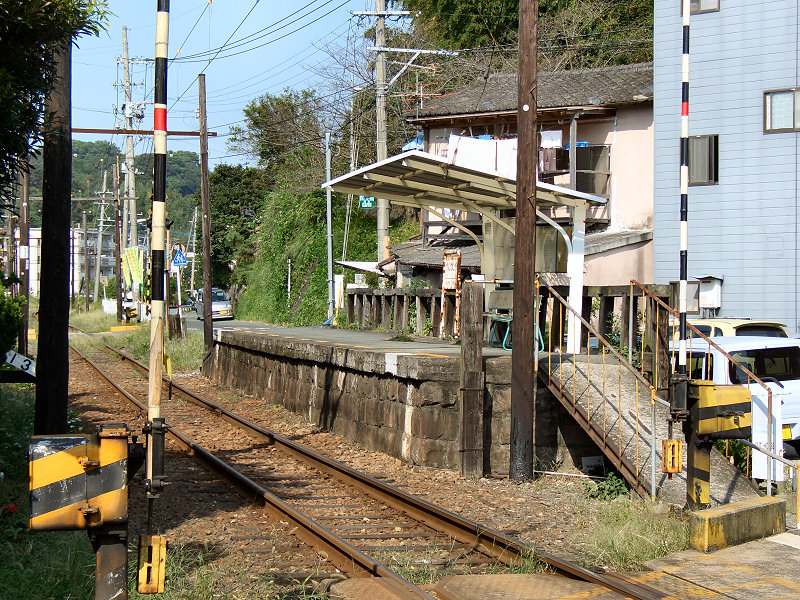
- Kankanzaka Station platform

General information
- Location: 3-chōme-13 Kamikumamoto, Nishi-ku, Kumamoto-shi, Kumamoto-ken 860-0079; Japan
- Coordinates: 32.8241°N 130.7019°E
- Operator: Kumamoto Electric Railway
- Line: ■ Kikuchi Line
- Distance: 0.7 km from Kami-Kumamoto
- Platforms: 1 side platform

Other information
- Station code: KD02

History
- Opened: 1 December 1955

Passengers
- FY2018: 184

Services
Preceding station	Kumamoto Electric Railway	Following station
Kami-Kumamoto Terminus	Kikuchi Line	Ikeda towards Miyoshi
Location
- Location within Kumamoto Prefecture Location within Japan

Kankanzaka Station (韓々坂駅, Kankanzaka-eki) is a passenger railway station located in the Kita-ku ward of the city of Kumamoto, Kumamoto Prefecture, Japan. It is operated by the private transportation company Kumamoto Electric Railway.

== Lines ==
The station is served by the Kikuchi Line and is located 0.7 bsp;km from the starting point of the line at Kami-Kumamoto.Only local trains serve the station

== Layout ==
Kankanzaka Station is a ground-level station with one short side platform suitable for only one carriage in length. There is no station building and the station is unattended.

== History ==
The station was opened on 1 December 1955.

== Passenger statistics ==
In fiscal 2018 the station was used by an average of 184 passengers daily.

== Surrounding area ==
- Kumamoto City Ikeda Elementary School

== See also ==
- List of railway stations in Japan
