= Hakenomiya Station =

Railway station located in Kumamoto City, Kumamoto

Hakenomiya Station 八景水谷駅
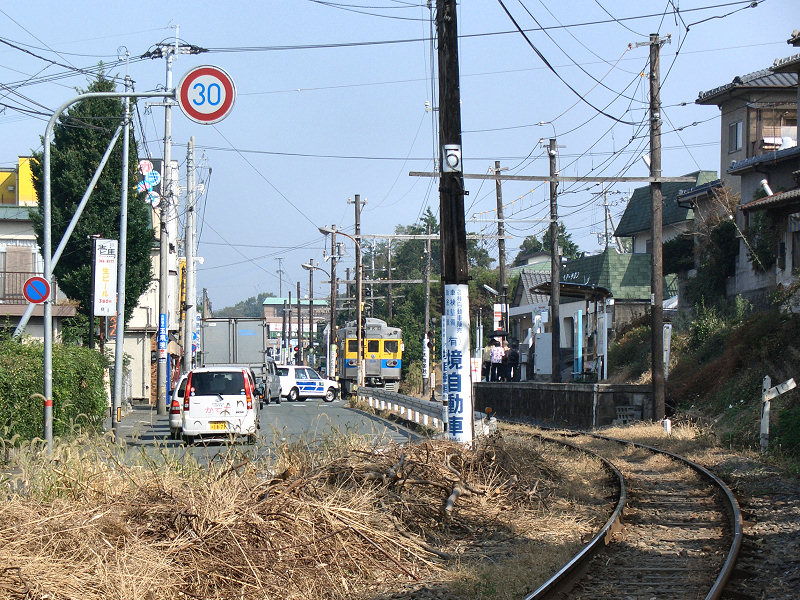
- Hakenomiya Station platform

General information
- Location: 58 Shimizukameimachi, Kita-ku, Kumamoto-shi, Kumamoto-ken, 861-8066; Japan
- Coordinates: 32.8414°N 130.7228°E
- Operator: Kumamoto Electric Railway
- Line: ■ Kikuchi Line
- Distance: 5.0 km from Kami-Kumamoto
- Platforms: 1 side platform

Other information
- Station code: KD11

History
- Opened: 26 August 1913

Services
FY2018
Preceding station	Kumamoto Electric Railway	Following station
Kamei towards Kami-Kumamoto	Kikuchi Line	Horikawa towards Miyoshi
Location
- Location within Kumamoto Prefecture Location within Japan

Hakenomiya Station (八景水谷駅, Hakenomiya-eki) is a passenger railway station located in the Kita-ku ward of the city of Kumamoto, Kumamoto Prefecture, Japan. It is operated by the private transportation company Kumamoto Electric Railway.

== Lines ==
The station is served by the Kikuchi Line and is located 5.0 bsp;km from the starting point of the line at Kami-Kumamoto.Only local trains serve the station

== Layout ==
Hakenomiya Station is a ground-level station with one side platform. The station does not have a station building and is unattended.

== History ==
The station was opened on 26 August 1913.

== Passenger statistics ==
In fiscal 2018 the station was used by an average of 286 passengers daily.

== Surrounding area ==
- Kumamoto City Water Science Museum
- Kumamoto City Kita Ward Office Shimizu Branch
- Japan Ground Self-Defense Force Kita-Kumamoto Garrison

== See also ==
- List of railway stations in Japan
