= Shin-Suya Station =

Railway station located in Kōshi, Kumamoto

Shin-Suya Station 新須屋駅
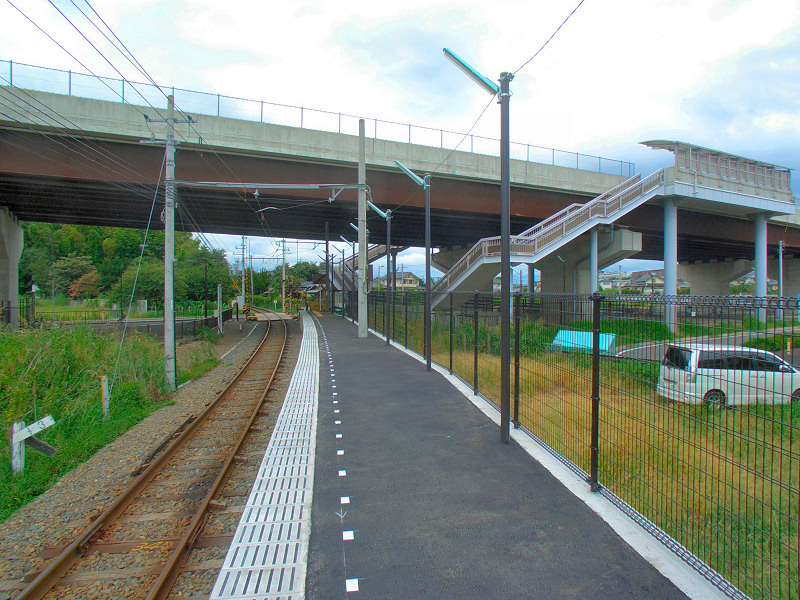
- Shin-Suya Station platform

General information
- Location: 583-2 Kawazoe, Suya, Kōshi-shi, Kumamoto-ken; Japan
- Coordinates: 32.8539°N 130.7325°E
- Operator: Kumamoto Electric Railway
- Line: ■ Kikuchi Line
- Platforms: 1 side platform

Other information
- Station code: KD13

History
- Opened: 1 September 1984

Passengers
- FY2020: 758

Services
Preceding station	Kumamoto Electric Railway	Following station
Horikawa towards Kami-Kumamoto	Kikuchi Line	Suya towards Miyoshi
Location
- Location within Kumamoto Prefecture Location within Japan

Shin-Suya Station (新須屋駅, Shin-Suya-eki) is a passenger railway station located in the city of Kōshi, Kumamoto Prefecture, Japan. It is operated by the private transportation company Kumamoto Electric Railway.

== Lines ==
The station is served by the Kikuchi Line and is located 6.9 km from the starting point of the line at Kami-Kumamoto.Only local trains serve the station

== Layout ==
Shin-Suya Station is a ground-level station with one side platform and one track. There is no station building and the station is unattended.

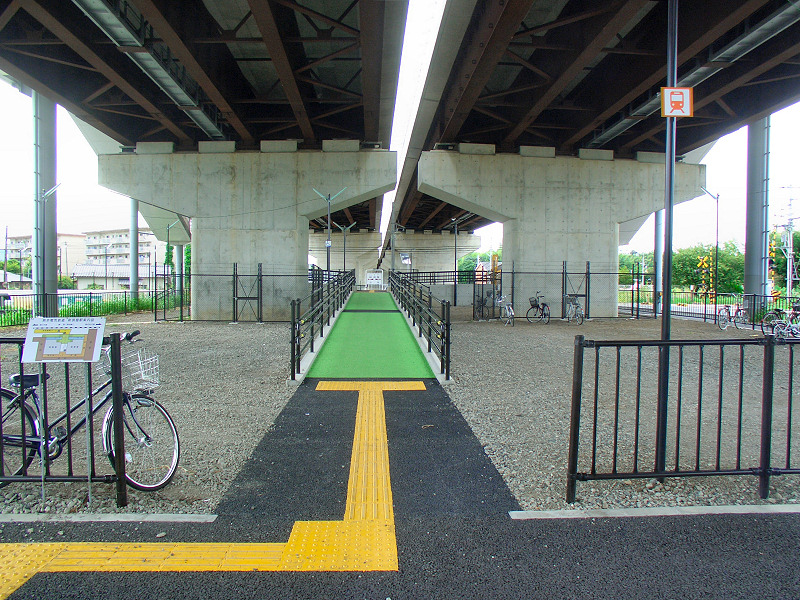
Entry

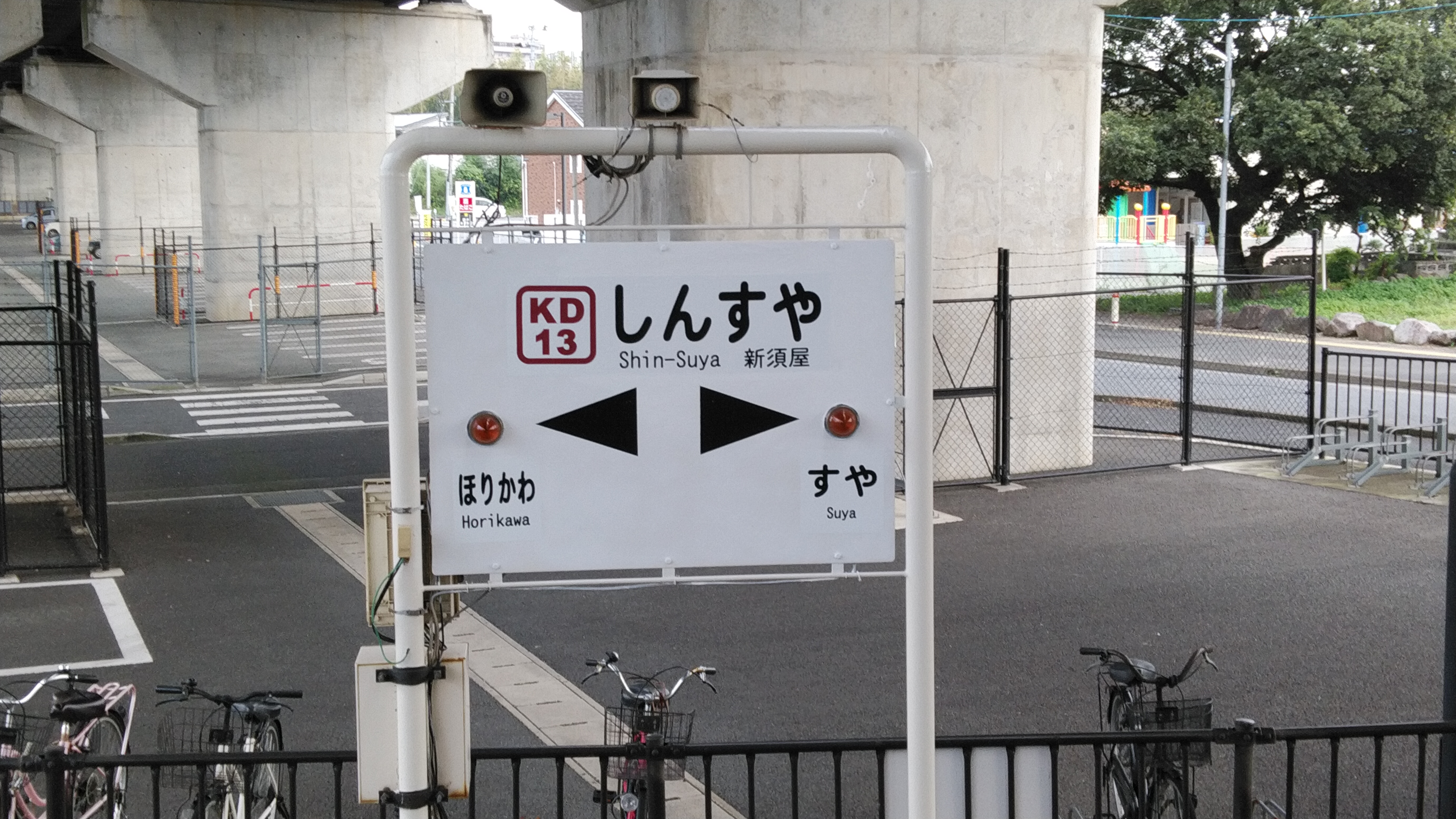
Signage

== History ==
The station was opened on September 1, 1984. On April 1, 2008 the station was relocated 260 meters towards Suya due to the extension of Japan National Route 3 Kumamoto North Bypass.

== Passenger statistics ==
In fiscal 2020, the station was used by an average of 758 passengers daily.

== Surrounding area ==
- Japan National Route 387
- Nakayama Memorial Hospital
- Kikunan Hospital
- Kikunan Onsen
- Prefectural Suya Housing Complex

== See also ==
- List of railway stations in Japan
