= Uchigoshi Station =

Railway station located in Kumamoto City, Kumamoto

Uchigoshi Station 打越駅
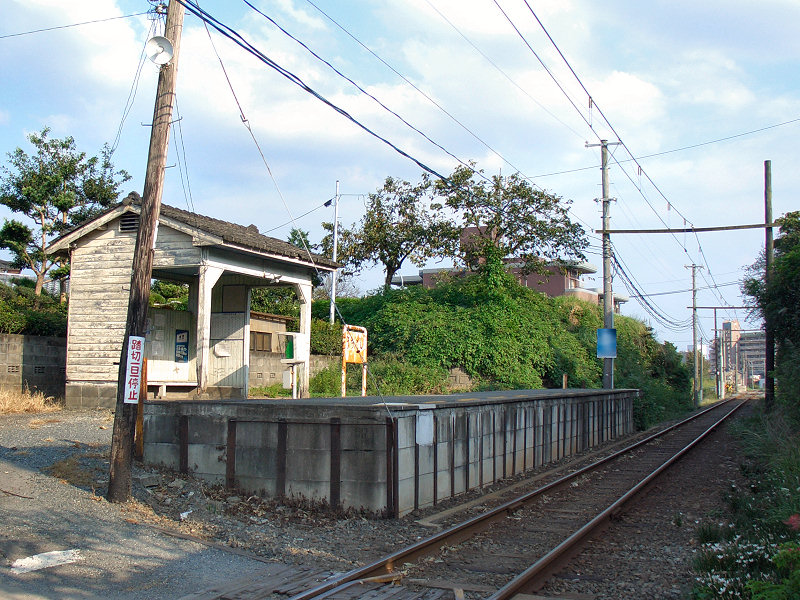
- Uchigoshi Station platform

General information
- Location: 3 Uchigoshimachi, Kita-ku, Kumamoto-shi, Kumamoto-ken 860-0086; Japan
- Coordinates: 32.8237°N 130.7138°E
- Operator: Kumamoto Electric Railway
- Line: ■ Kikuchi Line
- Distance: 2.1 km from Kami-Kumamoto
- Platforms: 1 side platform

Other information
- Station code: KD04

History
- Opened: 15 March 1953

Passengers
- FY2018: 87

Services
Preceding station	Kumamoto Electric Railway	Following station
Ikeda towards Kami-Kumamoto	Kikuchi Line	Tsuboigawa-kōen towards Miyoshi
Location
- Location within Kumamoto Prefecture Location within Japan

Uchigoshi Station (打越駅, Uchigoshi-eki) is a passenger railway station located in the Kita-ku ward of the city of Kumamoto, Kumamoto Prefecture, Japan. It is operated by the private transportation company Kumamoto Electric Railway.

== Lines ==
The station is served by the Kikuchi Line and is located 2.1 km from the starting point of the line at Kami-Kumamoto.Only local trains serve the station

== Layout ==
Uchigoshi Station is a ground-level station with one side platform. There is no station building and the station is unattended.

== History ==
The station was opened on 15 March 1953.

== Passenger statistics ==
In fiscal 2018 the station was used by an average of 87 passengers daily.

== Surrounding area ==
- NTT Training Center
- Tsuboigawa Green Space
- Kumamoto Prefectural Shimizugaoka Gakuen

== See also ==
- List of railway stations in Japan
