= Kamei Station =

Railway station located in Kumamoto City, Kumamoto

Kamei Station 亀井駅
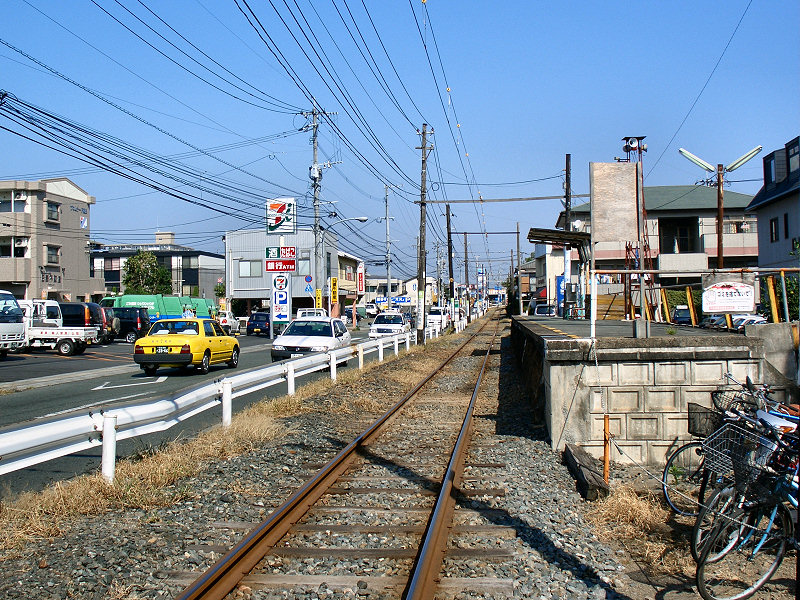
- Kamei Station platform

General information
- Location: 46 Shimizukameimachi, Kita-ku, Kumamoto-shi, Kumamoto-ken, 861-8066; Japan
- Coordinates: 32.8374°N 130.7222°E
- Operator: Kumamoto Electric Railway
- Line: ■ Kikuchi Line
- Distance: 4.6 km from Kami-Kumamoto
- Platforms: 1 side platform

Other information
- Station code: KD10

History
- Opened: 27 August 1913

Passengers
- FY2018: 402

Services
Preceding station	Kumamoto Electric Railway	Following station
Kita-Kumamoto towards Kami-Kumamoto	Kikuchi Line	Hakenomiya towards Miyoshi
Location
- Location within Kumamoto Prefecture Location within Japan

Kamei Station (亀井駅, Kamei-eki) is a passenger railway station located in the Kita-ku ward of the city of Kumamoto, Kumamoto Prefecture, Japan. It is operated by the private transportation company Kumamoto Electric Railway.

== Lines ==
The station is served by the Kikuchi Line and is located 4.6 bsp;km from the starting point of the line at Kami-Kumamoto.Only local trains serve the station

== Layout ==
Kamei Station is a ground-level station with one side platform. There is no station building and the station is unattended.

== History ==
The station was opened on 26 August 1913.

== Passenger statistics ==
In fiscal 2018 the station was used by an average of 402 passengers daily.

== Surrounding area ==
- Japan National Route 3
- Kumamoto City Shimizu Elementary School

== See also ==
- List of railway stations in Japan
