= Horikawa Station =

Railway station located in Kumamoto City, Kumamoto

Horikawa Station 堀川駅
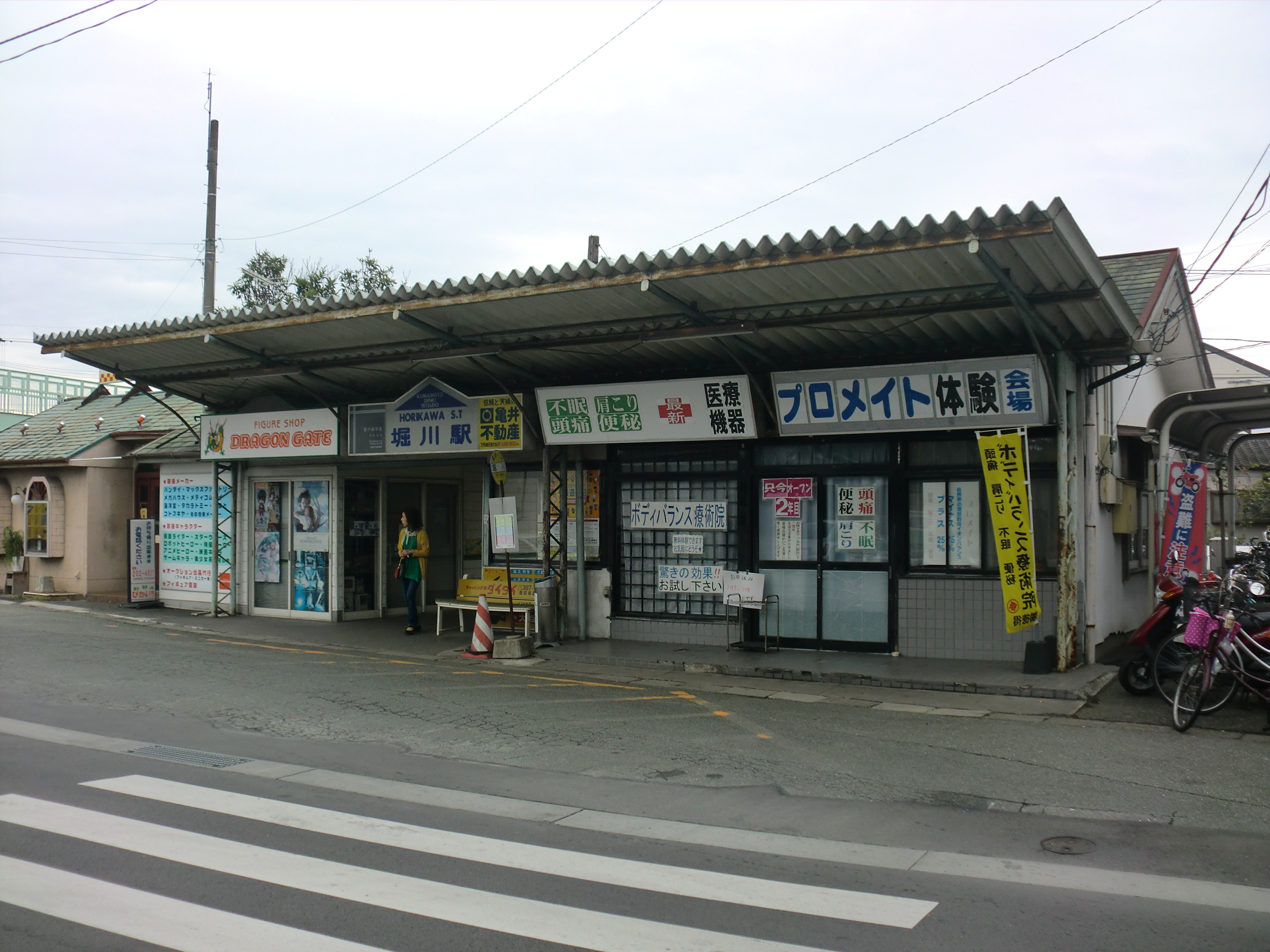
- Station entrance

General information
- Location: 1-chōme-24 Hakenomiya, Kita-ku, Kumamoto-shi, Kumamoto-ken, 861-8064; Japan
- Coordinates: 32.8492°N 130.7253°E
- Operator: Kumamoto Electric Railway
- Line: ■ Kikuchi Line
- Distance: 5.9 km from Kami-Kumamoto
- Platforms: 1 island platform

Other information
- Station code: KD12

History
- Opened: 26 August 1913

Services
Preceding station	Kumamoto Electric Railway	Following station
Hakenomiya towards Kami-Kumamoto	Kikuchi Line	Shin-Suya towards Miyoshi
Location
- Location within Kumamoto Prefecture Location within Japan

Horikawa Station (堀川駅, Horikawa-eki) is a passenger railway station located in the Kita-ku ward of the city of Kumamoto, Kumamoto Prefecture, Japan. It is operated by the private transportation company Kumamoto Electric Railway.

== Lines ==
The station is served by the Kikuchi Line and is located 5.9 km from the starting point of the line at Kami-Kumamoto.Only local trains serve the station

== Layout ==
Horikawa Station is a ground-level station with one island platform with a level crossing. One of the Kikuchi Line's two passing loops are located here.

=== Platforms ===
1	■ ■ Kikuchi Line	for Miyoshi
2	■ ■ Kikuchi Line	for Kita-Kumamoto and Kami-Kumamoto

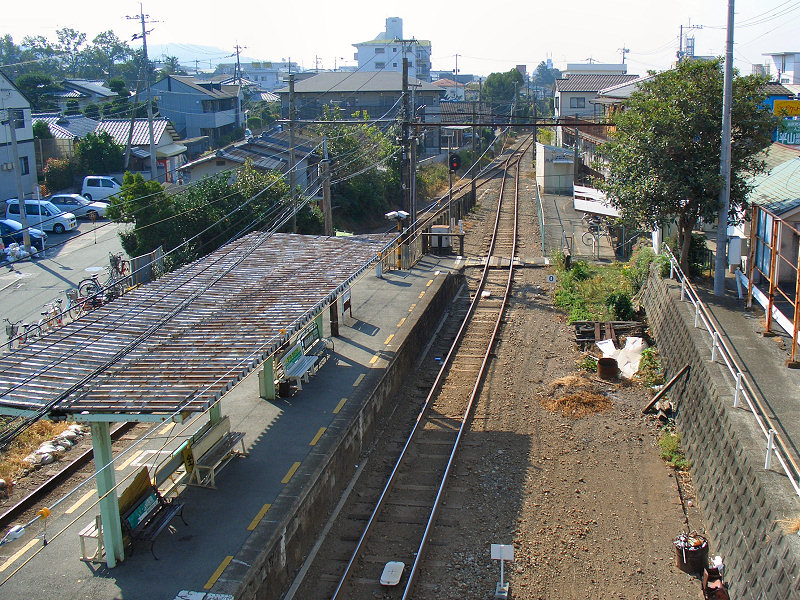
View of platform

== History ==
The station was opened on 26 August 1913.

== Passenger statistics ==
In fiscal 2018 the station was used by an average of 600 passengers daily.

== Surrounding area ==
- Kumamoto City Johoku Elementary School
- Kumamoto City Shimizu Junior High School
- Japan Ground Self-Defense Force Kita-Kumamoto Garrison

== See also ==
- List of railway stations in Japan
