= Tsuboigawa-kōen Station =

Railway station located in Kumamoto City, Kumamoto

Tsuboigawa-kōen Station 坪井川公園駅
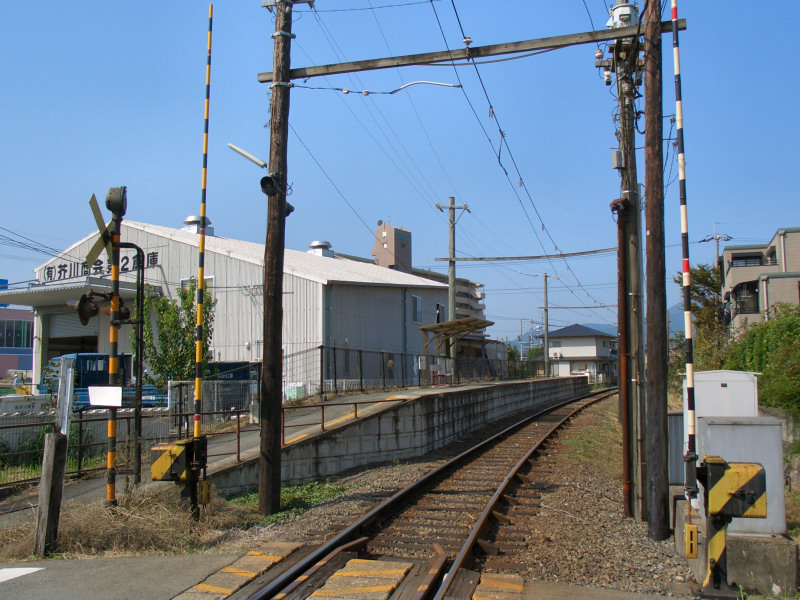
- Tsuboigawa-kōen Station platform

General information
- Location: 6-chōme-26 Tsuboi, Chuo-ku, Kumamoto-shi, Kumamoto-ken, 860-0863; Japan
- Coordinates: 32.8214°N 130.7185°E
- Operator: Kumamoto Electric Railway
- Line: ■ Kikuchi Line
- Distance: 2.6 km from Kami-Kumamoto
- Platforms: 1 side platform

Other information
- Station code: KD05

History
- Opened: 9 January 1995

Passengers
- FY2018: 192

Services
Preceding station	Kumamoto Electric Railway	Following station
Uchigoshi towards Kami-Kumamoto	Kikuchi Line	Kita-Kumamoto towards Miyoshi
Location
- Location within Kumamoto Prefecture Location within Japan

Tsuboigawa-kōen Station (坪井川公園駅, Tsuboigawa-kōen-eki) is a passenger railway station located in the Kita-ku ward of the city of Kumamoto, Kumamoto Prefecture, Japan. It is operated by the private transportation company Kumamoto Electric Railway.

== Lines ==
The station is served by the Kikuchi Line and is located 2.6 bsp;km from the starting point of the line at Kami-Kumamoto.Only local trains serve the station

== Layout ==
Tsuboigawa-kōen Station is a ground-level station with one side platform. There is no station building and the station is unattended.

== History ==
The station was opened on 9 January 1995

== Passenger statistics ==
In fiscal 2018 the station was used by an average of 192 passengers daily.

== Surrounding area ==
- Japan National Route 3
- Tsuboigawa Flood Control Park (Tsuboigawa Green Space)
- Tsuboi Central Park
- Inariyama Kofun (Prefecturally Designated Historic Site)

== See also ==
- List of railway stations in Japan
