= Kumamotokōsen-mae Station =

Railway station located in Kōshi, Kumamoto

Kumamotokōsen-mae Station 熊本高専前駅
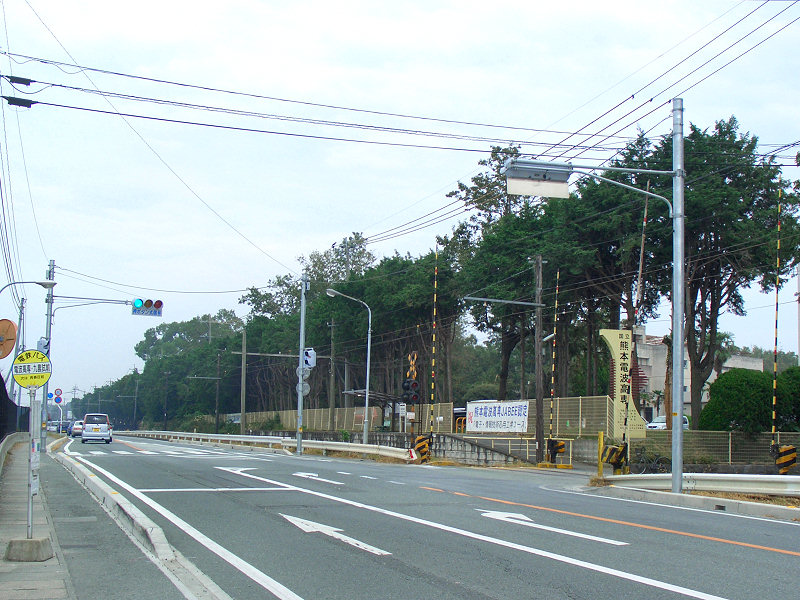
- Station platform

General information
- Location: Suya, Kōshi-shi, Kumamoto-ken 861-1102; Japan
- Coordinates: 32.8781°N 130.7462°E
- Operator: Kumamoto Electric Railway
- Line: ■ Kikuchi Line
- Distance: 9.9 km from Kami-Kumamoto
- Platforms: 1 side platform

Other information
- Station code: KD17

History
- Opened: 9 January 1995
- Former names: Denpa Kosen-mae Station (to 2013)

Passengers
- FY2018: 321

Services
Preceding station	Kumamoto Electric Railway	Following station
Kuroishi towards Kami-Kumamoto	Kikuchi Line	Saishun Iryō Center Mae towards Miyoshi
Location
- Location within Kumamoto Prefecture Location within Japan

Kumamotokōsen-mae Station (熊本高専前駅, Kumamotokōsen-mae-eki) located in the city of Kōshi, Kumamoto Prefecture, Japan. It is operated by the private transportation company Kumamoto Electric Railway.

== Lines ==
The station is served by the Kikuchi Line and is located 9.9 bsp;km from the starting point of the line at Kami-Kumamoto.Only local trains serve the station

== Layout ==
Kumamotokōsen-mae Station is a ground-level station with one side platform. There is no station building and the station is unattended.

== History ==
The station was opened on 9 January1995 as Denpa Kosen-mae Station (電波高専前駅) at the request of Kumamoto National College of Technology. The station was renamed on 31 March 2013 due to a change in the school's name.

== Passenger statistics ==
In fiscal 2018, the station was used by an average of 321 passengers daily.

== Surrounding area ==
- Kumamoto Employment Support Agency
- Kumamoto National College of Technology, Kumamoto Campus

== See also ==
- List of railway stations in Japan
