= Suya Station =

Railway station located in Kōshi, Kumamoto

Suya Station 須屋駅
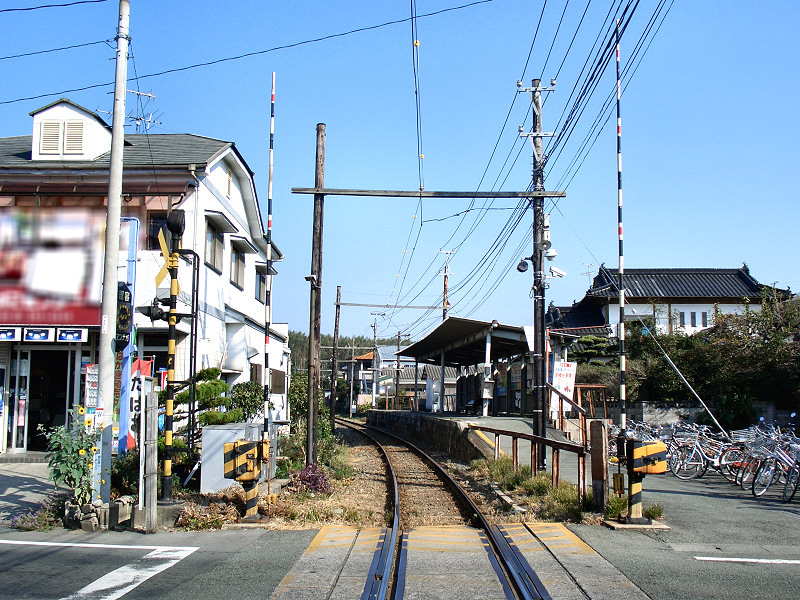
- Suya Station platform

General information
- Location: 1217-5 Sakoda, Suya, Kōshi-shi, Kumamoto-ken 861-1102; Japan
- Coordinates: 32.8576°N 130.7366°E
- Operator: Kumamoto Electric Railway
- Line: ■ Kikuchi Line
- Platforms: 1 side platform

Other information
- Station code: KD14

History
- Opened: 26 August 1913

Passengers
- FY2020: 342

Services
Preceding station	Kumamoto Electric Railway	Following station
Shin-Suya towards Kami-Kumamoto	Kikuchi Line	Mitsuishi towards Miyoshi
Location
- Location within Kumamoto Prefecture Location within Japan

Suya Station (須屋駅, Suya-eki) is a passenger railway station located in the city of Kōshi, Kumamoto Prefecture, Japan. It is operated by the private transportation company Kumamoto Electric Railway.

== Lines ==
The station is served by the Kikuchi Line and is located 7.4 km from the starting point of the line at Kami-Kumamoto. Only local trains serve the station

== Layout ==
Suya Station is a ground-level station with one side platform and one track. There is no station building, but only a rain shelter on the platform, and the station is unattended.

== History ==
The station was opened on 26 August 1913.

== Passenger statistics ==
In fiscal 2020, the station was used by an average of 342 passengers daily.

== Surrounding area ==
- Koshi City Nishigoshi Minami Elementary School
- Koshi City Hall Suya Branch

== See also ==
- List of railway stations in Japan
