= Ikeda Station (Kumamoto) =

Railway station located in Kumamoto City, Kumamoto

Ikeda Station 池田駅
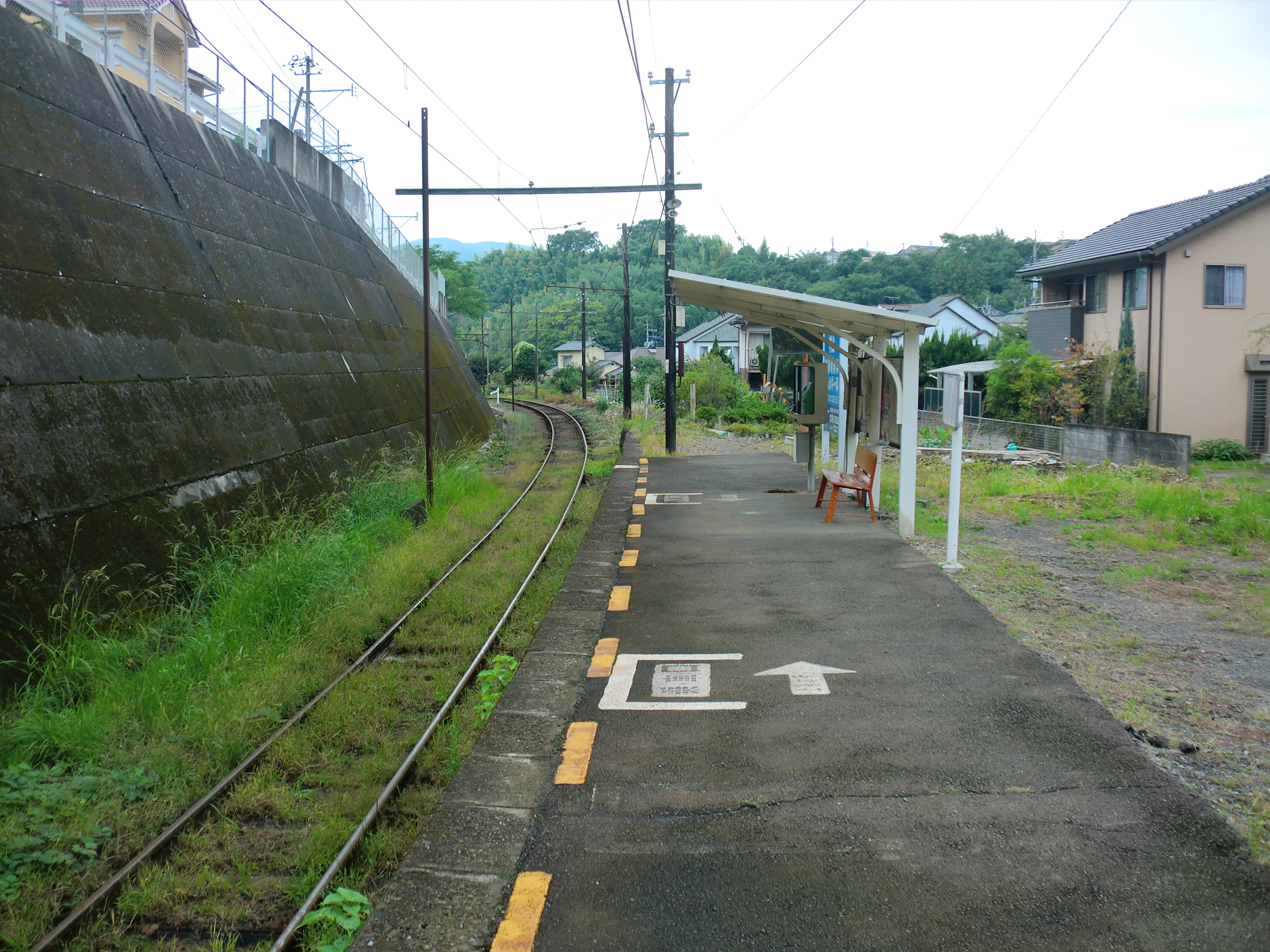
- Ikeda Station platform

General information
- Location: 2-chōme-10 Ikeda, Nishi-ku, Kumamoto-shi, Kumamoto-ken 860-0082; Japan
- Coordinates: 32.8267°N 130.7076°E
- Operator: Kumamoto Electric Railway
- Line: ■ Kikuchi Line
- Distance: 1.4 km from Kami-Kumamoto
- Platforms: 1 side platform

Other information
- Station code: KD03

History
- Opened: 1 October 1950

Passengers
- FY2018: 62

Services
Preceding station	Kumamoto Electric Railway	Following station
Kankanzaka towards Kami-Kumamoto	Kikuchi Line	Uchigoshi towards Miyoshi
Location
- Location within Kumamoto Prefecture Location within Japan

Ikeda Station (池田駅, Ikeda-eki) is a passenger railway station located in the Kita-ku ward of the city of Kumamoto, Kumamoto Prefecture, Japan. It is operated by the private transportation company Kumamoto Electric Railway.

== Lines ==
The station is served by the Kikuchi Line and is located 1.4 bsp;km from the starting point of the line at Kami-Kumamoto.Only local trains serve the station

== Layout ==
Ikeda Station is a ground-level station with one side platform. There is no station building and the station is unattended.

== History ==
The station was opened on 1 October 1950.

== Passenger statistics ==
In fiscal 2018 the station was used by an average of 62 passengers daily.

== Surrounding area ==
- Kumamoto City Ikeda Elementary School
- NTT Training Center
- Yamabushizuka (City-designated Historic Site)

== See also ==
- List of railway stations in Japan
