= Mitsuishi Station (Kumamoto) =

Railway station located in Kōshi, Kumamoto

Mitsuishi Station 三ツ石駅
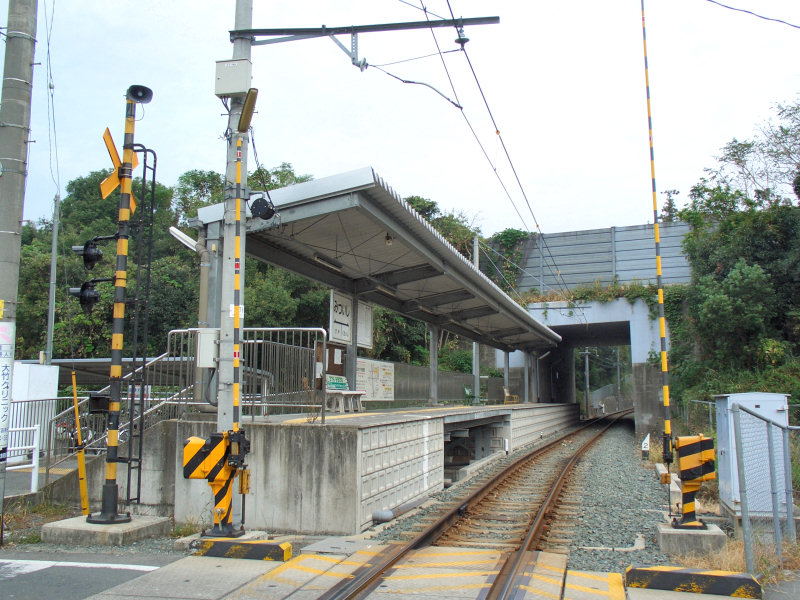
- Mitsuishi Station platform

General information
- Location: Suya, Kōshi-shi, Kumamoto-ken 861-1102; Japan
- Coordinates: 32.8641°N 130.7383°E
- Operator: Kumamoto Electric Railway
- Line: ■ Kikuchi Line
- Platforms: 1 side platform

Other information
- Station code: KD15

History
- Opened: 25 February 2001

Passengers
- FY2022: 292

Services
Preceding station	Kumamoto Electric Railway	Following station
Suya towards Kami-Kumamoto	Kikuchi Line	Kuroishi towards Miyoshi
Location
- Location within Kumamoto Prefecture Location within Japan

Mitsuishi Station (三ツ石駅, Mitsuish-eki) is a passenger railway station located in the city of Kōshi, Kumamoto Prefecture, Japan. It is operated by the private transportation company Kumamoto Electric Railway.

== Lines ==
The station is served by the Kikuchi Line and is located 8.2 km from the starting point of the line at Kami-Kumamoto.Only local trains serve the station

== Layout ==
Mitsuishi Station is a ground-level station with one side platform and one track. There is no station building, but only a rain shelter on the platform, and the station is unattended.

== History ==
The station was opened on 25 February 2001.

== Passenger statistics ==
In fiscal 2020, the station was used by an average of 292 passengers daily.

== Surrounding area ==
- Koshi City Nishigoshi Higashi Elementary School
- Koshi City Nishigoshi Minami Elementary School
- Koshi City Nishigoshi Minami Junior High School
- Japan National Route 387

== See also ==
- List of railway stations in Japan
