= Kuroishi Station (Kumamoto) =

Railway station located in Kōshi, Kumamoto

Kuroishi Station 黒石駅
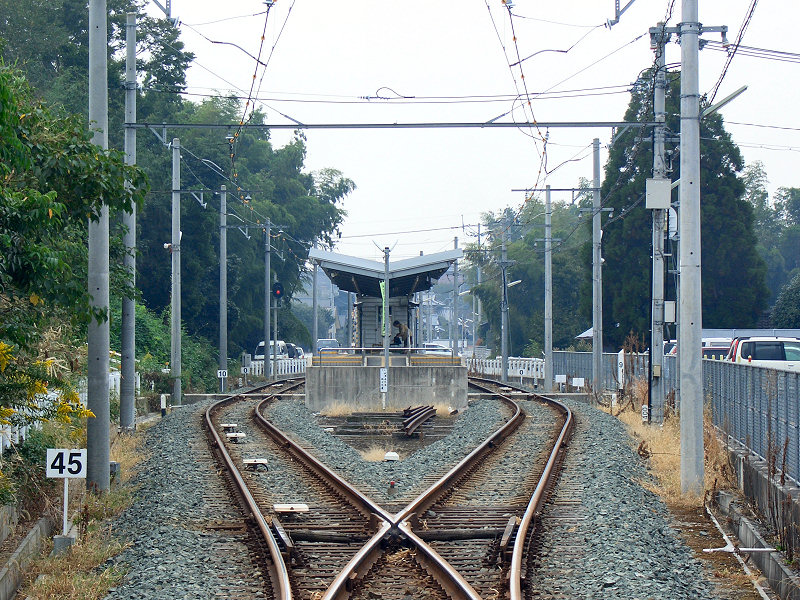
- Kuroishi Station platform

General information
- Location: Suya, Kōshi-shi, Kumamoto-ken 861-1102; Japan
- Coordinates: 32.8704°N 130.7421°E
- Operator: Kumamoto Electric Railway
- Line: ■ Kikuchi Line
- Distance: 9.0 km from Kami-Kumamoto
- Platforms: 1 island platform

Other information
- Station code: KD16

History
- Opened: 27 August 1913

Passengers
- FY2020: 794

Services
Preceding station	Kumamoto Electric Railway	Following station
Mitsuishi towards Kami-Kumamoto	Kikuchi Line	Kumamotokōsen-mae towards Miyoshi
Location
- Location within Kumamoto Prefecture Location within Japan

Kuroishi Station (黒石駅, Kuroishi-eki) is a passenger railway station located in the city of Kōshi, Kumamoto Prefecture, Japan. It is operated by the private transportation company Kumamoto Electric Railway.

== Lines ==
The station is served by the Kikuchi Line and is located 9 km from the starting point of the line at Kami-Kumamoto.Only local trains serve the station

== Layout ==
Kuroishi Station is a ground-level station with one island platform with a level crossing. There is no station building and the station is unattended. One of the Kikuchi Line's two passing loops is located here.

=== Platforms ===
1	■ ■ Kikuchi Line	for Miyoshi
2	■ ■ Kikuchi Line	for Kita-Kumamoto and Kami-Kumamoto

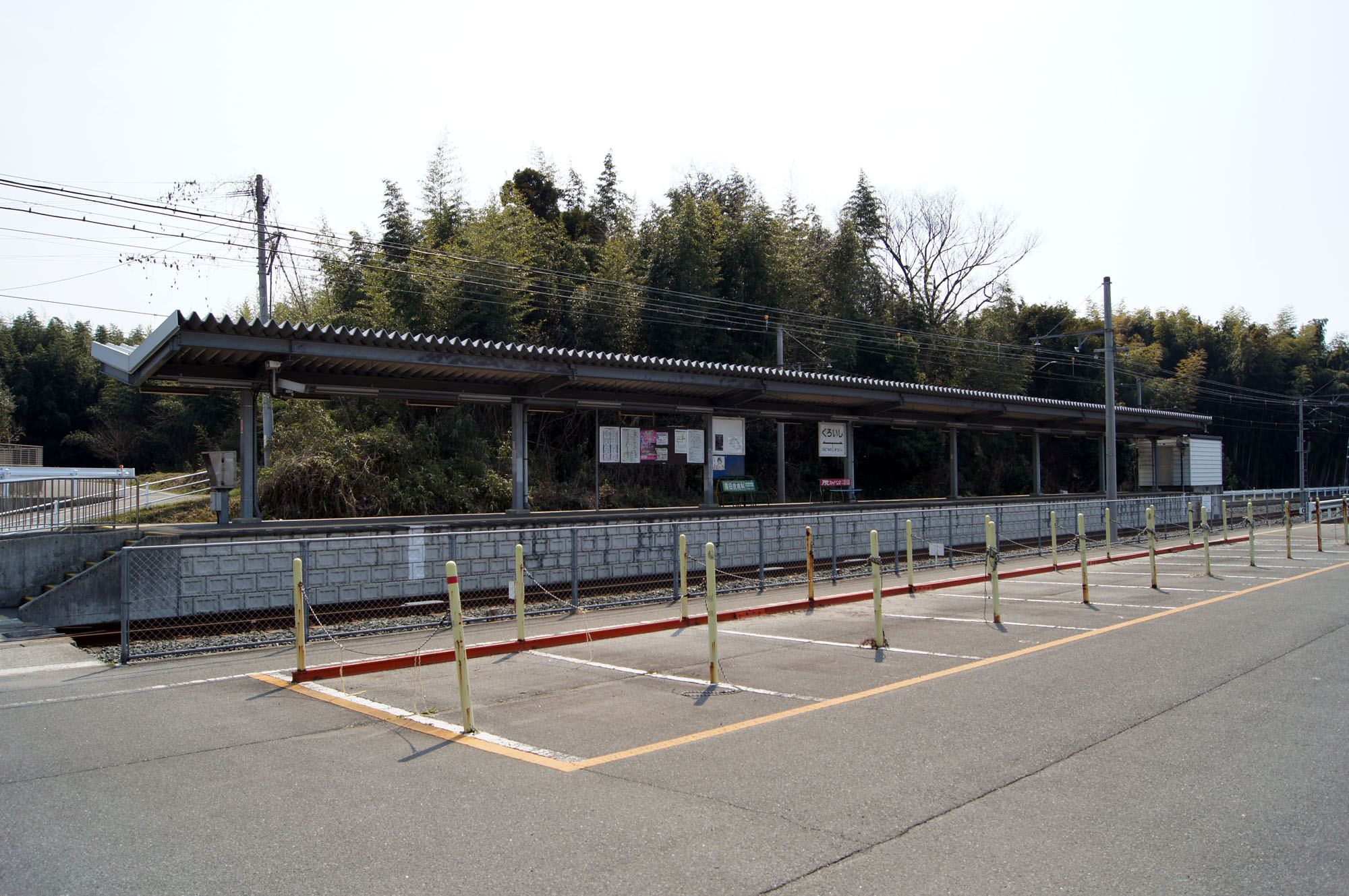
West view

== History ==
The station was opened on 26 August 1913.

== Passenger statistics ==
In fiscal 2020, the station was used by an average of 794 passengers daily.

== Surrounding area ==
- Kumamoto Employment Support Agency
- Kuroishi Housing Complex
- Koshi City Nishigoshi Minami Junior High School
- Koshi City Nishigoshi Higashi Elementary School

== See also ==
- List of railway stations in Japan
