= Saishun Iryō Center Mae Station =

Railway station located in Kōshi, Kumamoto

Saishun Iryō Center Mae Station 再春医療センター前駅
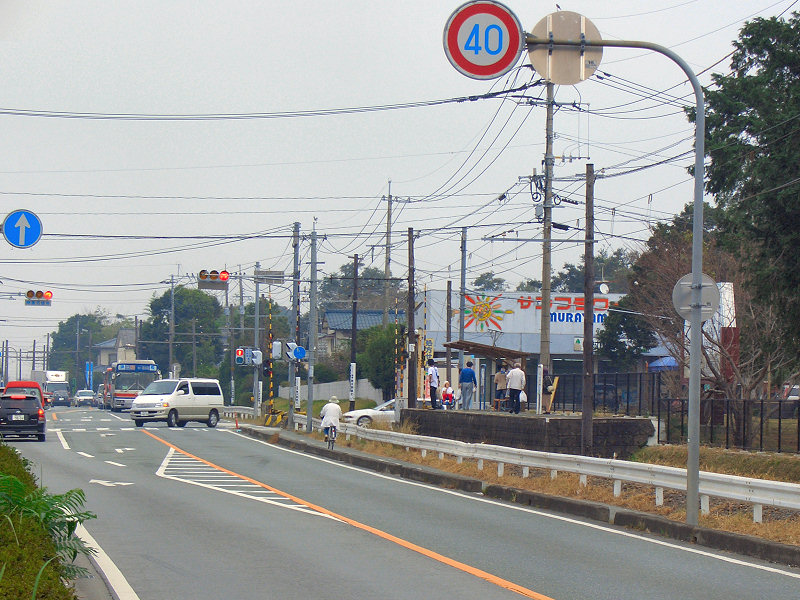
- Station platform

General information
- Location: Suya, Kōshi-shi, Kumamoto-ken 861-1102; Japan
- Coordinates: 32.8810°N 130.7480°E
- Operator: Kumamoto Electric Railway
- Line: ■ Kikuchi Line
- Distance: 10.2 km from Kami-Kumamoto
- Platforms: 1 side platform

Other information
- Station code: KD18

History
- Opened: 16 October 1965
- Former names: Saishunsō-mae (until 2019)

Passengers
- FY2018: 125

Services
Preceding station	Kumamoto Electric Railway	Following station
Kumamotokōsen-mae towards Kami-Kumamoto	Kikuchi Line	Miyoshi Terminus
Location
- Location within Kumamoto Prefecture Location within Japan

Saishun Iryō Center Mae Station (再春医療センター前駅, Saishun Iryōsentā mae eki) is a train station in Kōshi, Kumamoto Prefecture, Japan. is a passenger railway station located in the city of Kōshi, Kumamoto Prefecture, Japan. It is operated by the private transportation company Kumamoto Electric Railway.

== Layout ==
Saishun Iryō Center Mae Station is a ground-level station with one side platform. There is no station building and the station is unattended.

== Lines ==
The station is served by the Kikuchi Line and is located 10.2 bsp;km from the starting point of the line at Kami-Kumamoto.Only local trains serve the station

== History ==
The station was opened on 16 October 1965 as Saishunsō-mae Station (再春荘前駅). On 1 October 2019 with the name change of Kumamoto Saishunsō Hospital to Kumamoto Saishun Medical Center, the station was renamed Saishun Medical Center-mae Station.r. On 10 October 2022 with the land readjustment project in the Miyashi district of Koshi City, the Kikuchi Line tracks and this station were relocated eastward to the grounds of Kumamoto Saishun Medical Center.

== Passenger statistics ==
In fiscal 2018, the station was used by an average of 125 passengers daily.

== Surrounding area ==
- Kumamoto Saishun Medical Center
- National Sanatorium Kikuchi Keifuen
- Kumamoto National College of Technology Kumamoto Campus

== See also ==
- List of railway stations in Japan
