= Mitsuishi Station =

Mitsuishi Station may refer to:

- Mitsuishi Station (Okayama), a railway station in Okayama Prefecture, Japan
- Mitsuishi Station (Kumamoto), a railway station in Kumamoto Prefecture, Japan
