= Miyoshi Station =

Miyoshi Station is the name of two train stations in Japan:

- Miyoshi Station (Hiroshima) (三次駅)
- Miyoshi Station (Kumamoto) (御代志駅)
