= Kōshi, Kumamoto =

Kōshi 合志市
- City
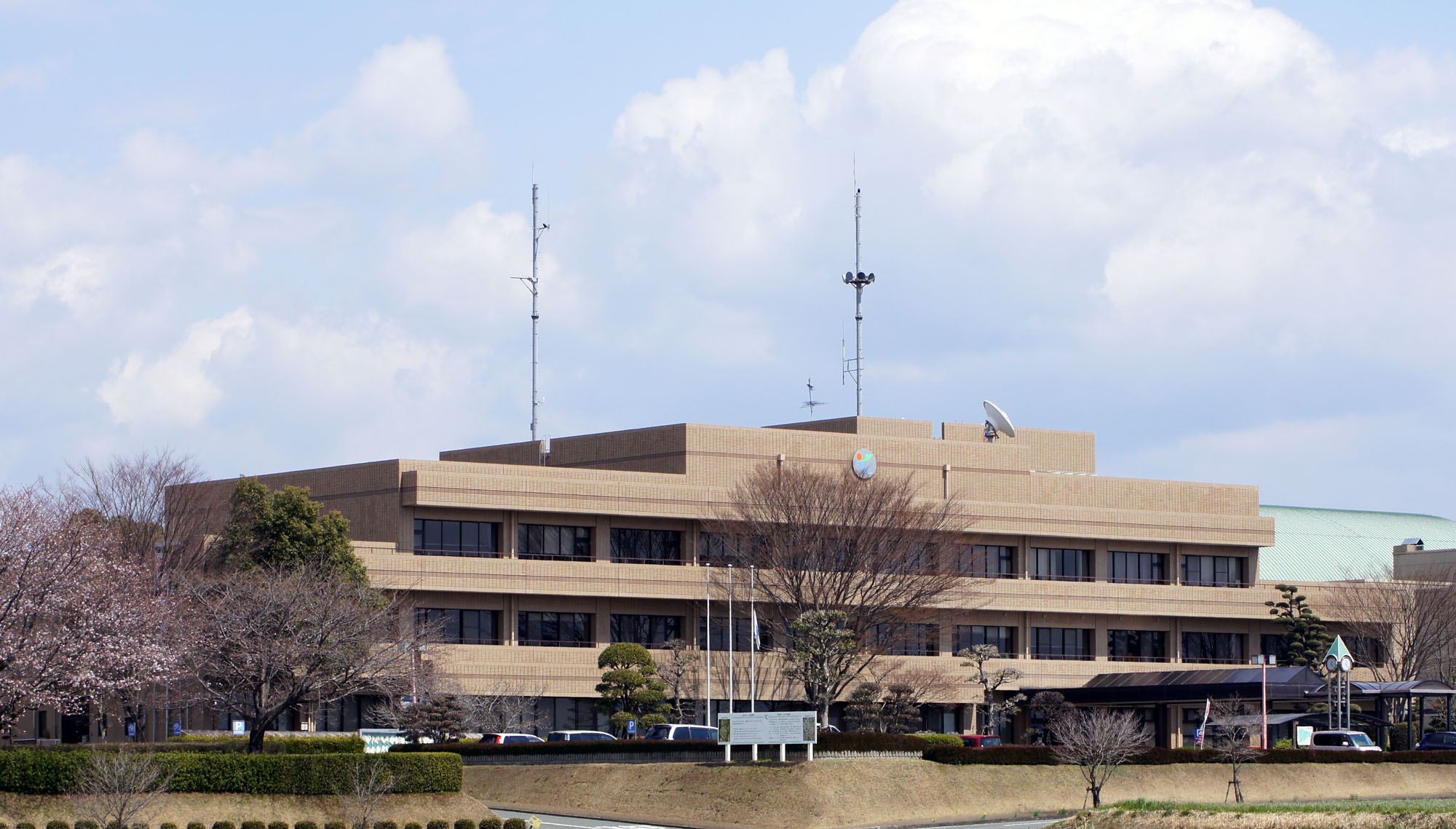
- Koshi City Hall

- Flag Emblem
- Interactive map of Kōshi
- Location in Japan
- Coordinates: 32°53′09″N 130°47′23″E
- Country: Japan
- Region: Kyushu
- Prefecture: Kumamoto

Government
  - Mayor: Yoshiyuki Araki (since April 2010)

Area
  - Total: 53.19 km^{2} (20.54 sq mi)

Population (July 31, 2024)
  - Total: 65,054
  - Density: 1,223/km^{2} (3,168/sq mi)
- Time zone: UTC+09:00 (JST)
- City hall address: 2140 Takesako, Koshi-shi, Kumamoto-ken, 861-1195
- Website: Official website
- Symbols
- Flower: Gypsophila
- Tree: Quercus acutissima

Kōshi (合志市, Kōshi-shi) is a city in Kumamoto Prefecture, Japan. As of 31 July 2024, the city had an estimated population of 65,054 in 26670 households, and a population density of 860 persons per km^{2}. The total area of the city is 53.19 km^{2} (20.54 sq mi)..

== Geography ==
Kōshi is located in a northern inland part of Kumamoto Prefecture. The northern part of the city is one of the prefecture's leading grain-producing areas, with soils consisting of volcanic ash humus called "Kuroboku", which is the result of volcanic ash falling from Mount Aso. Residential and commercial areas are located along national and prefectural roads and the Kumamoto Electric Railway. A new urban area has also formed in the southwestern area adjacent to Kumamoto City, and the population is on the rise as a commuter town for Kumamoto City.

=== Neighboring municipalities ===
Kumamoto Prefecture

- Kikuchi
- Kikuyō
- Kumamoto
- Ōzu

=== Climate ===
Kōshi has a humid subtropical climate (Köppen Cfa) characterized by warm summers and cool winters with light to no snowfall. The average annual temperature in Kōshi is 15.3 °C. The average annual rainfall is 1988 mm with September as the wettest month. The temperatures are highest on average in August, at around 26.1 °C, and lowest in January, at around 4.6 °C.

=== Demographics ===
Per Japanese census data, the population of Kōshi is as shown below

Historical population
Year	Pop.	±%
1940	13,036	—
1950	19,071	+46.3%
1960	19,200	+0.7%
1970	19,651	+2.3%
1980	31,856	+62.1%
1990	42,014	+31.9%
2000	49,391	+17.6%
2010	55,002	+11.4%
2020	61,772	+12.3%

== History ==
The area of Kōshi was part of ancient Higo Province, During the Edo Period it was part of the holdings of Kumamoto Domain. After the Meiji restoration, the villages of Kōshi and Nishikōshi was established with the creation of the modern municipalities system on April 1, 1889. Kōshi was raised to town status on April 1, 1966 and Nishikōshi on October 1, 1966. On February 27, 2006 Kōshi and Nishikōshi merged to form the city of Kōshi. It was the 14th "Great Heisei Merger" in Kumamoto Prefecture.

== Government ==
Kōshi has a mayor-council form of government with a directly elected mayor and a unicameral city council of 19 members. Kōshi contributes two members to the Kumamoto Prefectural Assembly. In terms of national politics, the city is part of the Kumamoto 3rd district of the lower house of the Diet of Japan.

== Economy ==
Kōshi has amixed economy based on manufacturing of automotive parts and precision equipment, as well as agriculture

== Education ==
Kōshi has eight public elementary schools and four public junior high schools operated by the city government. The city does not have a high school. However, the Kumamoto Prefectural Board of Education operates three schools for the handicapped.

== Transportation ==
=== Railways ===
Kumamoto Electric Railway - Kikuchi Line

- Shin-Suya - Suya - Mitsuishi - Kuroishi - Kumamotokōsen-mae - Saishun Iryō Center Mae - Miyoshi

=== Highways ===
- National Route 3
- National Route 387

== Notable people ==
- Yudai Nakashima (1984–), football player
- Masato Uchishiba (1978–), Olympic judo wrestler
- Kyosuke Usuta (1974–), manga artist
