= Kita-Kumamoto Station =

Railway station located in Kumamoto City, Kumamoto

Kita-Kumamoto Station 北熊本駅
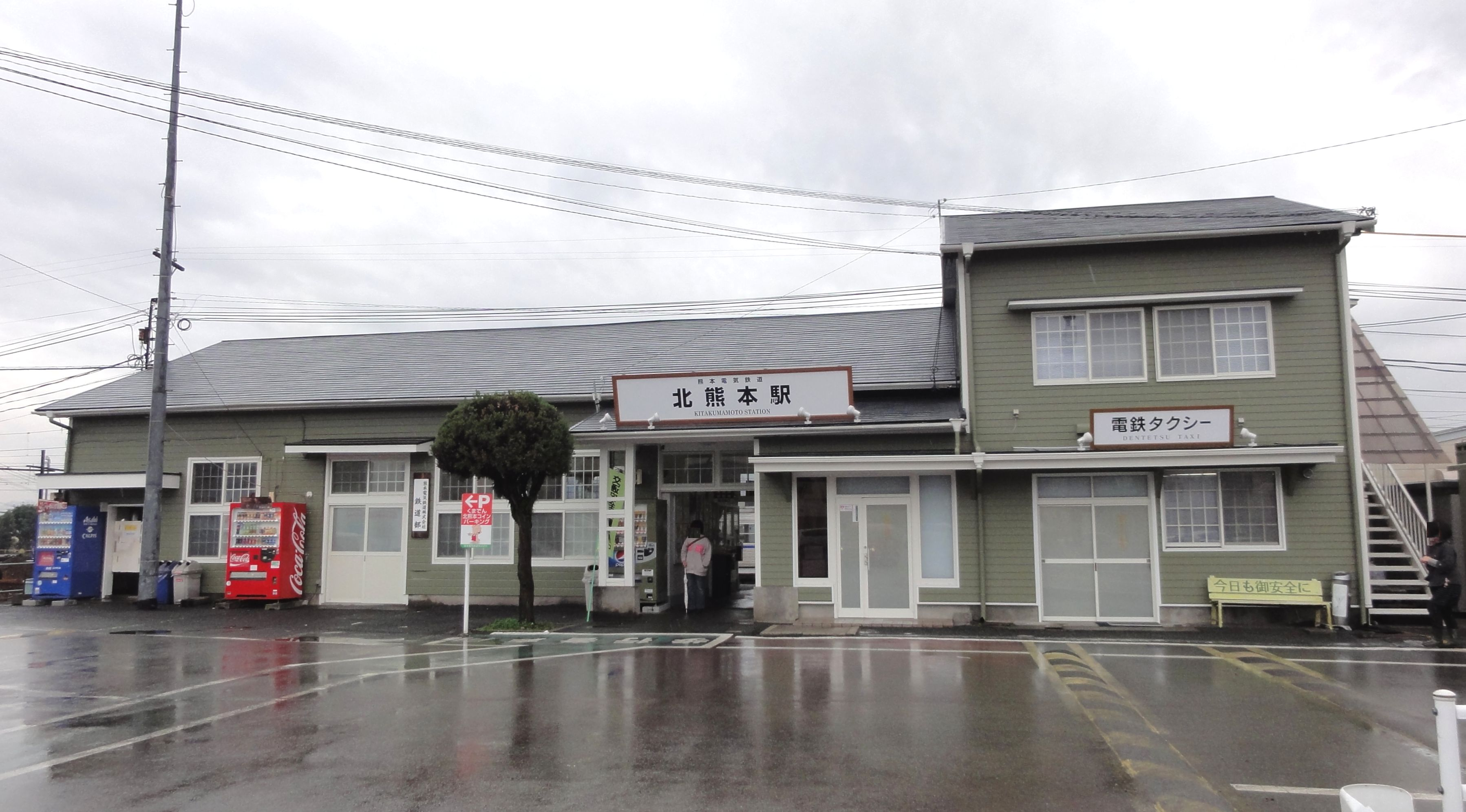
- Kita-Kumamoto Station entrance

General information
- Location: 1 Murozonomachi, Kita-ku, Kumamoto-shi, Kumamoto-ken, 861-8072; Japan
- Coordinates: 32.8276°N 130.7220°E
- Operator: Kumamoto Electric Railway
- Line: ■ Kikuchi Line ■ Fujisaki Line
- Distance: 3.4 km from Kami-Kumamoto
- Platforms: 1 side + 1 island platform

Other information
- Station code: KD08

History
- Opened: 1 April 1949

Services
| Preceding station | Kumamoto Electric Railway | Following station |
|---|---|---|
| Tsuboigawa-kōen towards Kami-Kumamoto | Kikuchi Line | Terminus |
| through to Fujisaki Line | Kikuchi Line | Kamei towards Miyoshi |
| Kurokamimachi towards Fujisakigū-mae | Fujisaki Line | through to Kikuchi Line |
Location
- Location within Kumamoto Prefecture Location within Japan

Kita-Kumamoto Station (北熊本駅, Kita-Kumamoto-eki) is a junction passenger railway station located in the Kita-ku ward of the city of Kumamoto, Kumamoto Prefecture, Japan. It is operated by the private transportation company Kumamoto Electric Railway.

== Lines ==
The station is served by the Kikuchi Line and is located 3.4 bsp;km from the starting point of the line at Kami-Kumamoto. It is also a terminus of the 2.3 kilometer Fujisaki Line to Fujisakigū-mae Station.Only local trains serve the station

== Layout ==
Kita-Kumamoto is an above-ground station with one side platform and one island platform connected by a level crossing (for a total of two platforms and three tracks), as well as several sidings and a maintenance shed (car depot).

=== Platforms ===
| 1 | ■ ■ Fujisaki Line | for Kurokamimachi and Fujisakigū-mae |
| 2 | ■ ■ Kikuchi Line | for Horikawa and Miyoshi |
| 2 | ■ ■ Kikuchi Line | for Kami-Kumamoto |

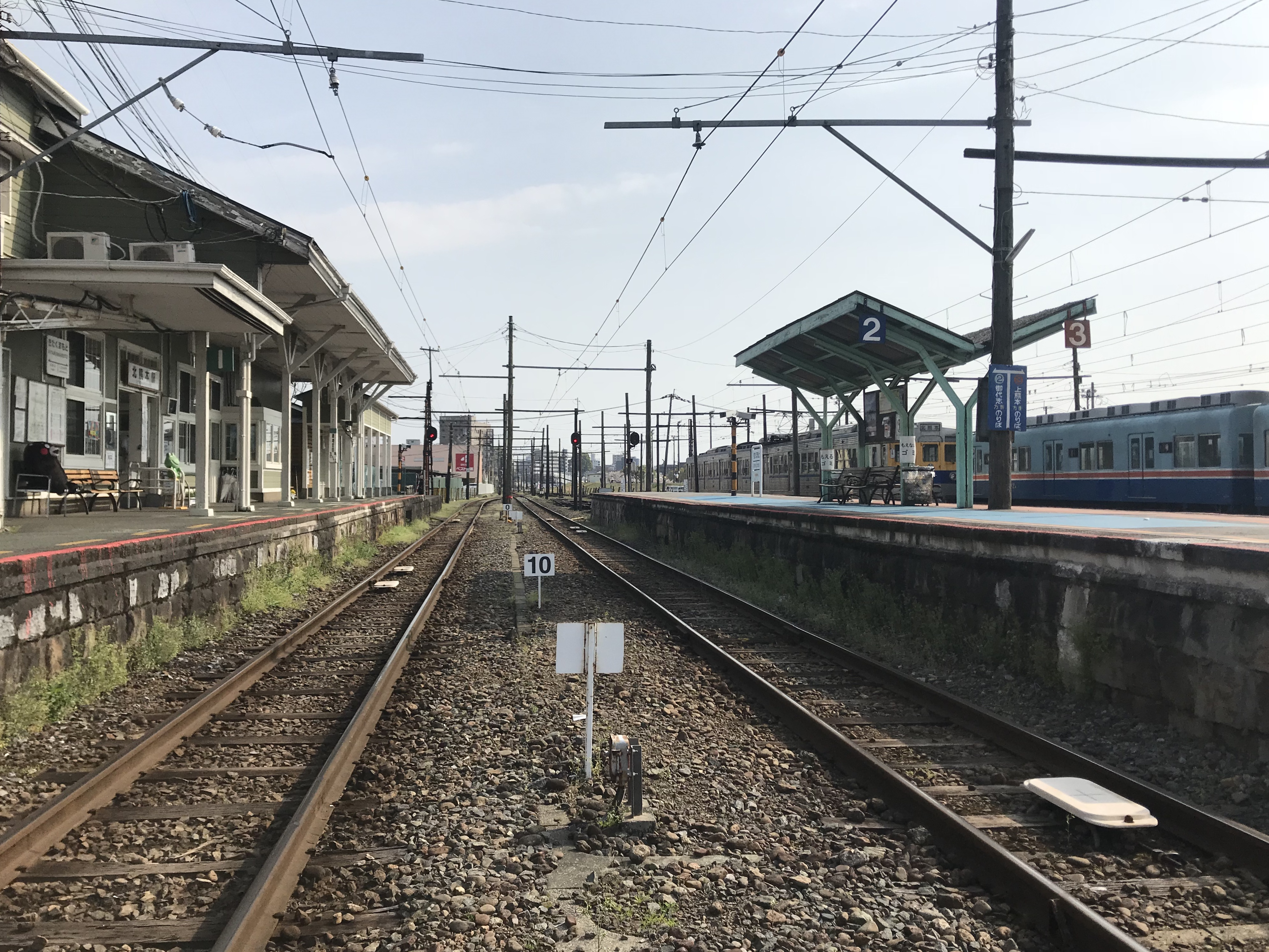
View of platforms from level crossing

== History ==
The station was opened on 1 April 1949.

== Passenger statistics ==
In fiscal 2018 the station was used by an average of 1017 passengers daily.

== Surrounding area ==
- Japan National Route 3
- Asahino General Hospital
- Kumamoto City Shimizu Elementary School

== See also ==
- List of railway stations in Japan
