= Ikeda Station =

Ikeda Station is the name of four train stations in Japan:

- Ikeda Station (Hokkaidō) in Ikeda, Hokkaidō on the JR Nemuro Main Line
- Ikeda Station (Osaka) in Ikeda, Osaka on the Hankyū Takarazuka Main Line
- Ikeda Station (Kumamoto) in Kumamoto, Kumamoto on the Kumamoto Dentetsu Kikuchi Line
- Awa-Ikeda Station in Miyoshi, Tokushima on the JR Dosan Line
