= Kikuchi line =

Kikuchi line may refer to:

- Kikuchi lines (physics), bands seen on crystals in electron diffraction
- Kikuchi Line (railway), a railway line in Kumamoto Prefecture connecting Kami-Kumamoto Station to Miyoshi Station
