= Kuroishi Station =

Kuroishi Station is the name of two train stations in Japan.

- Kuroishi Station (Aomori) in Kuroishi, Aomori Prefecture
- Kuroishi Station (Kumamoto) in Kōshi, Kumamoto Prefecture
