= Japan National Route 387 =

National highway in Japan

National Route 387
- 国道387号
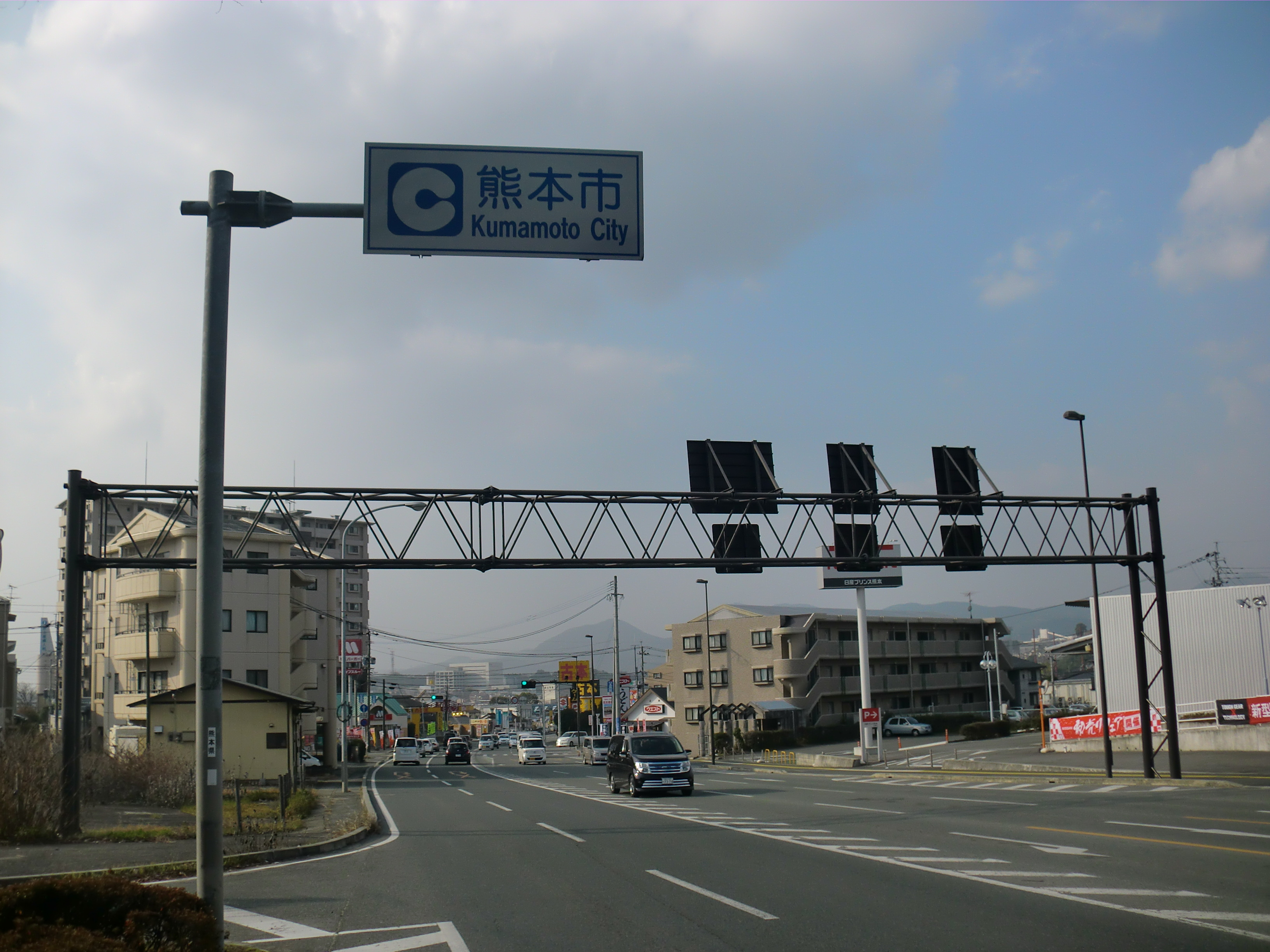

Route information
- Length: 132.6 km (82.4 mi)

Location
- Country: Japan

Highway system
- National highways of Japan; Expressways of Japan
← National Route 386	→ National Route 388

National Route 387 is a national highway of Japan connecting Usa, Ōita and Kita-ku, Kumamoto in Japan, with a total length of 132.6 km (82.39 mi).
