= Kumamoto City Transportation Bureau =

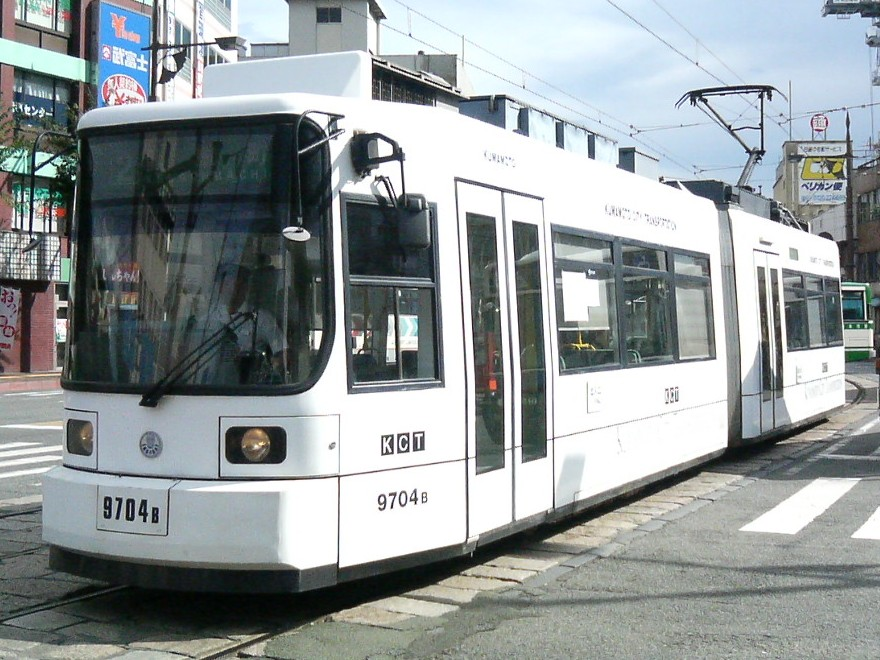
- Type 9700 light rail vehicle

Overview
- Native name: 熊本市交通局
- Owner: Kumamoto City
- Transit type: Light rail
- Number of lines: 2
- Headquarters: 5-chome-1-40 Oe, Chuo-ku; Kumamoto-shi, Kumamoto-ken; 862-0971
- Website: http://www.kotsu-kumamoto.jp/

Operation
- Began operation: 16 November 1921

Technical
- Track gauge: 1,435 mm (4 ft 8 1/2 in) standard gauge
System Map
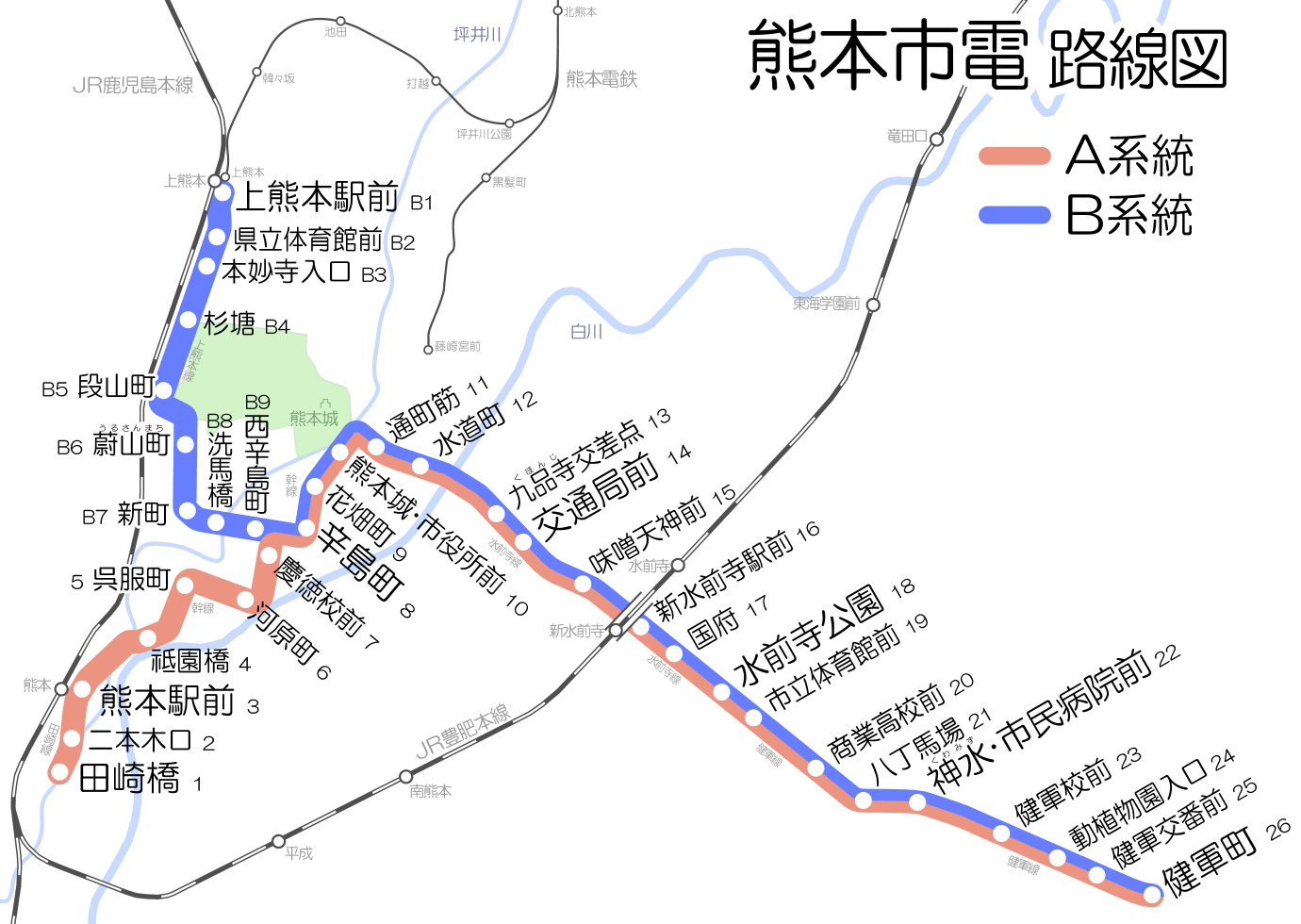

The Kumamoto City Transportation Bureau (熊本市交通局, Kumamoto-shi Kōtsūkyoku) is a public transportation authority of Kumamoto City, Japan.

== Tram Routes ==
The bureau operates 2 tram lines within the city.

== History ==
=== Timeline ===
- 23 November 2024 - The 2400 series train has entered service.

== Tram Fare ==
The fare is a flat 180 yen for adults, 90 yen for children, payable by cash or public transit card (including Nimoca, ICOCA, Suica, and Pasmo).

== Operators ==
Bus lines in the city were formerly operated by the agency, but have since been privatized.

The city government has operated tram lines since 1924, and bus lines since 1927, but the current transportation bureau was formed in 1944.

== Kumamoto City Tram ==
Currently, Kumamoto City Tram (熊本市電, Kumamoto Shiden) has five lines in official count, but with only two routes regularly in service.

=== Lines and routes ===
- Lines:
  - Trunk Line (幹線): Kumamoto-Ekimae — Suidōchō
  - Suizenji Line (水前寺線): Suidōchō — Suizenji-Kōen
  - Kengun Line (健軍線): Suizenji-Kōen — Kengunmachi
  - Kami-Kumamoto Line (上熊本線): Karashimachō — Kami-Kumamoto
  - Tasaki Line (田崎線): Kumamoto-Ekimae — Tasakibashi
- Routes:
  - Route A (A系統): Tasakibashi — Kumamoto-Ekimae — Karashimachō — Suidōchō — Suizenji-Kōen — Kengunmachi
  - Route B (B系統): Kami-Kumamoto — Karashimachō — Suidōchō — Suizenji-Kōen — Kengunmachi

== Gallery ==
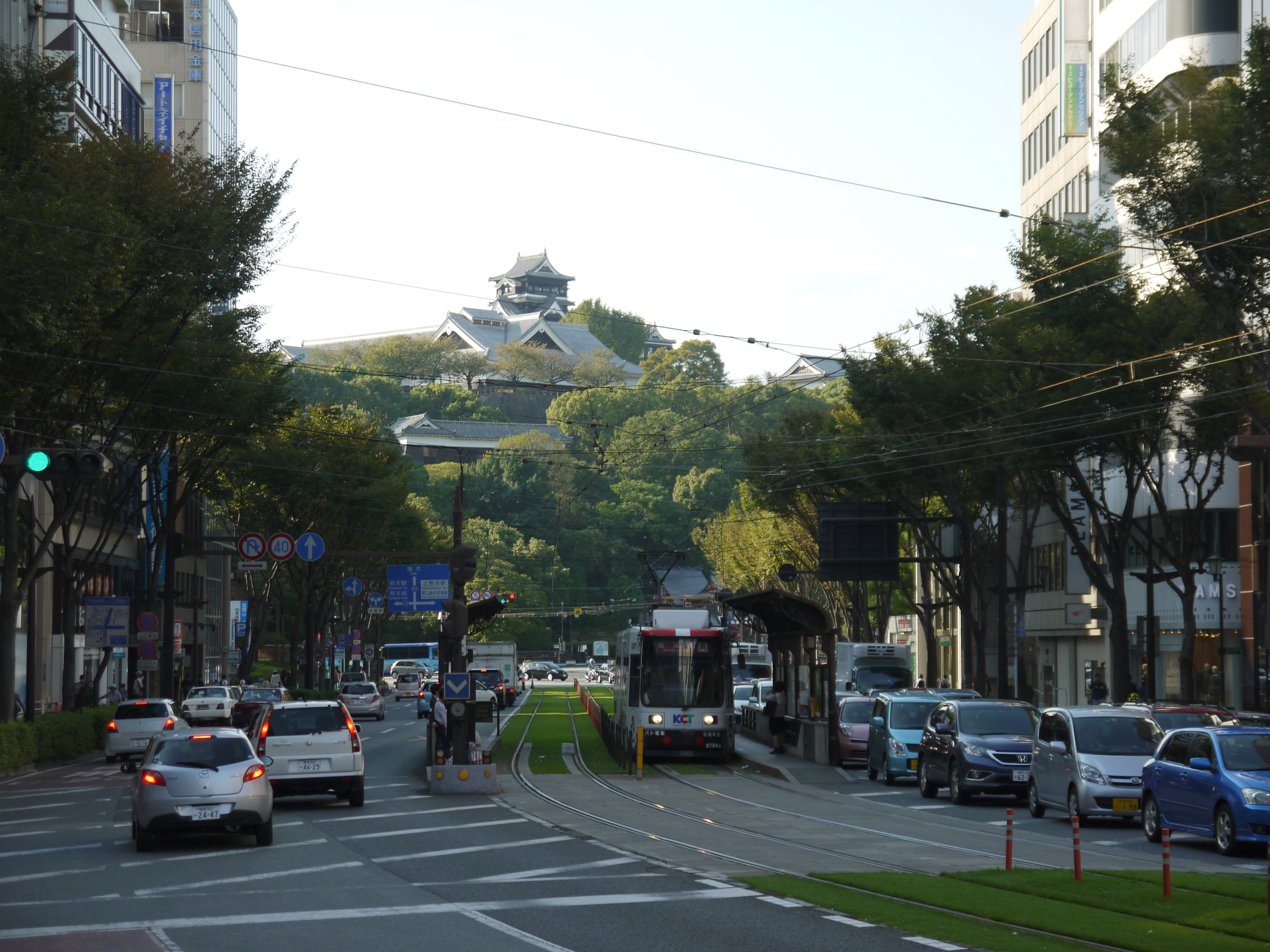
Kumamoto City Tram

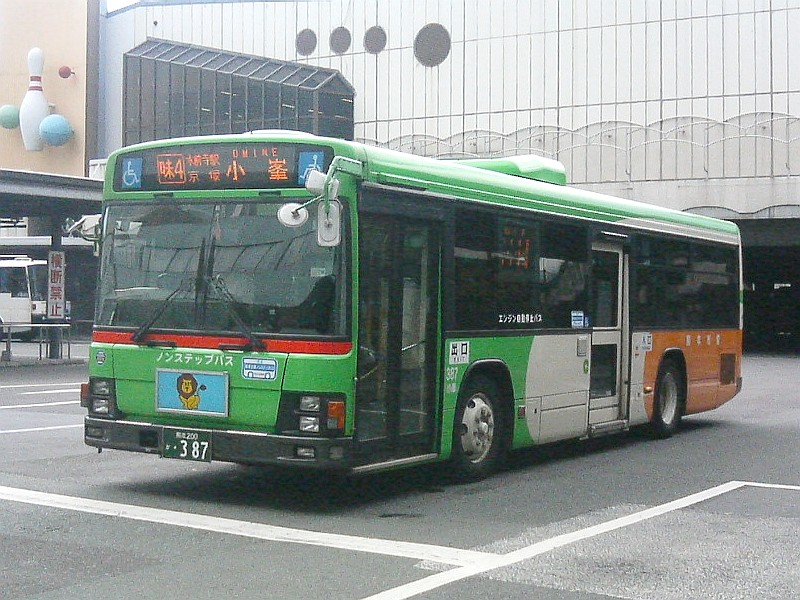
Kumamoto Buses

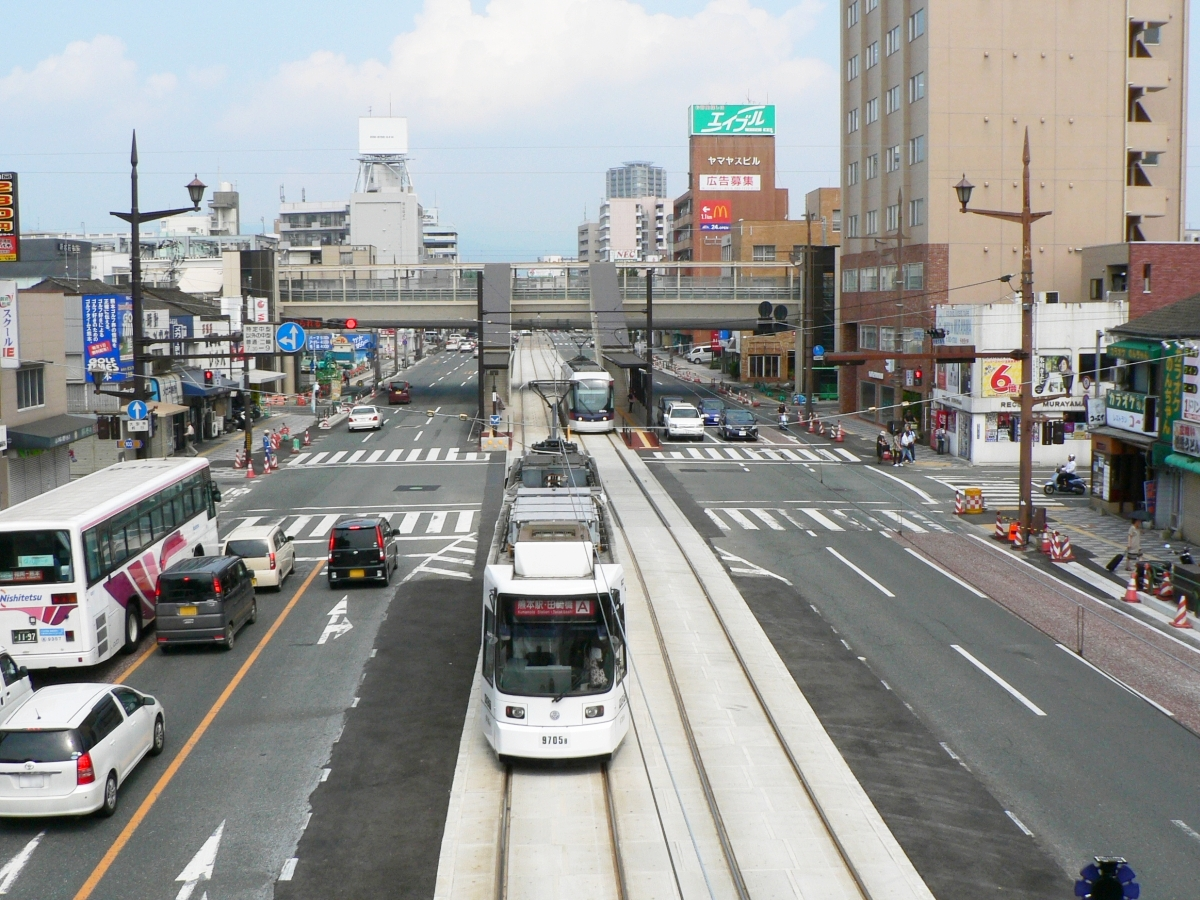
Route A at Shin-Suizenji Station

== See also ==
- List of light-rail transit systems
