= Kita-ku, Kumamoto =

Ward of Kumamoto City in Kyūshū, Japan

Coordinates: 32°54′13″N 130°41′40″E

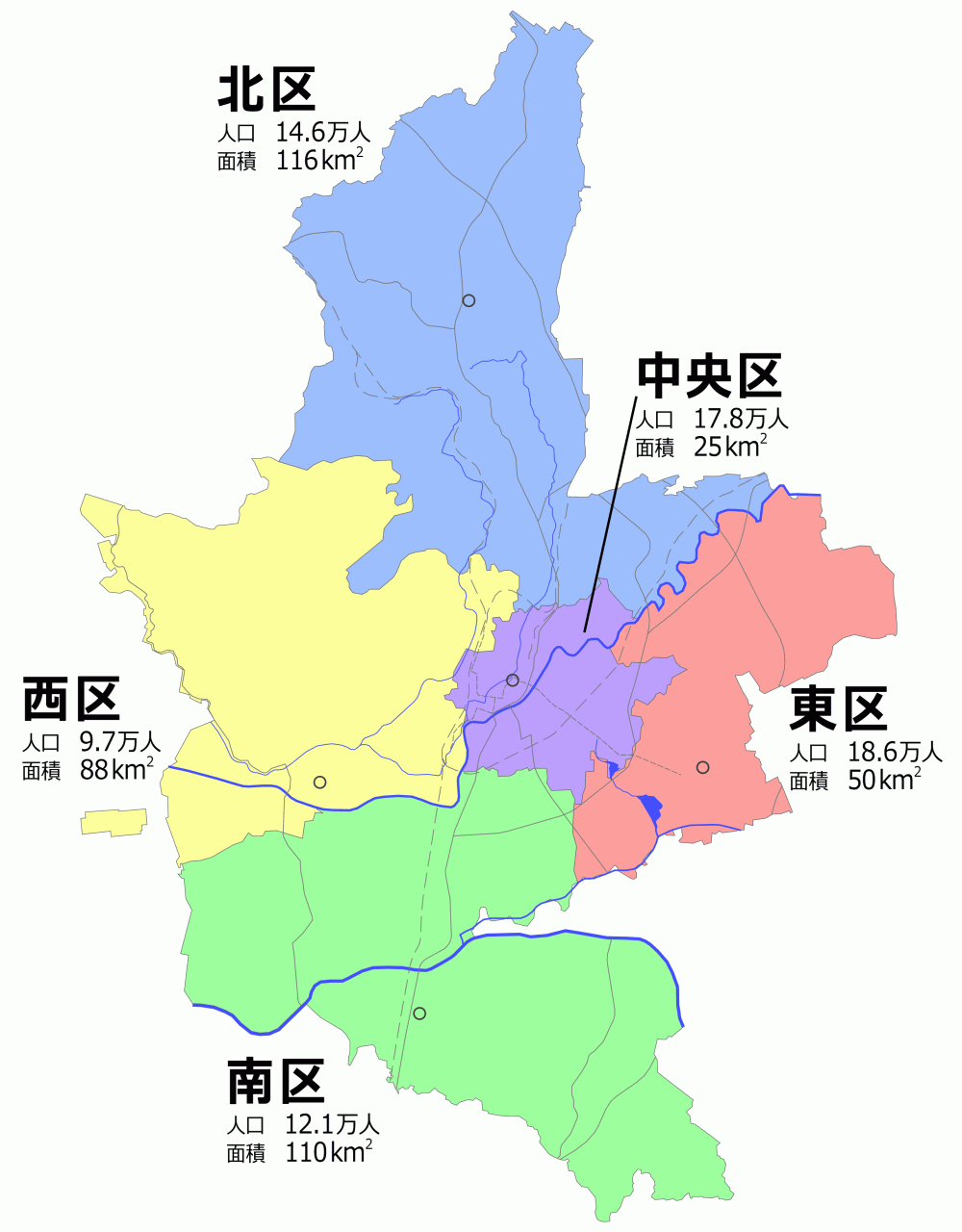
Map of Kumamoto's Wards

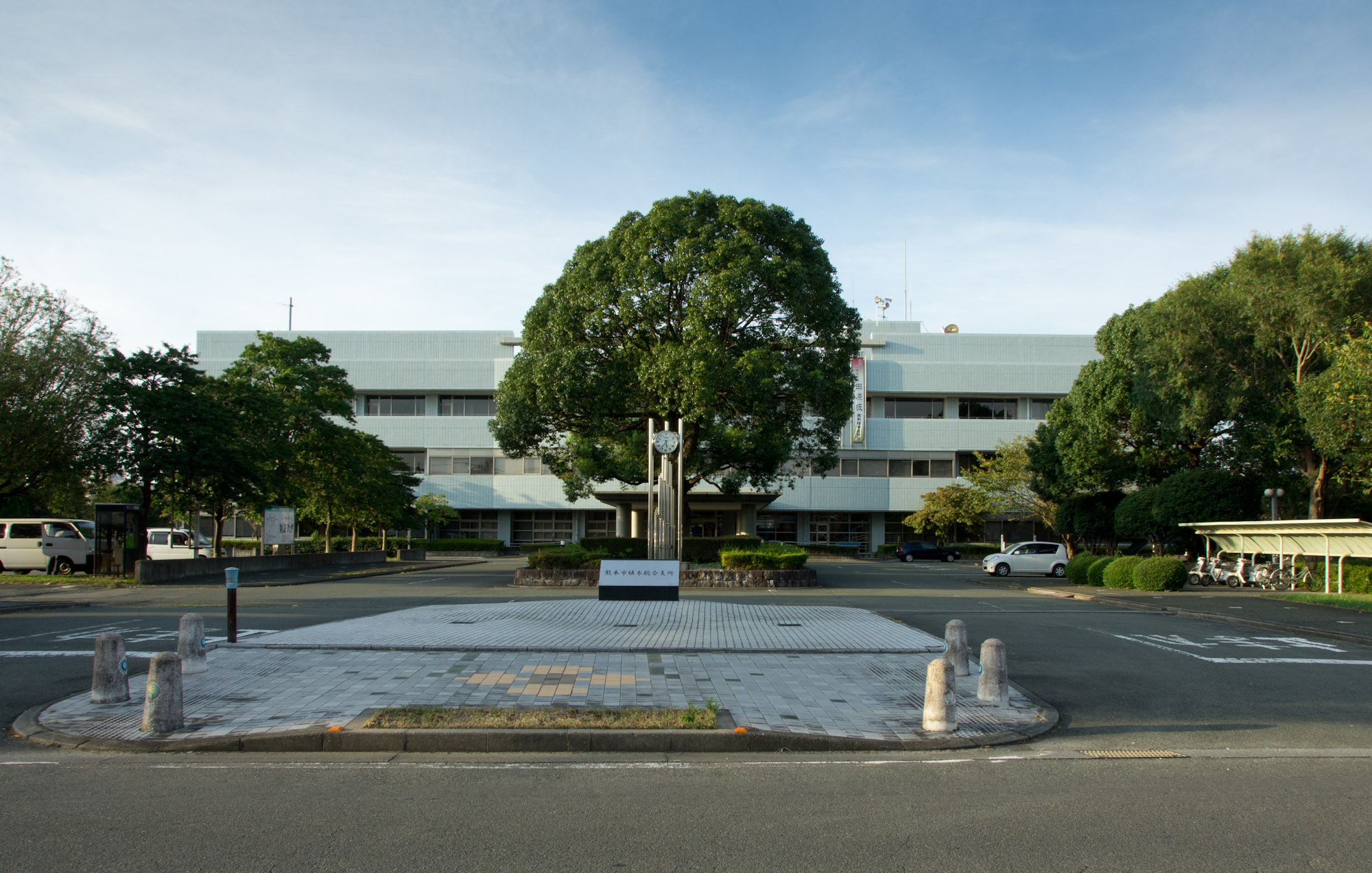
Kita ward office

Kita-ku (北区) is one of the five wards of Kumamoto City, Japan. Meaning literally "north ward," it is bordered by the Nishi-ku, Chūō-ku, Higashi-ku and also by the cities of Yamaga, Kikuchi, Kōshi and the towns of Gyokutō and Kikuyō. As of 2020, it has a population of 139,833 people and an area of 115.65 km^{2}.
