= Miyoshi Station (Kumamoto) =

Railway station located in Kōshi, Kumamoto

Miyoshi Station 御代志駅
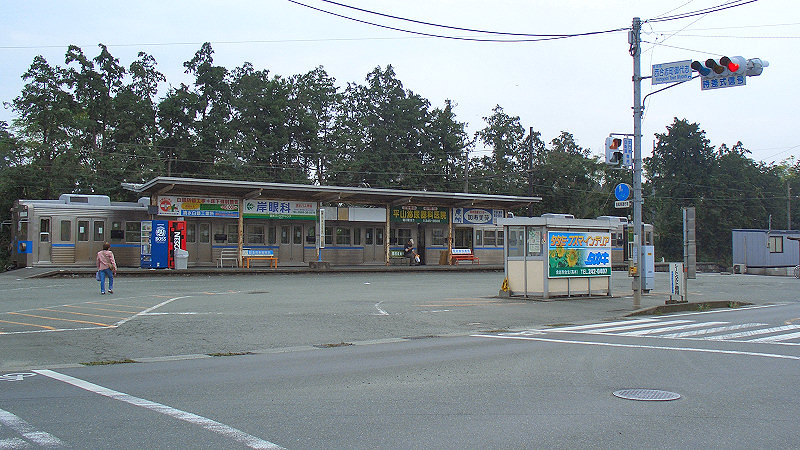
- Miyoshi Station platform

General information
- Location: Miyoshi, Kōshi-shi, Kumamoto-ken 861-1104; Japan
- Coordinates: 32°53′06″N 130°45′01″E
- Operator: Kumamoto Electric Railway
- Line: ■ Kikuchi Line
- Distance: 10.6 km from Kami-Kumamoto
- Platforms: 1 side platform

Other information
- Station code: KD19

History
- Opened: 27 August 1913

Passengers
- FY2018: 885

Services
| Preceding station | Kumamoto Electric Railway | Following station |
|---|---|---|
| Saishun Iryō Center Mae towards Kami-Kumamoto | Kikuchi Line | Terminus |
Location
- Location within Kumamoto Prefecture Location within Japan

Miyoshi Station (御代志駅, Miyoshi-eki) is a passenger railway station located in the city of Kōshi, Kumamoto Prefecture, Japan. It is operated by the private transportation company Kumamoto Electric Railway.

== Layout ==
Miyoshi Station is a ground-level station with one dead-headed side platform. The station is staffed

== Lines ==
The station is the terminus of the Kikuchi Line and is located 10.6 bsp;km from the opposing terminus of the line at Kami-Kumamoto.Only local trains serve the station

== History ==
The station was opened on 27 August 1913. On 1 October 1959 it was relocated to its present location. The shutdown of the section of track from this station to Kikuchi Station resulted in Miyoshi Station becoming the terminal station of the Kikuchi Line.

== Passenger statistics ==
In fiscal 2018, the station was used by an average of 885 passengers daily.

== Surrounding area ==
- Koshi City Hall Nishigoshi Building (former Nishigoshi Town Hall)
- Koshi City Nishigoshi Library
- Koshi City Nishigoshi Local History Museum

== See also ==
- List of railway stations in Japan
