= Kumamoto Electric Railway =

Railway and bus company in Fukuoka, Japan

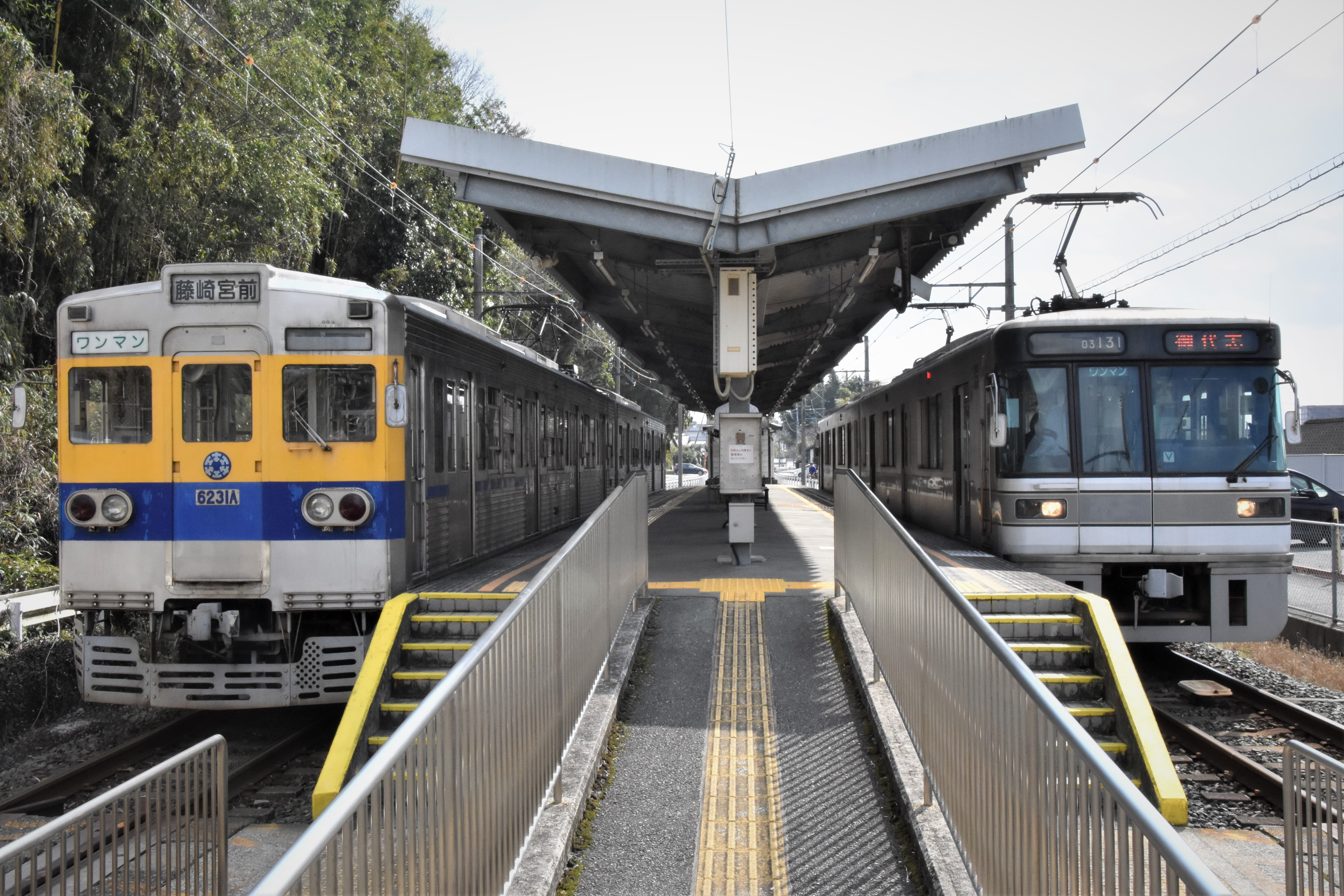
- A 6000 series and 03 series train

Overview
- Status: Operational
- Owner: Kumamoto Electric Railway
- Locale: Kumamoto Prefecture

History
- Opened: 15 August 1909

Technical
- Line length: 13.1 km (8.1 mi)
- Track gauge: 1,067 mm (3 ft 6 in)
- Electrification: 600 V DC overhead catenary
- Operating speed: 50 km/h (30 mph)

The Kumamoto Electric Railway (熊本電気鉄道, Kumamoto Denki Tetsudō) is a public transport company in Kumamoto Prefecture, Japan. It is abbreviated as Kumamoto Dentetsu (熊本電鉄) or Kumaden (熊電). The company was founded in 1909. The company operates railway and bus lines.

== Railway lines ==
- Kikuchi Line (菊池線)
  - Kami-Kumamoto — Kita-Kumamoto — Miyoshi: 10.8 km (6.7 mi)
- Fujisaki Line (藤崎線)
  - Kita-Kumamoto — Fujisakigū-mae: 2.3 km (1.4 mi)

A short section of the Fujisaki Line shares its track with public road.

== Routes and services ==
Train services operate on two routes:

- Kami-Kumamoto — Kita-Kumamoto (a portion of the Kikuchi Line)
- Miyoshi — Kita-Kumamoto — Fujisakigū-mae (the remaining portion of the Kikuchi Line combined with the Fujisaki Line)

Services from the 3 termini (Kami-Kumamoto, Miyoshi and Fujisakigū-mae) meet at Kita-Kumamoto at the same times allowing seamless transfer between services.

From 3 February 2025, Kumamoto Electric Railway implemented service reductions due to chronic driver shortages. Kami-Kumamoto – Kita-Kumamoto services will operate every 40 minutes (previously every 30 minutes), and Miyoshi – Kita-Kumamoto – Fujisakigū-mae services will operate every 20 minutes during morning & evening peak hours (previously every 15 minutes) and every 40 minutes at other times (previously every 30 minutes).

At Kami-Kumamoto, passengers can transfer to JR Kyushu Kagoshima Line trains and Kumamoto City Transportation Bureau tram (streetcar) Route B.

== Rolling stock ==
All trains are 2-car sets acquired second-hand from other operators.

=== Current ===
- 1000 series EMUs (former Shizuoka Railway 1000 series), since March 2022
- 03 series EMUs (former Tokyo Metro 03 series), 3 x 2-car sets, since April 2019
- 01 series EMUs (former Tokyo Metro 01 series), 2 x 2-car sets, since March 2015
- 6000 series EMUs (former Toei 6000 series), 5 x 2-car sets, since 1995
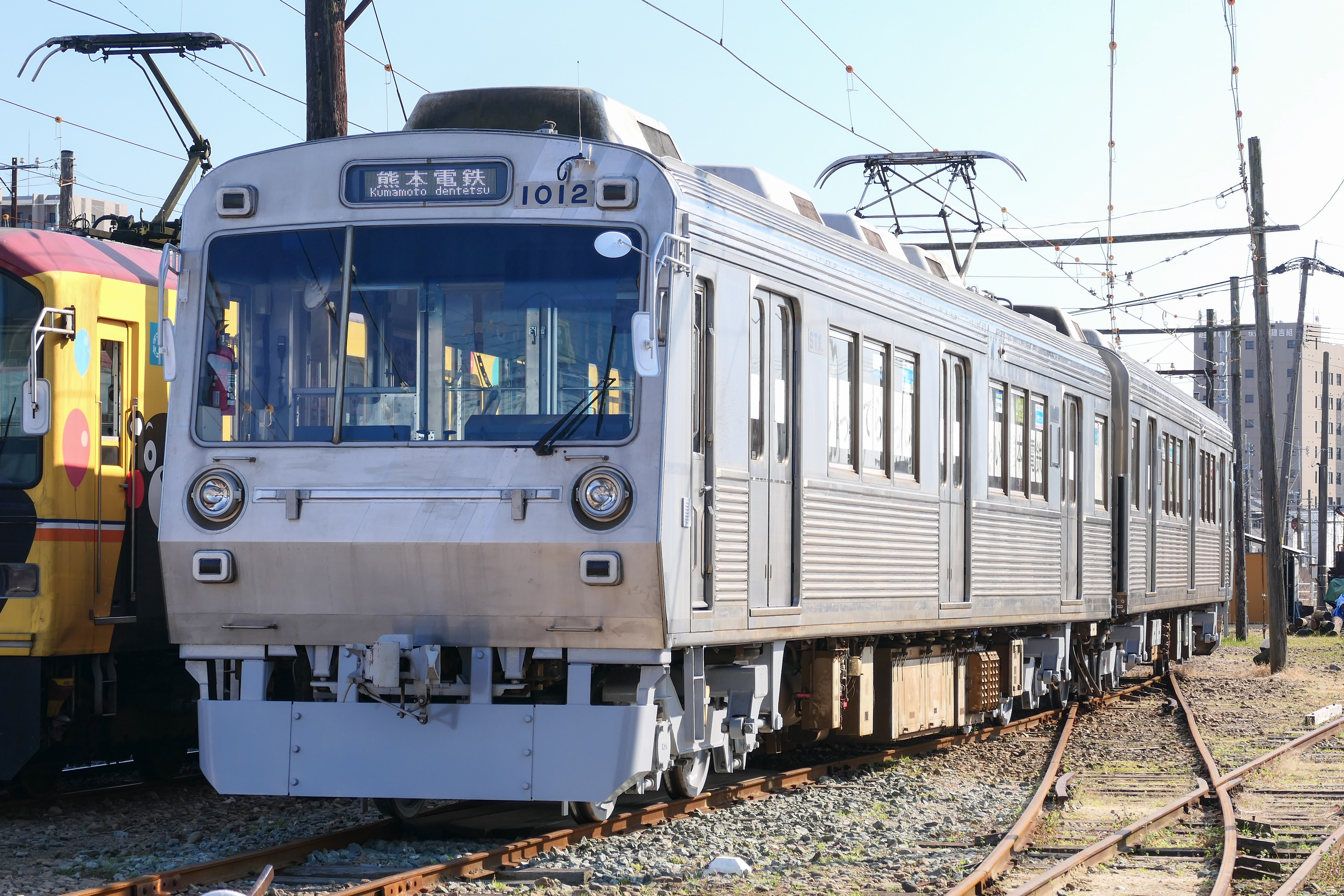
Kumamoto Electric Railway 1000 series, February 2024

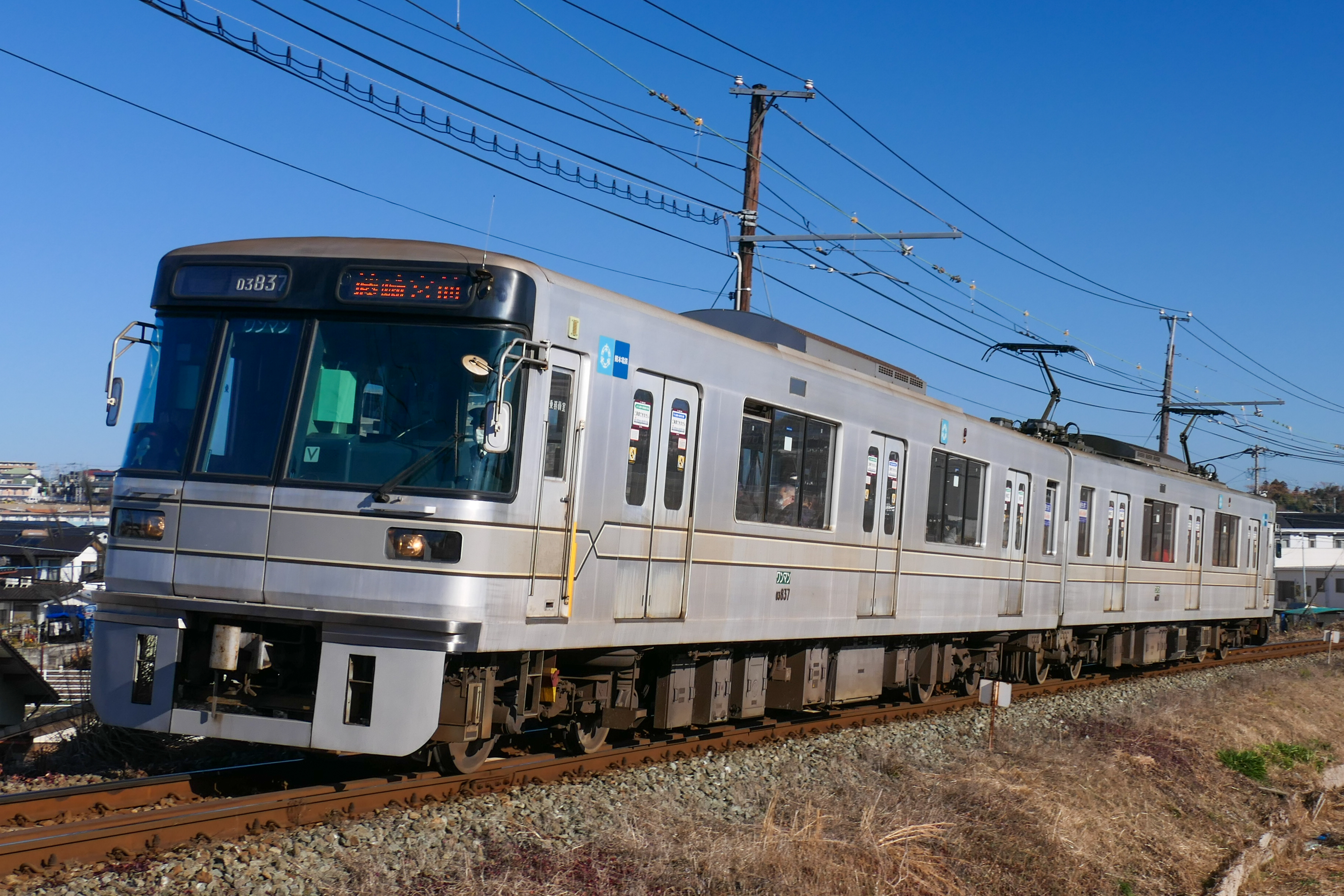
Kumamoto Electric Railway 03 series

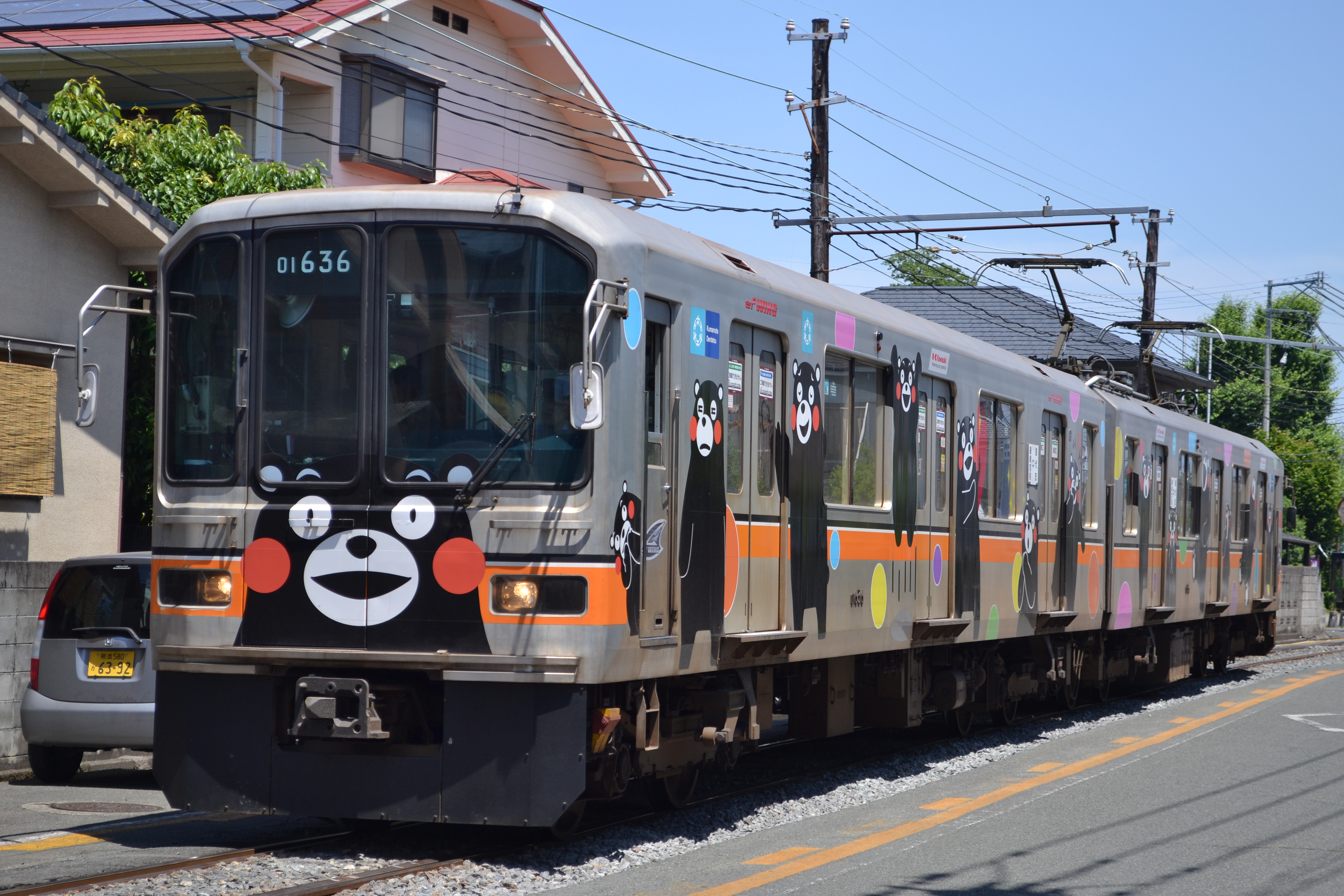
Kumamoto Electric Railway 01 series

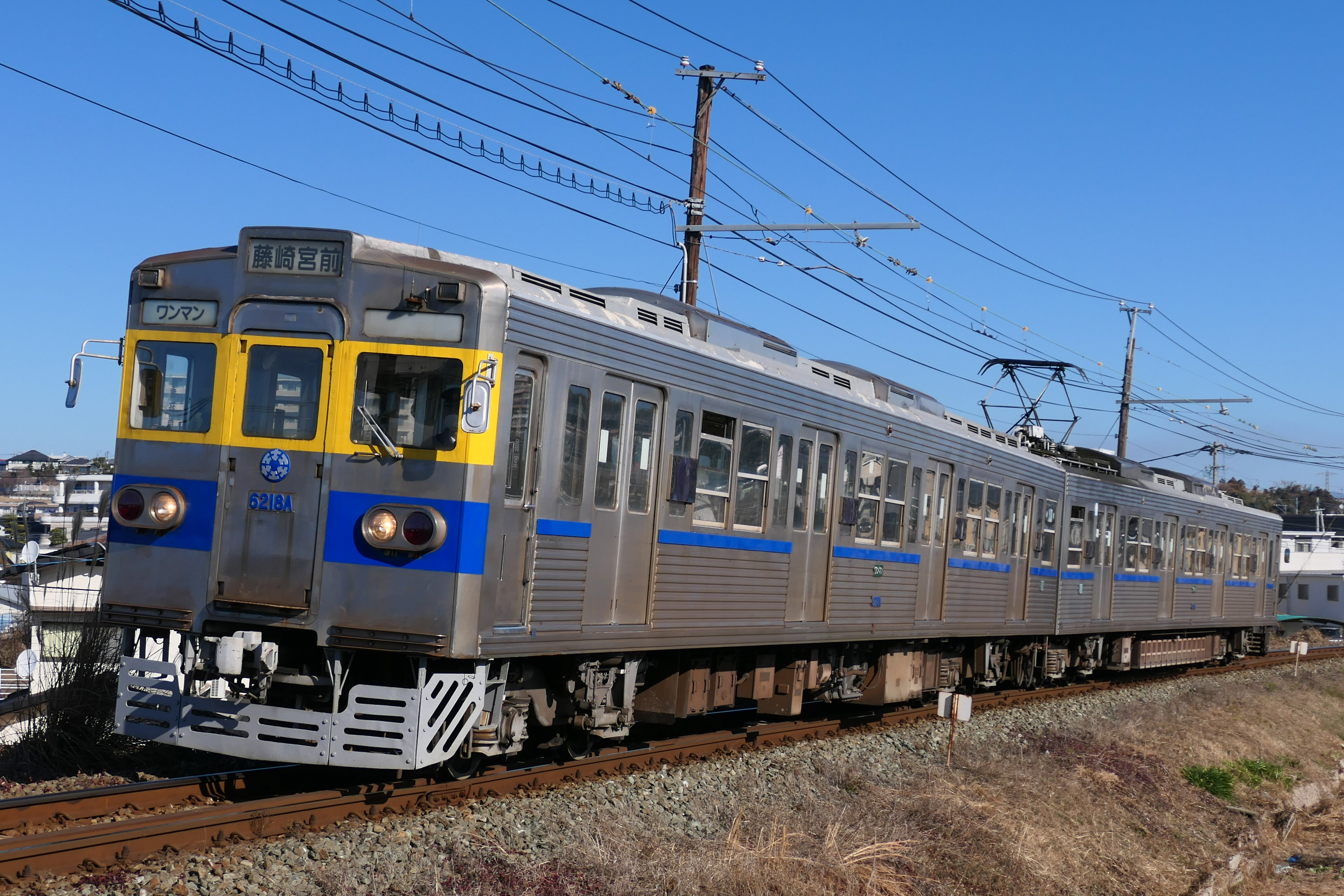
Kumamoto Electric Railway 6000 series

=== Former ===
- 200 series EMU (former Nankai Electric Railway 22000 series)
- 5000 series EMUs (former Tokyu 5000 series)
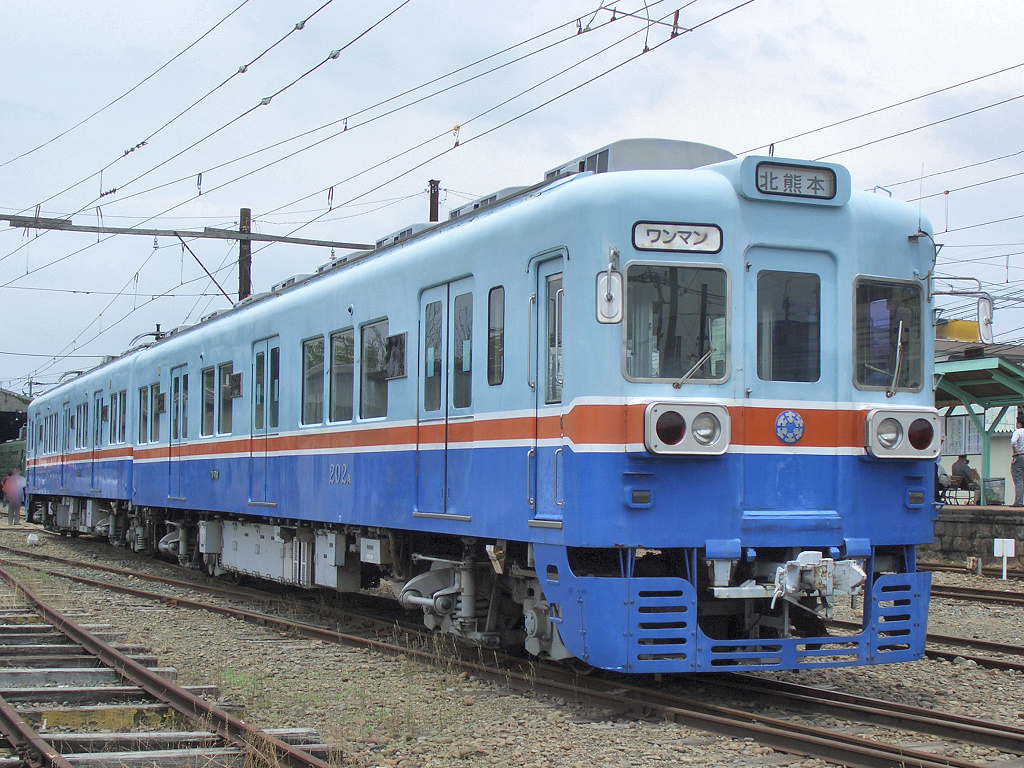
Kumamoto Electric Railway 200 series

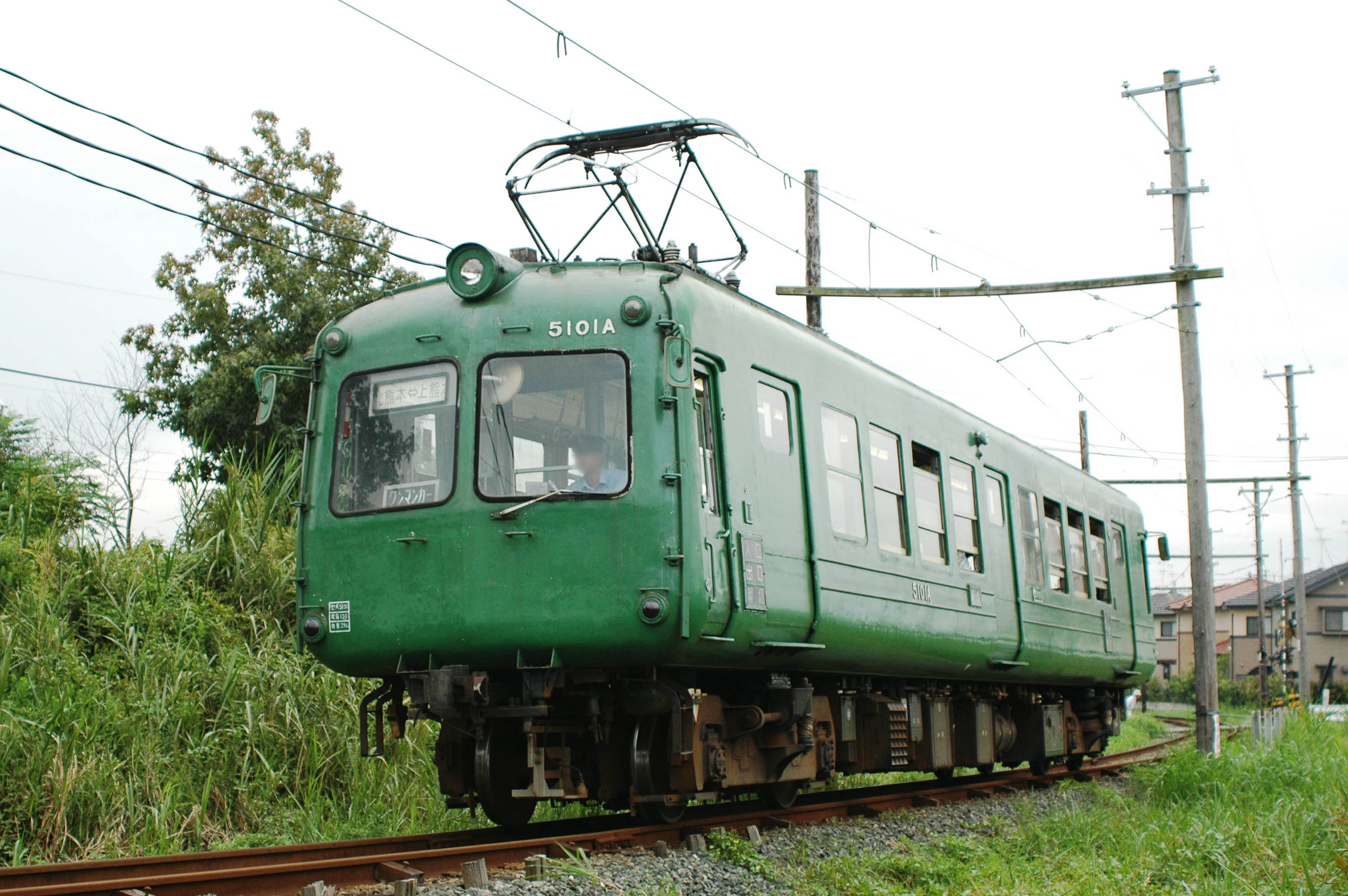
Kumamoto Electric Railway 5000 series

== History ==
The forerunner of the company, Kikuchi Tramway (菊池軌道), was established in on 15 August 1909, and opened the 914 mm (3 ft) gauge steam-hauled line from Ikeda Station (池田駅) (close to the present-day Kami-Kumamoto Station) to Sendanbatamachi Station (千反畑町駅) (present-day Fujisakigū-mae Station) on 1 October 1911. On 27 August 1913, the line between Ikeda and Waifu Station (隈府駅) (later named Kikuchi) was opened.

From 31 August 1923, the line was converted to 1,067 mm (3 ft 6 in) gauge and electrified at 600 V DC.

The current section of the Kikuchi Line between Kita-Kumamoto and Kami-Kumamoto opened on 1 October 1950, resulting in two lines between those stations, the original via Fujisakigū-mae and the new line. In June 1953 the original line from Kami-Kumamoto to Fujisakigū-mae closed. The 13.5 km Miyoshi to Kikuchi section closed on 16 February 1986 due to falling patronage.

== See also ==
- List of railway companies in Japan
