= Kami-Kumamoto Station =

Railway station in Kumamoto, Japan

Coordinates: 32°49′5″N 130°41′58″E

Kami-Kumamoto Station 上熊本駅
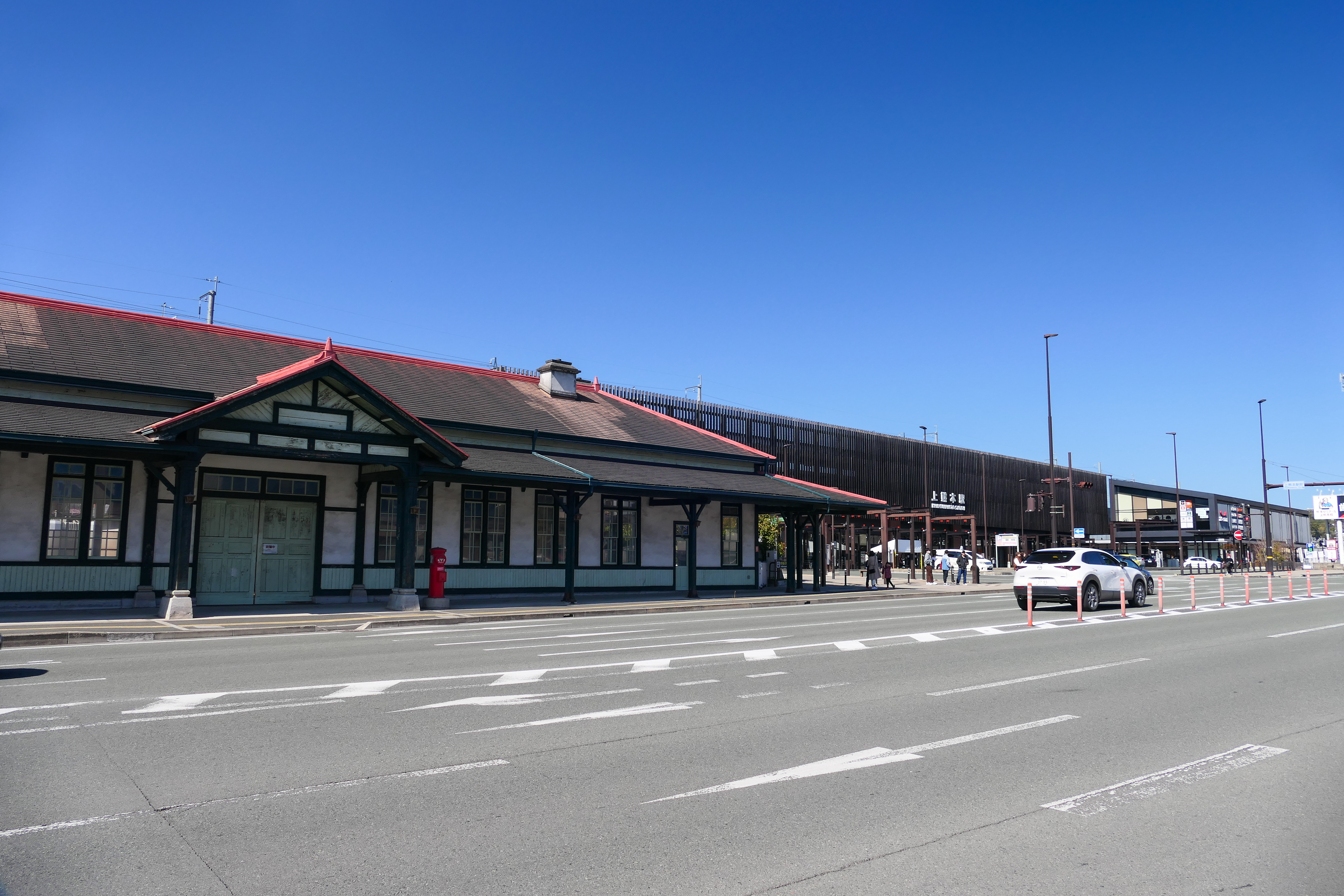
- Tram stop building (left, reuses façade of the former JR building), the current JR station (back center), and a station sign for the Kumamoto Electric Railway station (right, below billboard)

General information
- Location: 2-18-1 Kami-Kumamoto, Nishi, Kumamoto, Kumamoto （熊本市西区上熊本二丁目18-1） Japan
- Operator: Kyushu Railway Company, Kumamoto Electric Railway
- Lines: Kagoshima Main Line, Kikuchi Line

History
- Opened: 1891
Location

Kami-Kumamoto Station (上熊本駅, Kami-Kumamoto-eki) is a railway station in Nishi-ku, Kumamoto, Japan. It is on the Kagoshima Main Line of JR Kyushu and the Kikuchi Line of Kumamoto Electric Railway. In front of the station is a tram stop of the tram operated by Kumamoto City Transportation Bureau named Kami-Kumamoto-Ekimae Station.

== Lines ==
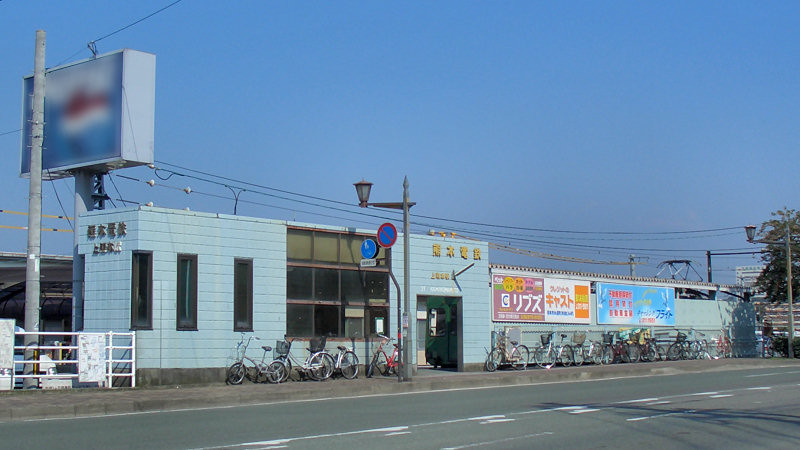
Kumamoto Electric Railway station building

- Kyushu Railway Company
  - Kagoshima Main Line
- Kumamoto Electric Railway
  - Kikuchi Line

== Environs ==
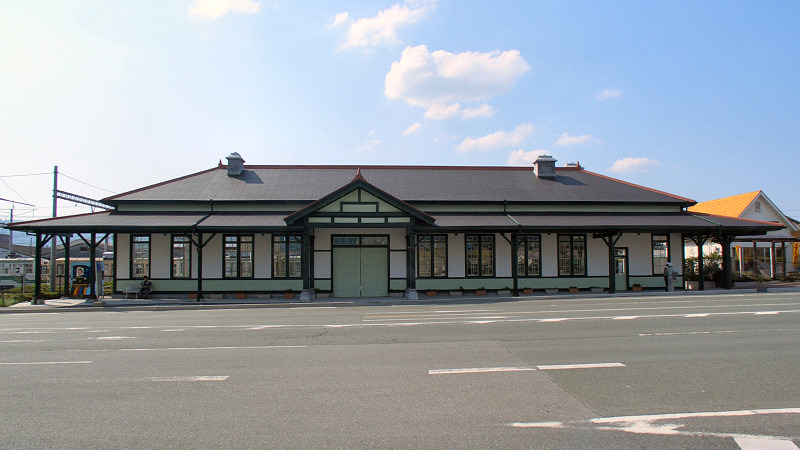
Kami-Kumamoto-Ekimae tram stop

- Kumamoto City Transportation Bureau: Kami-Kumamoto-Ekimae tram stop
- Kumamoto Castle
- Kumamoto Prefectural Gymnasium
- Kyōmachi-Honchō Post office
- Kumamoto District Meteorological Observatory
- Honmyōji Temple
- Kumamoto University Elementary School and Junior High School
- Kumamoto City Kyōryō Junior High School
- Kumamoto City Iseri Junior High School
