= Kagami =

Kagami, sometimes spelled Kagamine, may refer to:

== People ==
- Takaya Kagami, Japanese manga writer.
- Toshio Kagami, chairman CEO of The Oriental Land Company
- Kenkichi Kagami, Japanese businessman
- Kensuke Kagami, Japanese football player
- Kisho Kagami, Japanese baseball player
- Yuka Kagami, Japanese freestyle wrestler
- Kagami Jūrō, Japanese samurai
- Princess Kagami, Japanese princess and waka poet
- Saki Kagami, Japanese former actress
- Kagami Yoshimizu, the creator and author of Lucky Star

== Fictional characters ==
- Kagami Hiiragi, a character in the anime and manga series Lucky Star
- Kagamine Rin/Len, powerful Vocaloid voicebanks
- The last name of Kuro, a character in the manga series Kodomo no Jikan
- The last name of Arata, a character in the series Kamen Rider Kabuto
- Kagami Yagami, a character in the anime Sasami-san@Ganbaranai
- Kagami Todori, a character in the anime Fantasista Doll
- Kagami Tsurugi, a character in the French-Korean-Japanese cartoon Miraculous: Tales of Ladybug & Cat noir
- Taiga Kagami, one of the main protagonists of the anime Kuroko's Basketball
- Araya Kagami, a character from the 2019 video game AI: The Somnium Files.

== Places ==
- Kagami, Kōchi (Kami), a town located in the former Kami District, Kochi, Japan
- Kagami, Kōchi (Tosa), a village located in Tosa District, Kochi, Japan
- Kagami Shrine, Shinto shrine located in Karatsu
- Kagami, Kumamoto, was a town located in Yatsuhiro District
- Kagami Station, a railway station

== Film and television ==
- Muse no Kagami, Japanese television drama series
- Muse no Kagami (film), is a 2012 Japanese film
- Arei no Kagami, Japanese animation by Leiji Matsumoto

== Music ==
- Kagami no Dress, is the 29th single by Noriko Sakai
- Sora no Kagami, is the 1997 debut album by Takako Matsu

== Other uses ==
- Yata no Kagami, a sacred mirror and one of the Imperial Regalia of Japan
- The top braiding surface on a Marudai
- Kagami mochi is a traditional Japanese New Year decoration
- Kagami biraki is a traditional Japanese ceremony
- Azuma Kagami is a Japanese historical chronicle

== See also ==
- Kagame (surname)
