= RKK Kumamoto Broadcasting =

Radio and television broadcaster in Kumamoto, Japan

RKK Kumamoto Broadcasting Co., Ltd.
- Logo since 2023

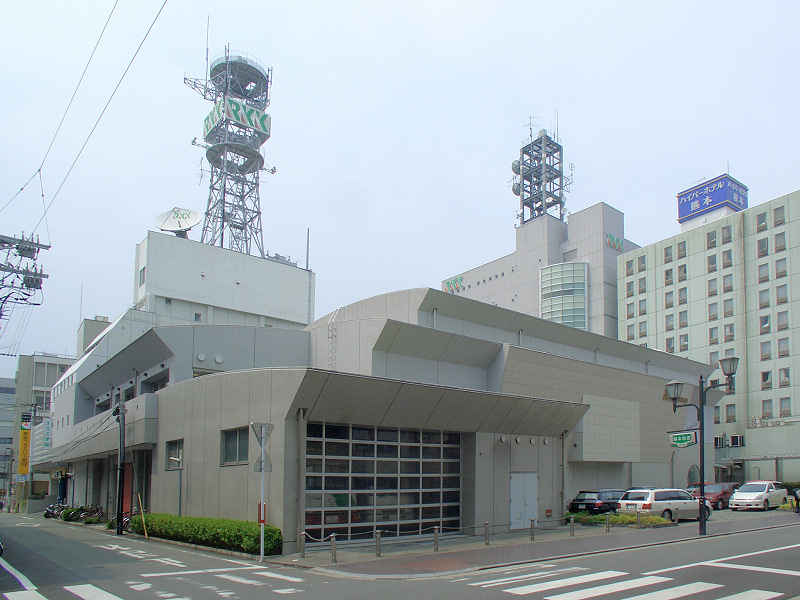
- Native name: 株式会社熊本放送
- Romanized name: Kabushiki gaisha Kumamoto Hōsō
- Type: Private (Kabushiki gaisha)
- Industry: Television network
- Founded: July 11, 1953
- Headquarters: 30 Yamazaki-cho, Chuo-ku, Kumamoto City, Kumamoto Prefecture, Japan
- Website: rkk.jp
- Footnotes; Data from its Corporate Profile

JOBF
- Kumamoto; Japan
- Broadcast area: Kumamoto Prefecture
- Frequencies: 1197 kHz AM; 91.4 MHz FM
- Branding: RKK Radio

Programming
- Language: Japanese
- Format: Talk, Sports
- Affiliations: JRN, NRN

Ownership
- Owner: RKK Kumamoto Broadcasting Co., Ltd.

History
- First air date: October 10, 1953

Technical information
- Licensing authority: MIC
- Power: 10 kW

Links
- Website: rkk.jp/radio/

JOBF-DTV
- Kumamoto Prefecture; Japan
- City: Kumamoto City
- Channels: Digital: 41 (UHF); Virtual: 3
- Branding: RKK Television

Programming
- Language: Japanese
- Affiliations: Japan News Network

Ownership
- Owner: RKK Kumamoto Broadcasting Co., Ltd.

History
- First air date: April 1, 1959
- Former call signs: JOBF-TV (1959–2011)
- Former channel numbers: Analog: 11 (VHF, 1959–2011)

Technical information
- Licensing authority: MIC

Links
- Website: rkk.jp/tv/

RKK Kumamoto Broadcasting Co., Ltd. (株式会社熊本放送, Kabushiki gaisha Kumamoto Hōsō; RKK) is a regional radio and television broadcaster headquartered in Kumamoto, Kumamoto, Japan that serves Kumamoto Prefecture.

RKK was founded in 1953, commenced radio broadcast in October 1953, and television in April 1959. RKK is affiliated with the JNN (TV), JRN and NRN (radio). It is the only commercial broadcasting that provides both TV and radio services in Kumamoto prefecture.

On December 1, 2006, RKK started broadcasting digital terrestrial television.

== History ==
On January 4, 1953, Futo Izu, the then president of Kumamoto Nihon Shimbun, proposed the establishment of a radio station, which was unanimously agreed by those present. At 6:10 a.m. on October 1 of the same year, Kumamoto Prefecture’s first private radio station, Radio Kumamoto (ラジオ熊本), funded by Kumamoto Nihon Shimbun, officially started broadcasting. The first program broadcast was "Farm House Time". Radio Kumamoto achieved a profit of 510,000 yen in the first half year of broadcasting. At that time, the Japanese private broadcasting industry was generally in a deficit within 3 years of broadcasting, which was very rare. By 1955, Radio Kumamoto had successfully repaid all debts since its broadcasting, and achieved a profit of 52 million yen. In the early days of broadcasting, Radio Kumamoto was located on the third floor of the old building of Kumamoto Niichi Shimbun. But with business expansion and preparations for broadcasting television, Kumamoto Broadcasting decided to build a new headquarters. In 1957, Kumamoto Broadcasting purchased land near the Kumamoto Electric and Communication Bureau of the Electric Corporation, and began construction of the second-generation headquarters in May 1958. In order to start broadcasting on TV, Radio Kumamoto also increased its capital to 150 million yen in 1958. At the end of March 1959, the second-generation headquarters of Radio Kumamoto was completed, with three floors and a total floor area of 4,848 square meters.

At 8:50 a.m. on April 1, 1959, Radio Kumamoto officially began to broadcast TV programs. It was also the second TV station and the first private TV station in Kumamoto Prefecture after the NHK Kumamoto Broadcasting Station. At that time, there were only about 30,000 TV sets in Kumamoto Prefecture. Shortly after the broadcast started, Radio Kumamoto participated in the broadcast of the wedding of Crown Prince Akihito and Michiko Masada. From the beginning of the broadcast to September 1961, Radio Kumamoto's daily broadcast time was divided into two periods, day and night, with a break in between. At that time, there were no television stations in neighboring Saga Prefecture, but RKK's television signal could be received in most areas. Therefore, the people of Saga Prefecture asked RKK to set up a branch in Saga Prefecture to broadcast news from there. And Kumamoto Radio also opened the Saga branch in June 1960, and continued until 1974 when the number of TV stations receivable in Saga Prefecture increased.

In 1961, in order to reflect the reality that television business gradually surpassed broadcasting and became the company's main business, Radio Kumamoto changed the company name to the current Kumamoto Broadcasting, but the initials remained unchanged. In 1963, 10 years after starting, the number of employees of Kumamoto Broadcasting increased from 49 at the beginning to more than 200, and its profit also increased to 198 million yen. In October 1966, Kumamoto Broadcasting began broadcasting color TV programs. In 1967, Kumamoto Broadcasting's TV division joined the TBS television network. In April 1971, Kumamoto Broadcasting established a branch in Yatsushiro to strengthen news gathering and advertising business capabilities in southern Kumamoto Prefecture.

On April 7, 1972, the RKK Hall funded by Kumamoto Broadcasting was completed. The building has one floor underground and eight floors above ground, with a total floor area of 4,778 square meters and a total construction cost of 400 million yen. The various subsidiaries of Kumamoto Broadcasting work here. In 1973, Kumamoto Broadcasting's report on the Taiyo Department Store fire won the JNN Award. In the same year, Kumamoto Broadcasting also broadcast the Minamata Disease Court Judgment. In the mid-1970s, Kumamoto Broadcasting promoted business diversification, established subsidiaries such as RKK Development, and entered various industries such as real estate and travel. At the same time, Kumamoto Broadcasting introduced a complete two-day weekend system in 1975, making it the fifth private radio and television station in Kyushu to achieve it.

Former logo

In 1984, Kumamoto Broadcasting introduced a new logo, using green and red as the main colors. On August 1 of the same year, Kumamoto Broadcasting began to build the second hall of RKK. The building has three floors, with a total floor area of 1,617.75 square meters. The first floor is a TV studio, the second floor is an office, and the third floor is a radio recording studio. In 1992, Kumamoto Broadcasting and Kumamoto Kenmin Television (KKT) co-produced the program "Here is RKKT" (こちらRKKT, the name being a combination of both RKK and KKT), creating an innovative case of mutual cooperation between local private TV stations. In 1996, Kumamoto Broadcasting opened its official website.

On August 2, 1999, the new headquarters of Kumamoto Broadcasting were completed. The building is divided into two parts, the 8-story office building and the 3-story studio building. With a cost of 6.5 billion yen, Kumamoto Broadcasting has enough broadcasting facilities to cope with the digital TV era. On November 1, 2006, Kumamoto Broadcasting began broadcasting digital TV signals. On July 24, 2011, RKK shut down its analog signals for good. In 2012, Kumamoto Broadcasting began broadcasting the Kumamoto Castle Marathon, and achieved an average high audience rating of 33.2%. In 2013, on the occasion of the 60th anniversary of its founding, Kumamoto Broadcasting launched the a new logo. In 2019, Kumamoto Broadcasting and Kumamoto Asahi Broadcasting (KAB) achieved cross-platform cooperation. In 2023, the 70th anniversary of its founding, Kumamoto Broadcasting launched a new logo, using blueish-green as its primary color.
