= Nako Mizusawa =

Japanese actress (born 1993)

- Born: October 1, 1993 (age 32); Aichi Prefecture, Japan
- Occupation: Actress

Nako Mizusawa (水沢奈子, Mizusawa Nako; born October 1, 1993 in Aichi Prefecture) is a former Japanese actress.

== Filmography ==
=== Television ===
- Garo: Makai Senki (Misao) (2011)
- Sumire 16 sai!! (Sumire Yotsuya) (2008)
- Muse no Kagami (2012)

=== Movies ===
- Akanbo Shojo (Yoko Nanjo) (2008)
- Tokyo Gore School (2009)
- Mai Mai Miracle (Kiiko Shimazu, voice) (2009)
- Listen to My Heart (2009)
- Gantz: Perfect Answer (2011)
- Kishibe-chou Kidan: Tanbou-hen (2012)
- Muse no Kagami (2012)
