= Listen to My Heart (film) =

- DVD cover
- Directed by: Shinichi Mishiro
- Starring: Takako Tokiwa; Kento Hayashi; Nako Mizusawa; Teruhiko Saigō; Kōsuke Toyohara; Kaoru Yachigusa; Tatsuya Nakadai
- Distributed by: Shochiku
- Release date: October 10, 2009 (Japan)
- Running time: 119 minutes
- Country: Japan
- Language: Japanese

Listen to My Heart (Japanese: 引き出しの中のラブレター, Hepburn: Hikidashi no naka no rabu retā) is a 2009 Japanese drama film directed by Shinichi Mishiro.

== Cast ==
- Takako Tokiwa as Mao Kubota
- Kento Hayashi
- Tomoko Nakajima
- Nozomu Iwao
- Terunosuke Takezai
- Nako Mizusawa
- Teruhiko Saigō
- Masato Hagiwara
- Kōsuke Toyohara
- Tsurutaro Kataoka (special appearance)
- Shirō Itō (special appearance)
- Kaoru Yachigusa
- Tatsuya Nakadai
