= Kishibe-chou Kidan: Tanbou-hen =

- Directed by: Kazuyoshi Hayashi
- Starring: Ami Yokota; Nako Mizusawa
- Release date: June 9, 2012 (Japan)
- Country: Japan
- Language: Japanese

Kishibe-chou Kidan: Tanbou-hen (岸部町奇談 探訪編) is a 2012 Japanese horror film directed by Kazuyoshi Hayashi.

== Cast ==
- Ami Yokota as Tomoko Takayanagi
- Nako Mizusawa as Miu Kuroe
