= Yuka Ogata =

Japanese politician (born 1975)

Yūka Ogata
- 緒方 夕佳

Member of the Kumamoto City Assembly
- Incumbent
- Assumed office 13 April 2015
- Constituency: Higashi-ku

Personal details
- Born: 1 August 1975 (age 51)
- Party: Kumamoto Peace Association (和の会くまもと)
- Children: 2
- Education: Tokyo University of Foreign Studies; George Mason University
- Website: ogatayuuka.com

Yuka Ogata (緒方 夕佳, Ogata Yūka; born 1 August 1975) is a Japanese local politician and a member of the Kumamoto City Assembly. She was first elected in the 2015 local elections, winning 4,196 votes in the Higashi Ward of Kumamoto. Before entering public office, Ogata was an officer in the Yemen office of UNDP.

== Baby in assembly controversy ==
Ogata was the center of a November 2017 controversy in the City Assembly. Unable to obtain a nursery spot, she entered an assembly session with her infant son to highlight the difficulties facing children-raising working Japanese parents and the lack of nursery spaces. Soon after taking her seat, the council speaker Yoshitomo Sawada and his colleagues confronted her to ask why she had brought her infant into the chamber. After several minutes, Ogata yielded and was escorted to the speaker's office. She then returned to the delayed session alone after leaving her son in a friend's care. Sawada later apologised for opening the session 40 minutes late, but another assemblyman was heard to implicitly blame Ogata instead for the episode. The assembly did not have a rule prohibiting members to enter the chamber with their children, but the assembly considered the baby as a visitor, who is required to sit in the gallery.

The local incident unexpectedly gained national and international prominence. It was cited as a proof that the current environment is hostile for Japanese women juggling between their careers and families, and even worse for those in politics. Commentators observed that Ogata's actions illustrated how the impact Prime Minister Shinzo Abe's womenomics policies were still limited. Ogata also criticised the fact that women with children were rarely consulted in policy making.

Ogata was later reprimanded by the assembly for disrupting proceedings. The assembly passed a proposal in February, banning any non-members from entering the debating chamber as a response to the November incident.
