= Terunosuke Takezai =

Japanese actor

- 竹財 輝之助
- Born: Kumamoto Prefecture, Japan
- Education: Kumamoto Municipal Hitsuyukan Senior High School; Kyūshū Lutheran College
- Occupation: Actor
- Years active: 1995–present
- Agent: Stardust Promotion
- Spouse: Miho Fujima (m. 2014)
- Children: 1

Terunosuke Takezai (Japanese: 竹財 輝之助, Hepburn: Takezai Terunosuke) is a Japanese actor. He made his acting debut in the 2004 show, Kamen Rider Blade. He's also famous for his lead role in the Pornographer series.

== Filmography ==
=== Film ===
Year	Title	Role	Notes	Ref.
2004	Kamen Rider Blade: Missing Ace	Kotarō Shirai		
2008	One Million Yen Girl	Yūki		
2009	Listen to My Heart	Kōhei		
2018	Marmalade Boy	Shin'ichi Namura		
2021	Pornographer: Playback	Rio Kijima	Lead role	
2024	Toxic Daughter			
2025	Romantic Killer	Tsuchiya		
2025	S-Friends 4	Sakutaro Hasegawa		
2026	The Convenience Store	Shinji Saruwatari		

=== Television ===
Year	Title	Role	Notes	Ref.
2004	Kamen Rider Blade	Kotarō Shirai		
2008	Atsuhime	Prince Arisugawa Taruhito	Taiga drama	
2011	QP			
2012	Doctor Ume	Kinoshita	Asadora	
2013	Hanzawa Naoki	Ryota Shimada		
2014	Hero	Keigo Shiroyama	Episode 7	
2018	Pornographer	Rio Kijima	Lead role; miniseries	
2019	Pornographer: Mood Indigo	Rio Kijima	Lead role; miniseries	
2022	The 13 Lords of the Shogun	Itō Sukekiyo	Taiga drama	
2023	Trillion Game	Tadanori Nagase		
2024	Oshi no Ko	Himura		
