= Prefectural University of Kumamoto =

Public University in Kumamoto, Kumamoto, Japan

Coordinates: 32°48′21″N 130°45′52″E

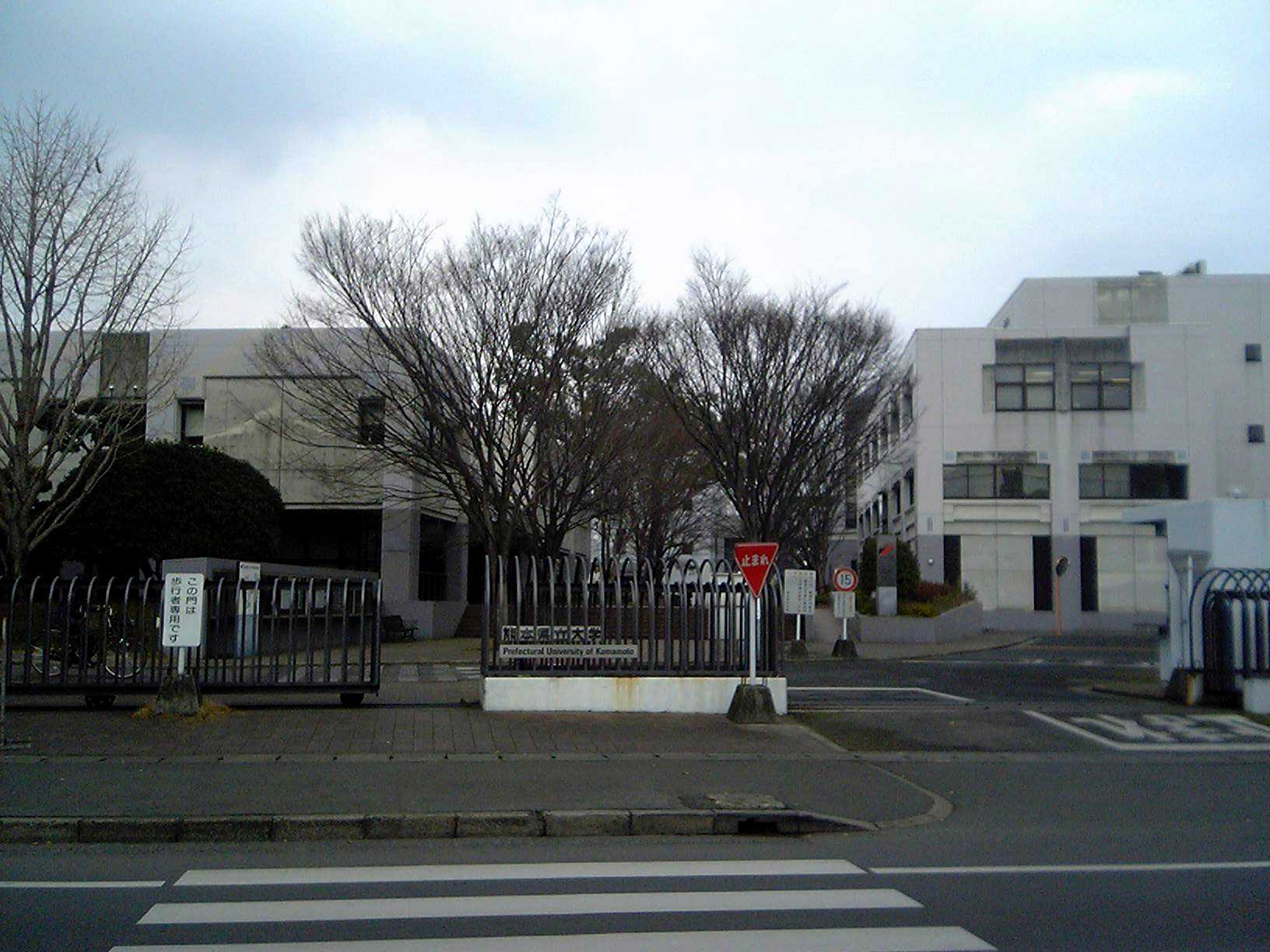
Prefectural University of Kumamoto

Prefectural University of Kumamoto (熊本県立大学, Kumamoto Kenritsu Daigaku) is a public university in the city of Kumamoto, Kumamoto, Japan. The predecessor of the school was founded in 1947. The school population is approximately 2,200 students and 100 faculty members.
