= Kagame (surname) =

Kagame is a surname. Notable people with the surname include:

- Alexis Kagame (1912–1981), Rwandan historian
- Ange Kagame (born 1993), Rwandan philanthropist
- Jeannette Kagame (born 1962), First Lady of Rwanda
- Kayije Kagame (born 1987), Rwandan–Swiss artist and actress
- Paul Kagame (born 1957), President of Rwanda
- Shyaka Kagamé (born 1983), Rwandan–Swiss filmmaker

== See also ==
- Kagame Inter-Club Cup, a football club competition also known as the CECAFA Club Cup
- Kagami (disambiguation)
