= Kumamoto Sakuramachi Bus Terminal =

Bus terminal in central Kumamoto, Kumamoto, Japan

Coordinates: 32°48′0″N 130°42′13″E

Kumamoto Sakuramachi Bus Terminal (熊本桜町バスターミナル) is the key bus terminal located in central Kumamoto, Kumamoto.

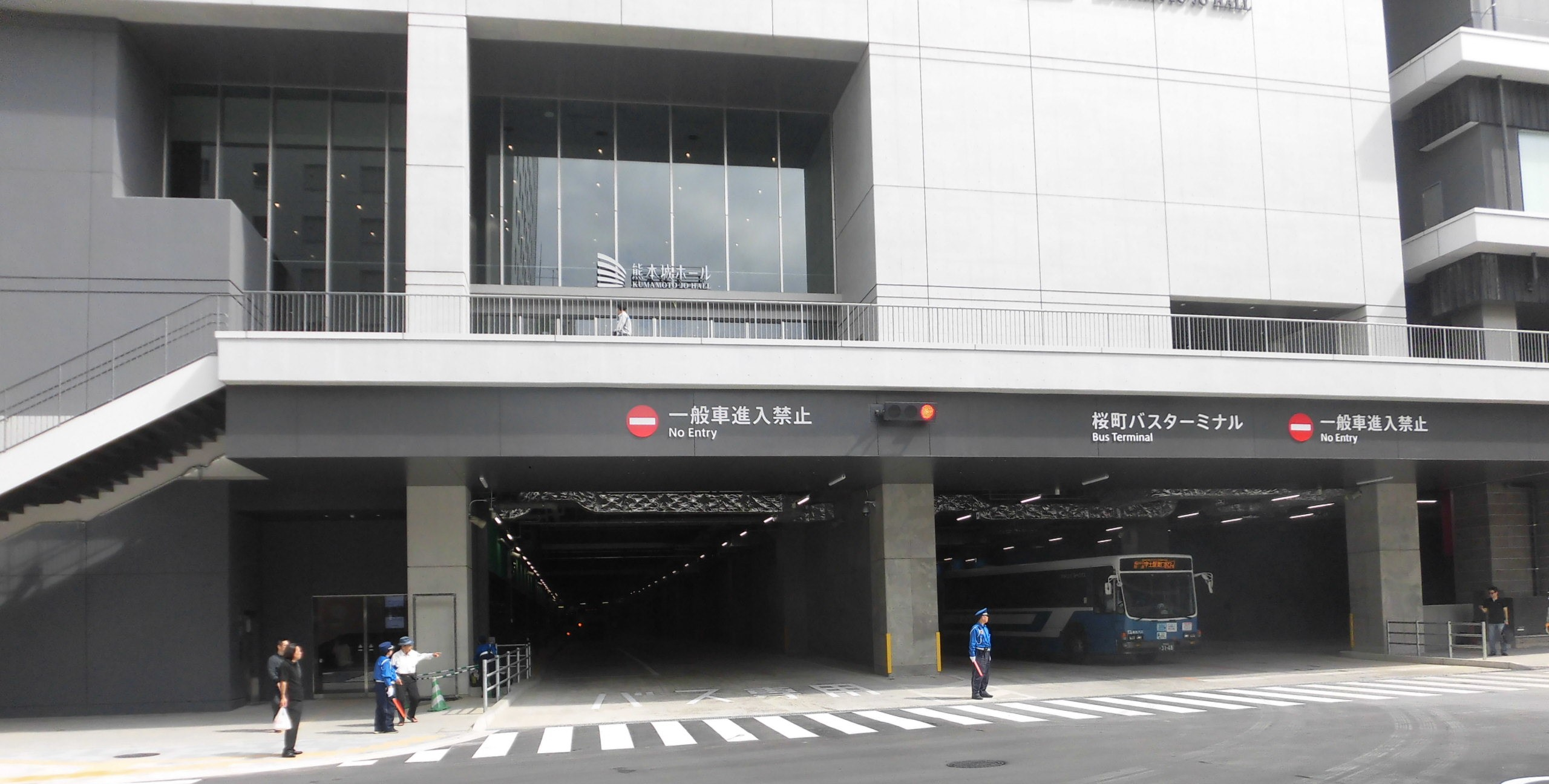
Front of Kumamoto Bus Terminal

== History ==
Kumamoto Bus terminal had been opened on March 5, 1969, gathering bus stops around Sakura-cho, Chūō-ku, Kumamoto.

== Terminals ==
- 4 Platforms
- 36 Arrivals

== Bus routes ==
=== Local bus ===
- Kyushu Sanko Bus
- Kumamoto City Transportation Bureau
- Kumamoto Electric Railway
- Kumamoto Bus

=== Express bus ===
- Kyushu Sanko Bus
- Kintetsu Bus
- Iwasaki Group
- Meitetsu Bus
- Miyazaki Kotsu
- Nangoku Kotsu
- Oita Bus
- Nishi-Nippon Railroad
- Saihi Motor (Saihi Bus)
- Transportation Bureau of Nagasaki Prefecture (Nagasaki Ken-ei Bus)

== Nearby places ==
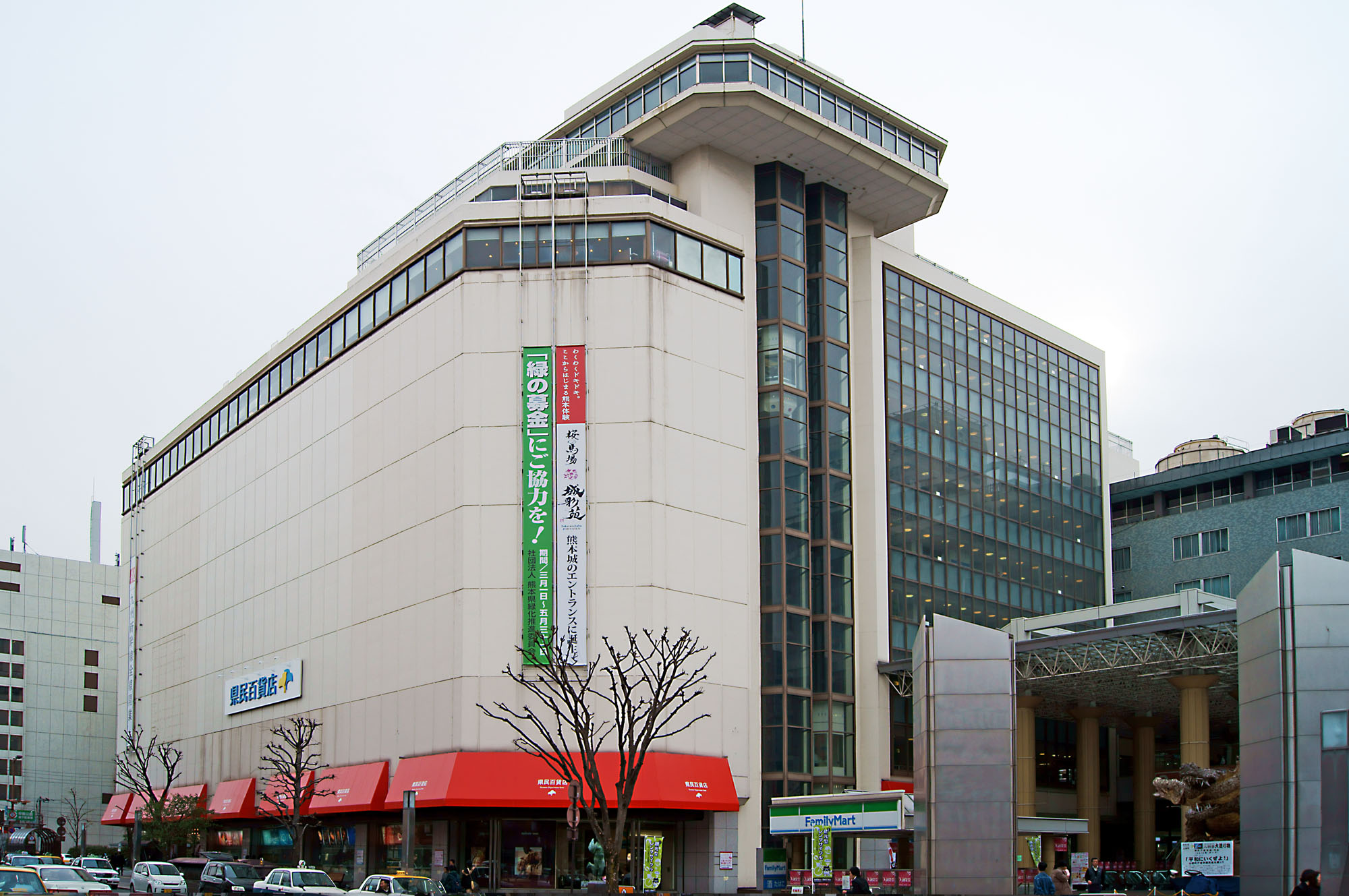
Kenmin Hyakkaten, March 2011

- Kumamoto Bus Terminal Hotel
- Kenmin Hyakkaten Company - closed in February 2015
- Center Plaza
- Kumamoto Civic Hall
- Kyushu Sangyo Kotsu Holdings
- Kumamoto Castle
