= Miho Fujima =

Japanese actress

- Born: 29 November 1978 (age 47); Saitama, Japan
- Occupation: Actress
- Spouse: Terunosuke Takezai (m. 2014)
- Children: 1

Miho Fujima (藤真 美穂, Fujima Miho; born 29 November 1978) is a Japanese actress.

== Filmography ==
- Lift (2002)
- Ju-on: The Grudge a.k.a. The Grudge (2003)
- "Slow Is Beautiful" (2003)
- Suicide Manual (2003)
- Bridge: Kono hashi no mukou ni (Bridge ～この橋の向こうに～ ) (2004)
- 穴～夢穴～ (2004)
- フーチャ～旋律の彼方へ～ (2004)
- Sennenbi (2004)
- Dolphins Swim (2004)
- Yogen (2004)
- 二人の青春バルコニー (2004)
- Tony Takitani (2005)
- Haikyo (廃墟, lit. "ruins") (2005)
- Kamyu nante shiranai (カミュなんて知らない )(2005)
- Shounen Sasamochi (少年笹餅; lit. "youth, bamboo ricecake") (2005)
- Blue (2005)
- Love Jank! (2005)
- Kagi ga nai (鍵がない, lit. "no key") (2005)
