= Tadako Urata =

Japanese physician (1873–1936)

- 宇良田 唯子
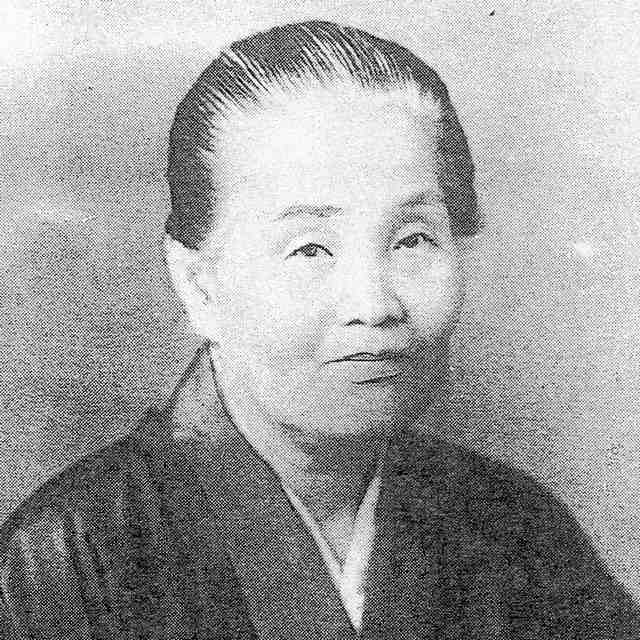
- Urata Tadako, aged about 60 years
- Born: 3 May 1873; Ushibuka
- Died: 18 June 1936 (aged 63); Tokyo
- Other names: Urata Tada, Yui Nakamura
- Occupation: Physician

Tadako Urata (宇良田 唯子) (3 May 1873 – 18 June 1936) was a Japanese physician, trained in ophthalmology in Germany. She and her husband ran a clinic in Tianjin, China, from 1912 to 1932.

== Early life and education ==
Urata was born in Ushibuka (now part of Amakusa city), the daughter of writer and businessman Urata Genshō. She trained as a pharmacist in Kumamoto, then earned a medical license in Tokyo in 1899; she studied infectious diseases at Kitasato Shibasaburo's Institute for Study of Infectious Diseases. In 1903, she left Japan for Germany, to pursue further studies in ophthalmology, one of the first group of Japanese women to seek advanced degrees abroad.

Urata earned a doctorate at the University of Marburg in 1905, with a dissertation on the prevention of neonatal gonococcal conjunctivitis. Her dissertation research was published as "Experimentelle Untersuchungen über den Wert des sogenannten Credéschen Tropfens" in Ophthalmologica. "Urata was not only the first female Japanese," noted Helmut Sies in 2016, "but also the first female ever who obtained the title of medical doctor at Marburg University." The milestone was reported internationally, in both professional journals and daily newspapers.

== Career ==
Urata returned to Japan in 1906 and opened a practice in ophthalmology in Tokyo. Later, with her husband, she ran a clinic in Tianjin, China, from 1912 to 1932. She was an officer of the Japanese Women's Medical Association, and held the honorary title Professor of Medicine from the Japanese government.

== Personal life and legacy ==
Urata was briefly married as a young woman, but left the marriage to continue her education. She married a fellow doctor, Nakamura Tsunesaburō, in 1911. She was a widow when she died in 1936, in Tokyo. In 1992 she was named a "Person of Cultural Merit" for Kumamoto Prefecture. There is a monument to Urata in her hometown. A place on the campus of the university of Marburg is named after her.
