= The Convenience Store =

2026 horror film directed by Jirô Nagae

- Theatrical release poster
- Directed by: Jirô Nagae
- Screenplay by: Yoshimasa Akamatsu
- Story by: Chilla’s Art
- Based on: The Convenience Store by Chilla's Art
- Starring: Kotona Minami; Tetta Seki; Shunsuke Tanaka; Takeo Gozu; Mai Tezuka; Natsuki Kato; Terunosuke Takezai
- Cinematography: Masayuki Nakazawa
- Edited by: Masayuki Nakazawa
- Music by: Daisuke Nishimura
- Production companies: NBCUniversal Entertainment Japan; Canter; Chilla’s Art
- Distributed by: Canter
- Release date: February 20, 2026
- Running time: 83 minutes
- Country: Japan
- Language: Japanese

The Convenience Store (Japanese: 夜勤事件) is a 2026 Japanese horror film screenplayed by Yoshimasa Akamatsu and directed by Jirô Nagae. The film is based on the independent video game of the same name by developer Chilla's Art. It stars Kotona Minami, Takeo Gozu, Tetta Seki, Terunosuke Takezai, Shunsuke Tanaka, Natsuki Kato, Mai Tezuka.

== Plot ==
Yukino Tazaru arrives at the convenience store where she works the night shift, but her manager, Tsurukawa, has gone missing. The following night, detectives Shinji Saruwatari and Kazuki Kondo arrive at the convenience store after Yukino discovers Tsurukawa's corpse. They examine the body, which is missing its eyes, alongside an SD card. Afterward, they take Yukino in for questioning. Meanwhile, Yukino's coworker, Funabashi, is hospitalized.

At the police station, Yukino gives Saruwatari four SD cards, given over the course of four days. The first night, a homeless man warns Yukino of impending danger before running away. Later that night, a deliveryman delivers the SD card. The next night, Yukino sees a woman staring at her from her car before driving away. Later, a confused elderly woman asks about a young boy named Ken. On the security cameras, Yukino sees a young boy she believes is Ken. At her home, she finds a box containing the SD card. On the second night, Yukino gets locked in the storeroom and is haunted by the spirits of Ken and a woman missing her eyes, alongside several nails on the floor. The door opens, and a female customer gives Yukino a protective talisman. Yukino is then haunted at her house, where she receives the third SD card. She is attacked by the woman with missing eyes on the fourth night, but is protected by the talisman. Ken directs Yukino to the basement, where she finds Tsurukawa's body, which sits up on its own.

Yukino insists that Saruwatari watch the footage, which contains grainy footage of Yukino's childhood home and a gruesome familicide. Saruwatari releases Yukino, and discusses the footage with Kondo, and they decide to continue the investigation. Later, Saruwatari's wife, Kana, reveals that she is pregnant. While looking at case files, Saruwatari sees Ken under his desk. The next day, he looks over files from a murder-suicide in which Onodera Masuharu killed his son, Ken, and his wife, Saeko, with a nail. After murdering them, Masuharu gouged out Saeko's eyes before killing himself.

Sarutawari continues to become obsessed with the case while being haunted by Ken and Saeko. He goes to the convenience store, finds rusty nails, and encounters the woman Yukino received the talisman from. Kondo calls Sarutawari, telling him that Yukino has gone missing and that Funabashi has awakened. Sarutawari harshly questions Funabashi, who says that Tusrukawa was having an affair with the woman who was watching Yukino. He recounts that, after finding Yukino passed out, he saw a homeless man and that he installed a hidden camera to catch the person whom he believed was stalking Yukino.

Saruwatari returns to the convenience store alone and finds the hidden camera. He reviews the footage, seeing Yukino and the homeless man hiding the unconscious Funabashi in a locker. The homeless man asks Yukino to copy the SD cards. He tells Yukino that she must pass on Saeko's curse by showing someone else the footage within four days, instructing her to show it to the detectives. Saruwatari rushes home to Kana, horrified to discover that he unknowingly showed her the footage over four days ago, cursing her and their unborn baby to die. Yukino returns home and finds a rusty nail on the street. She has visions of Tsurukawa's death, realizing that he was also cursed.

== Cast ==
- Kotona Minami as Yukino
- Tetta Seki as Takuya Funabashi
- Takeo Gozu as Yukio Matsuura
- Shunsuke Tanaka as Kazuki Kondo
- Mai Tezuka
- Atsuko Sakurai as Tamayo Shono
- Natsuki Kato as Kaho Saruwatari
- Terunosuke Takezai as Shinji Saruwatari

== Production ==
The film was produced under a production committee system which included Chilla’s Art, original creators of the horror game the movie adapts, contributing the story and creative direction. Canter, distributor and co-producer, likely involved in funding and logistics and NBCUniversal Entertainment Japan, helped with production support and possibly marketing/home video distribution. The film's theme song, titled Night Shift Incident, was performed by Liza.

=== Filming ===
The movie was shot primarily in practical sets replicating a convenience store, including both a full-scale interior set and on-location shots. Cinematography was done by Masayuki Nakazawa, focusing on tight, claustrophobic framing. Director Jirō Nagae aimed for a realistic but unsettling style and the production uses practical effects for jump scares and supernatural elements, rather than relying heavily on CGI.

== Release ==
The film was first screened at Human Trust Cinema Shibuya on January 28, 2026, and was released nationwide on February 20, 2026, under Canter and NBCUniversal Entertainment Japan.

== Differences from original game ==
To adapt The Convenience Store, the original plot had been expanded and minor details had been altered.

In the original game, the main protagonist was originally unnamed and the plot was shown from her point of view; in the film, she is named Yukino. The cursed video clips were originally on VHS tapes which were replaced with SD cards. Depending on the player's decision, watching or throwing away the last video clip gets the protagonist killed; returning the video to the sender results in the protagonist surviving her ordeal, quitting her job, and learning of the murder-suicide on the internet.

The policemen, Kaho Saruwatari and Tamayo Shono, are new characters added to expand the original plot which depicts the murder-suicide clips cursed like the one from The Ring.
