= Muse no Kagami (film) =

2012 Japanese film

- Directed by: Yūichi Fukuda
- Based on: Muse no Kagami
- Starring: Aya Hirano; Rino Sashihara; Nako Mizusawa; Narushi Ikeda; Moe Arai
- Release date: September 29, 2012 (Japan)
- Country: Japan
- Language: Japanese

Muse no Kagami (劇場版ミューズの鏡 マイプリティドール) is a 2012 Japanese film directed by Yūichi Fukuda. It is based on the Japanese television drama series of the same name.

== Cast ==
- Aya Hirano
- Rino Sashihara as Maki
- Nako Mizusawa
- Narushi Ikeda
- Moe Arai
