= Kumamoto =

Designated city in Kyushu, Japan

Kumamoto 熊本市
- Prefecture capital and Designated city
- Kumamoto City
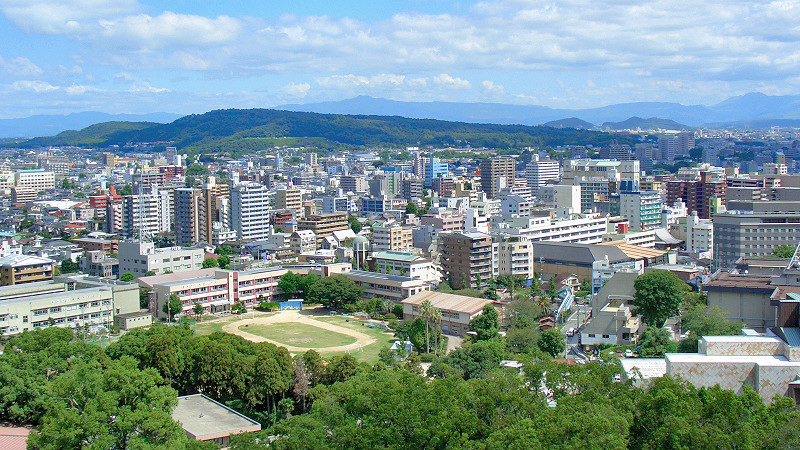
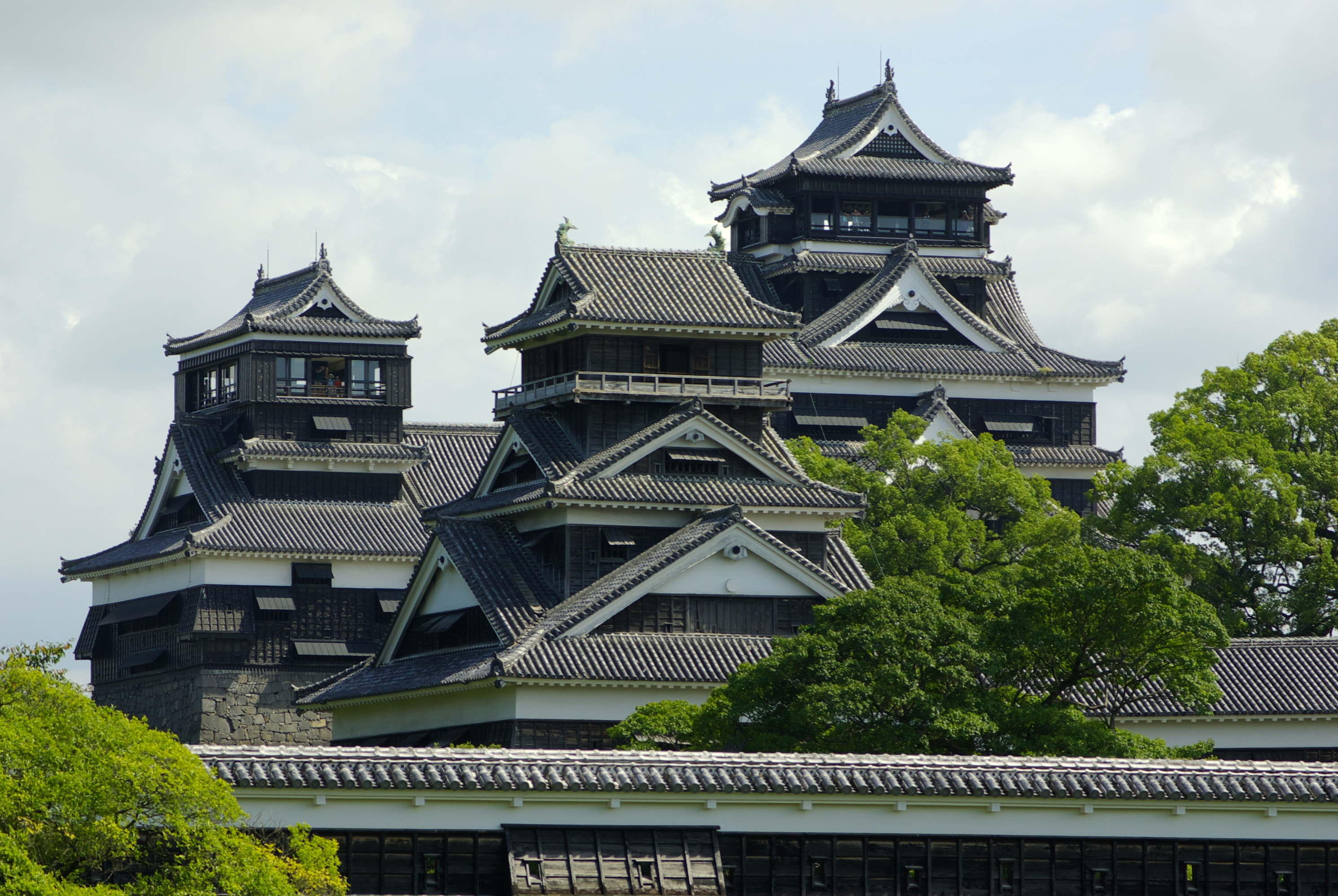
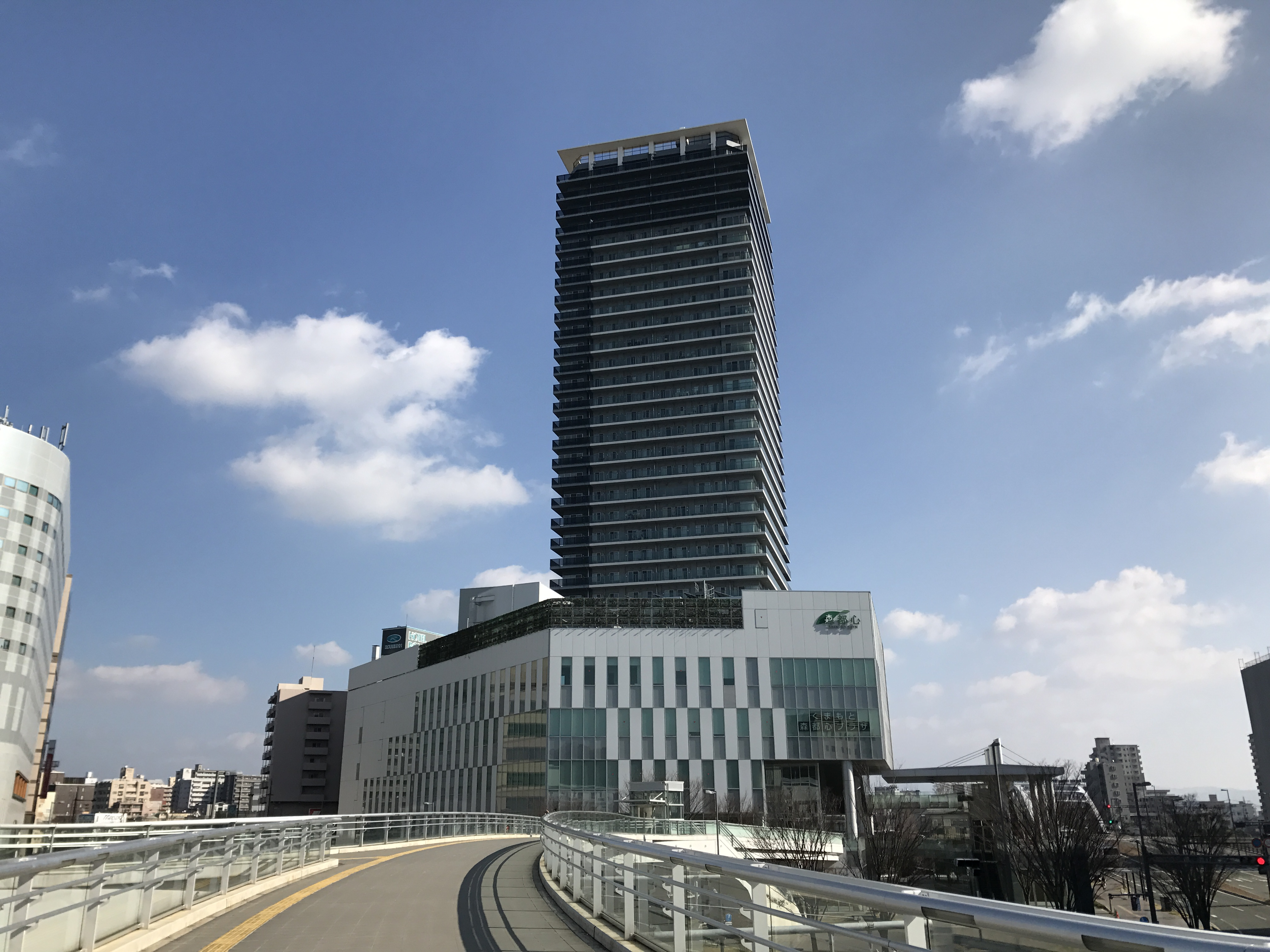
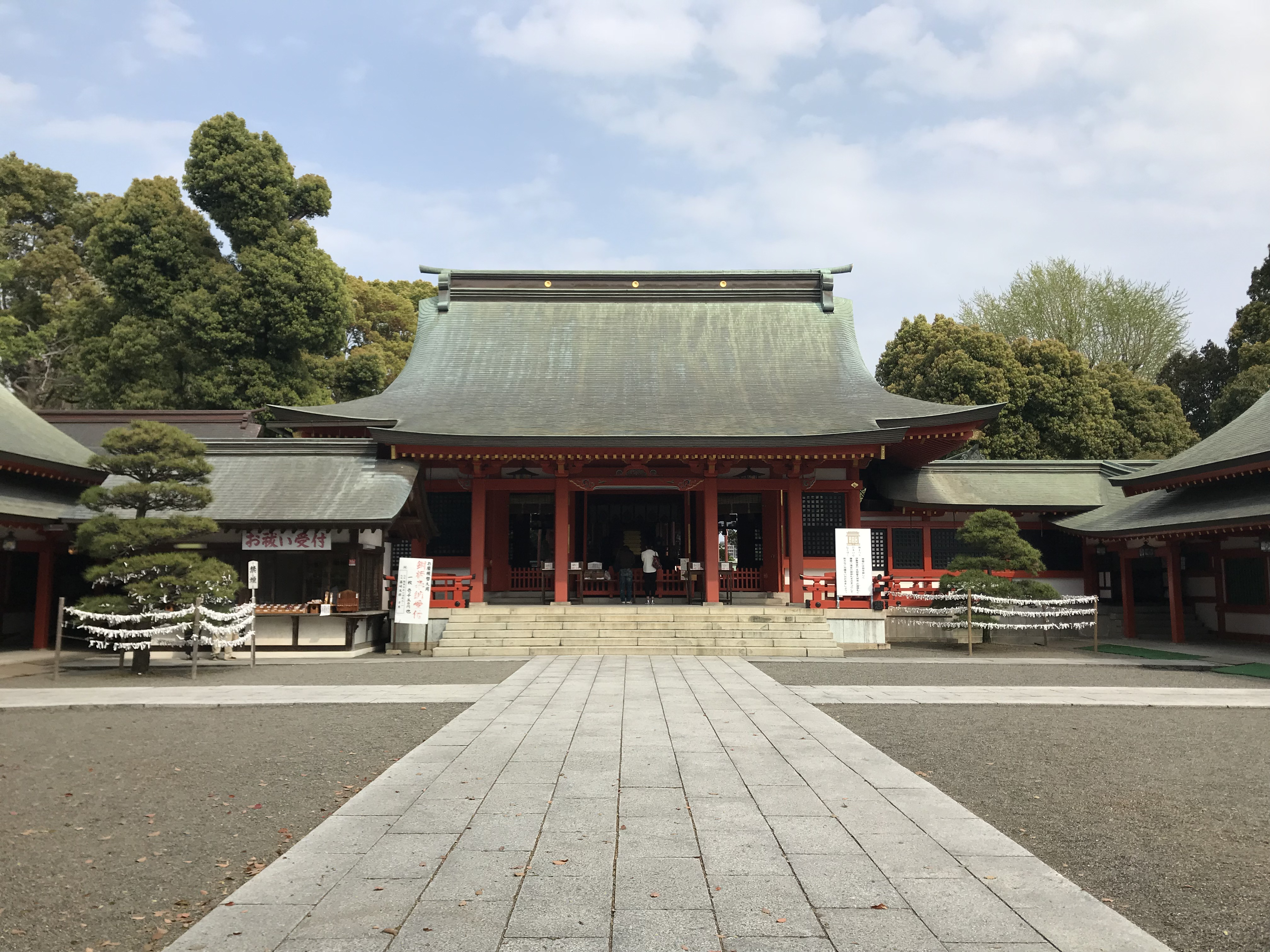
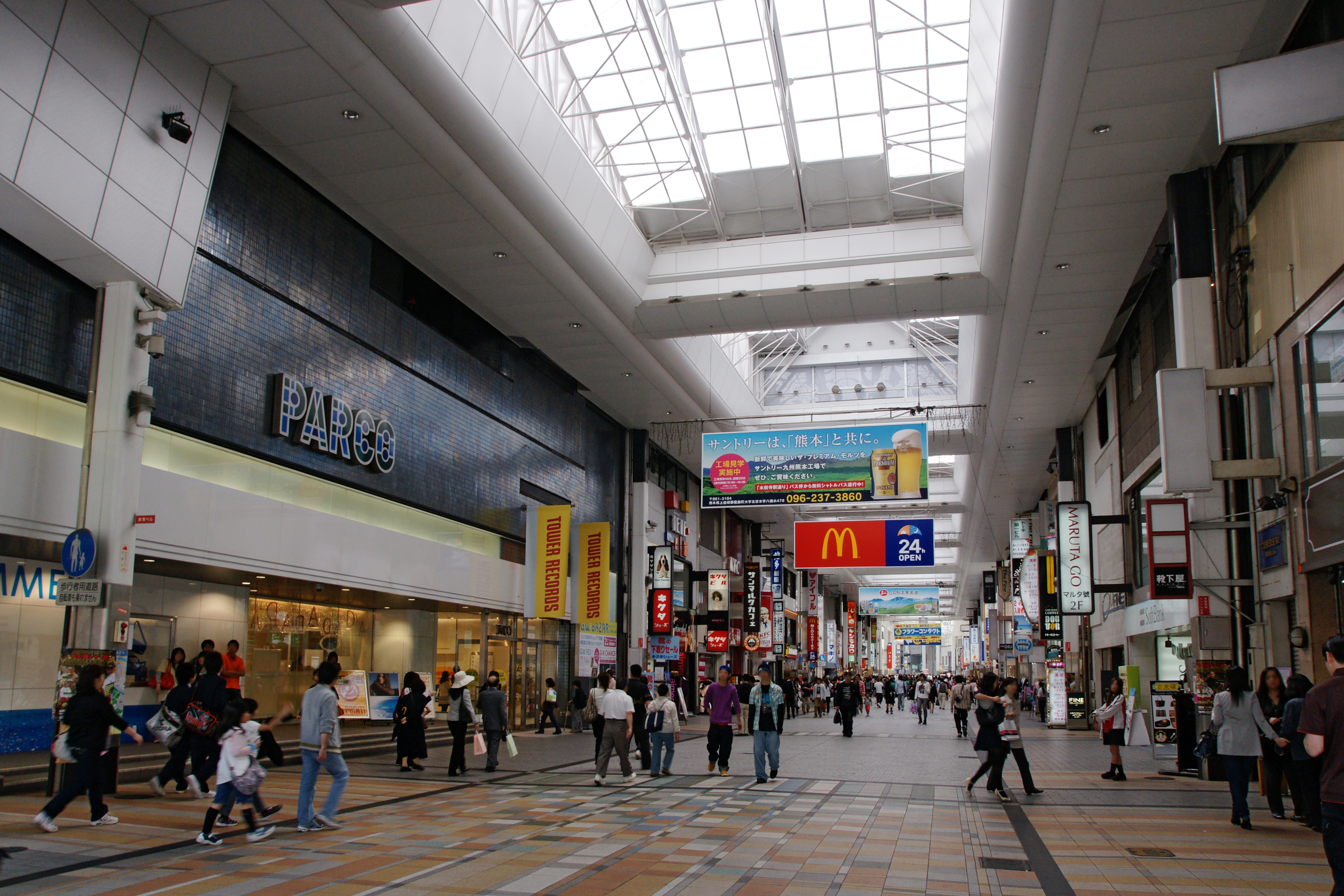
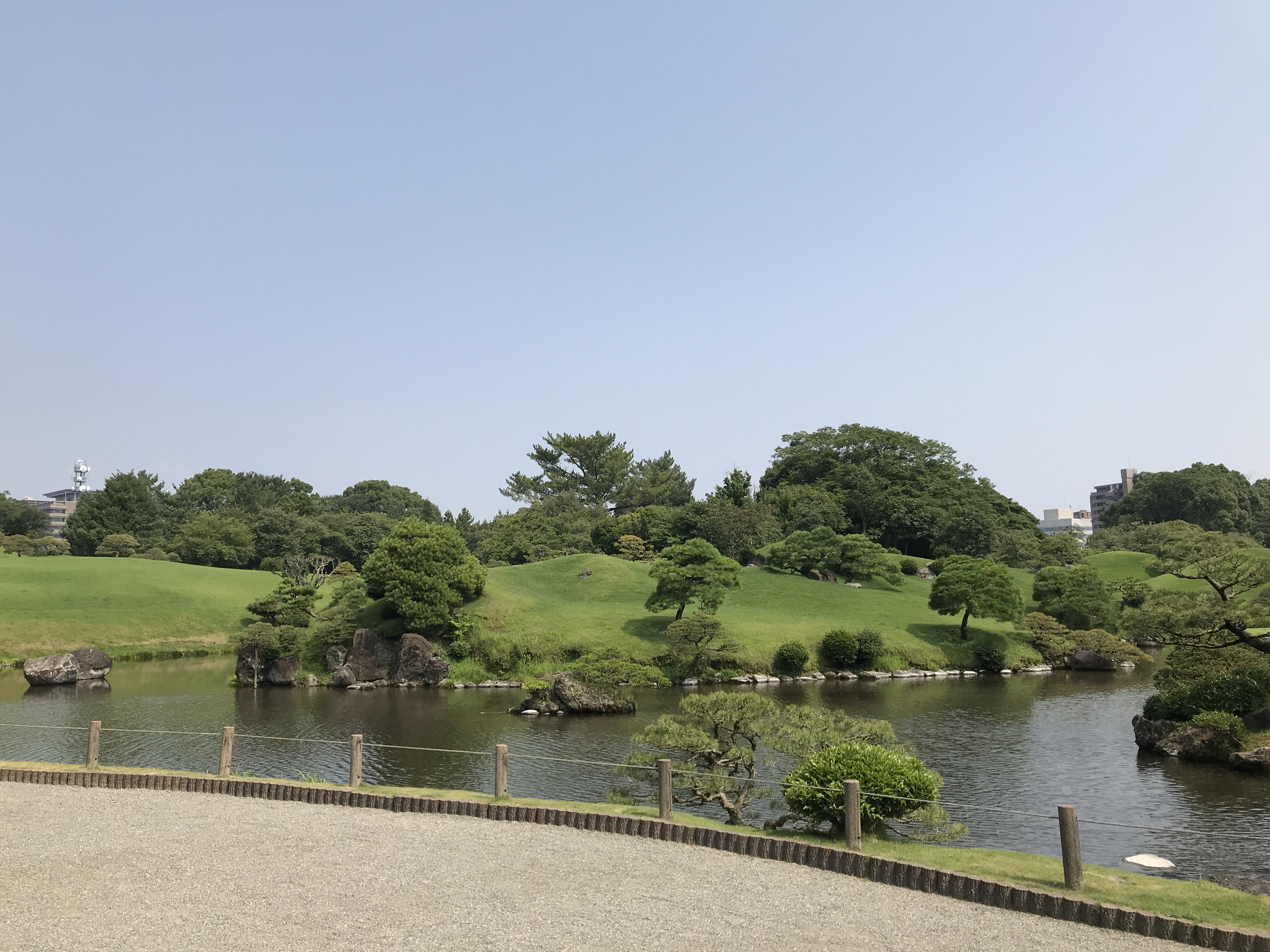
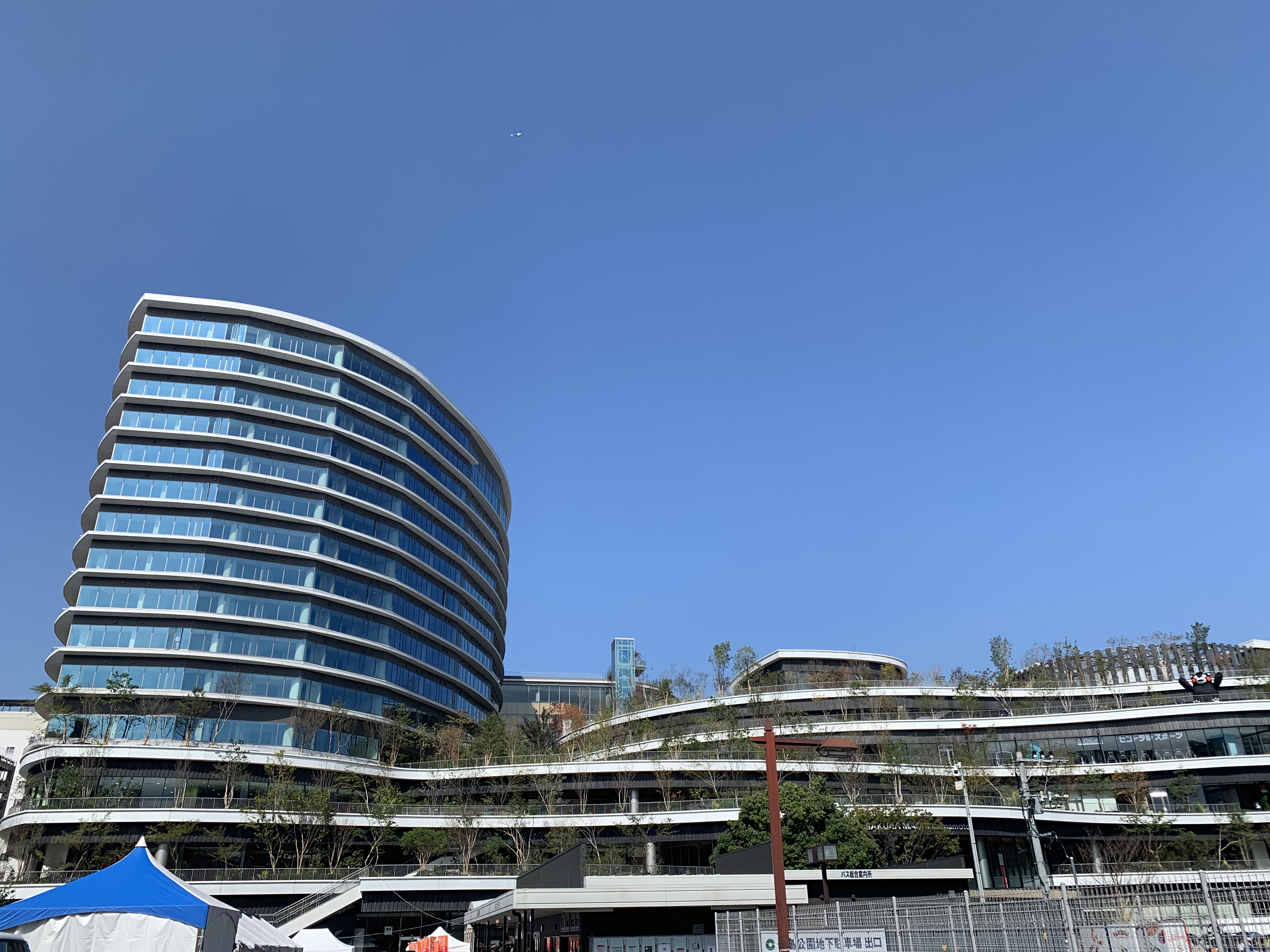
- Skyline view of Kumamoto City from Kumamoto Castle Kumamoto Castle Kumamoto Shintoshin Plaza Fujisaki Hachimangū Shimotori-Shintengai of Kumamoto City Suizenji Park Kumamoto Sakuramachi Bus Terminal

- Flag Emblem
- Nickname: The Heart of Kyushu
- Location of Kumamoto in Kumamoto Prefecture

- Location in Japan
- Coordinates: 32°48′11″N 130°42′28″E
- Country: Japan
- Region: Kyushu
- Prefecture: Kumamoto Prefecture
- First official recorded: 558 AD
- City Settled: April 1, 1889

Government
  - Mayor: Kazufumi Ōnishi

Area
  - Total: 390.32 km^{2} (150.70 sq mi)

Population (January 1, 2025)
  - Total: 737,543
  - Density: 1,889.6/km^{2} (4,894.0/sq mi)
- Time zone: UTC+09:00 (JST)
- Climate: Cfa
- Website: www.city.kumamoto.jp
- Symbols
- Bird: Great tit
- Flower: Camellia
- Tree: Ginkgo

Kumamoto (熊本市, Kumamoto-shi; Japanese pronunciation: [kɯ̈̀.mä́.mó̞.tó̞(.ɕì)]) is the capital city of Kumamoto Prefecture on the island of Kyushu, Japan. As of June 1, 2019, the city had an estimated population of 738,907 and a population density of 1,893 people per km^{2}. The total area is 390.32 km^{2}.

Greater Kumamoto (熊本都市圏) had a population of 1,461,000, as of the 2000 census. As of 2010, Kumamoto Metropolitan Employment Area has a GDP of US$39.8 billion. It is not considered part of the Fukuoka–Kitakyushu metropolitan area, despite their shared border. The city was designated on April 1, 2012, by government ordinance.

== History ==
=== Early modern period ===
==== Shokuhō period ====
Katō Kiyomasa, a contemporary of Toyotomi Hideyoshi, was made daimyō of half of the (old) administrative region of Higo in 1588. Afterwards, Kiyomasa built Kumamoto Castle. Due to its many innovative defensive designs, Kumamoto Castle was considered impenetrable, and Kiyomasa enjoyed a reputation as one of the finest castle-builders in Japanese history.

==== Edo period ====
After Kiyomasa died in 1611, his son, Tadahiro, succeeded him. In 1632, Tadahiro was removed by Tokugawa Iemitsu and replaced with the Hosokawa clan. Hosokawa Tadatoshi, the third lord of Kumamoto, was the patron of the artist and swordsman Miyamoto Musashi.

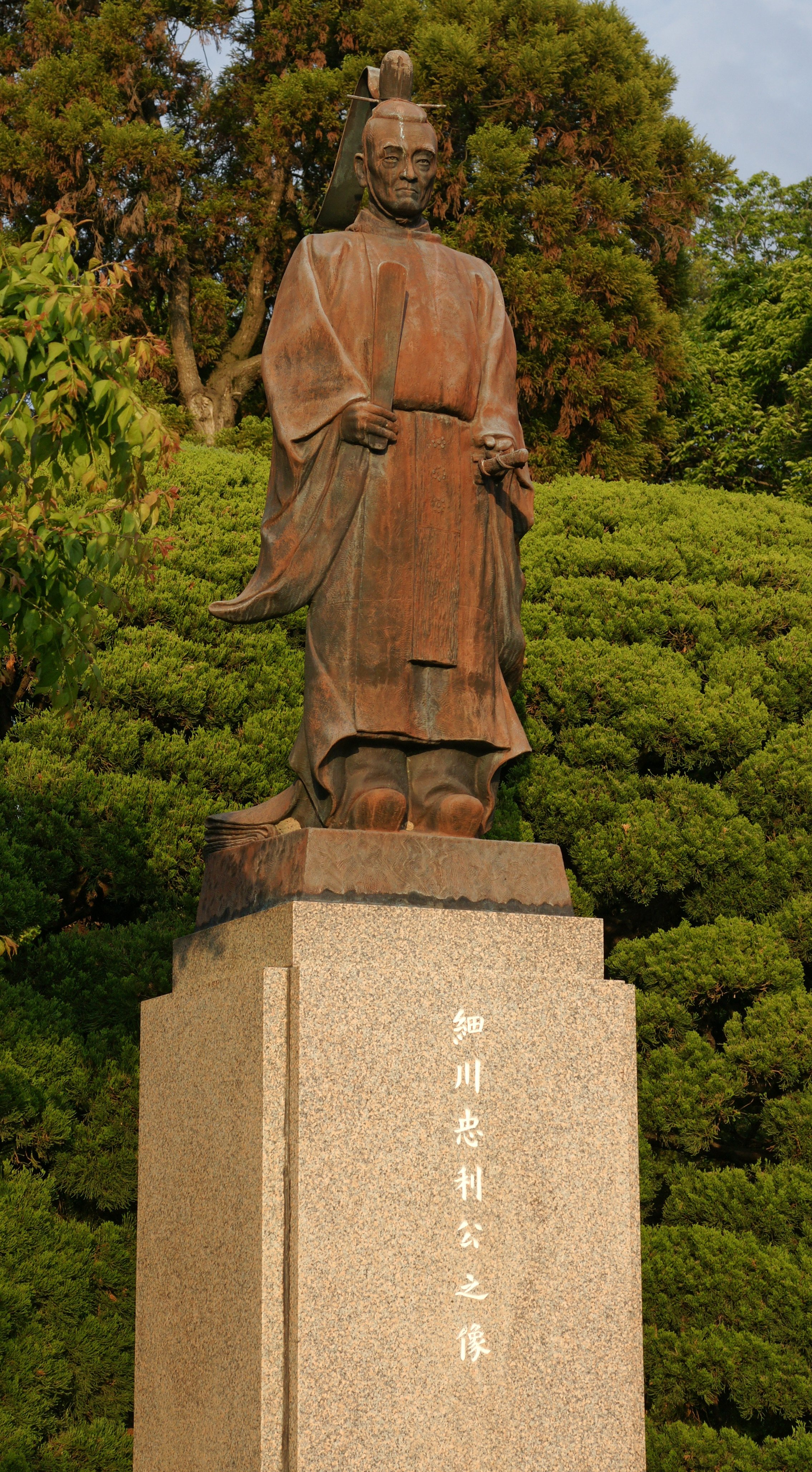
Statue of Hosokawa Tadatoshi within Suizen-ji Jōju-en

Mon of Miyamoto Musashi, born in Ōhara-chō province of Mimasaka

=== Late modern period ===
==== Meiji period ====
The current administrative body of the City of Kumamoto was founded on April 1, 1889.

==== Showa period ====
On July 1, 1945, near the end of World War II, Kumamoto was bombed in an Allied air raid that destroyed one square mile, which was 20% of the city's area.

=== Contemporary history ===
==== After World War II ====
After the war, the Japanese Buddhist monk Nichidatsu Fujii decided to construct a Peace Pagoda atop Mount Hanaoka in the city to commemorate all those lost in war and to promote peace. Inaugurated in 1954, it was the first of over 80 Peace Pagodas built by Fujii and his followers all over the world.

==== Heisei period ====
On February 1, 1991, the towns of Akita, Kawachi, Tenmei, and Hokubu (all from Hōtaku District) were merged into Kumamoto. On October 6, 2008, the town of Tomiai (from Shimomashiki District) was merged into Kumamoto. On March 23, 2010, the town of Jōnan (also from Shimomashiki District) and the town of Ueki (from Kamoto District) were merged into Kumamoto.

A series of earthquakes struck the area beginning April 14, 2016, including a tremor with moment magnitude 7.1 early in the morning of April 16, 2016.

== Geography ==
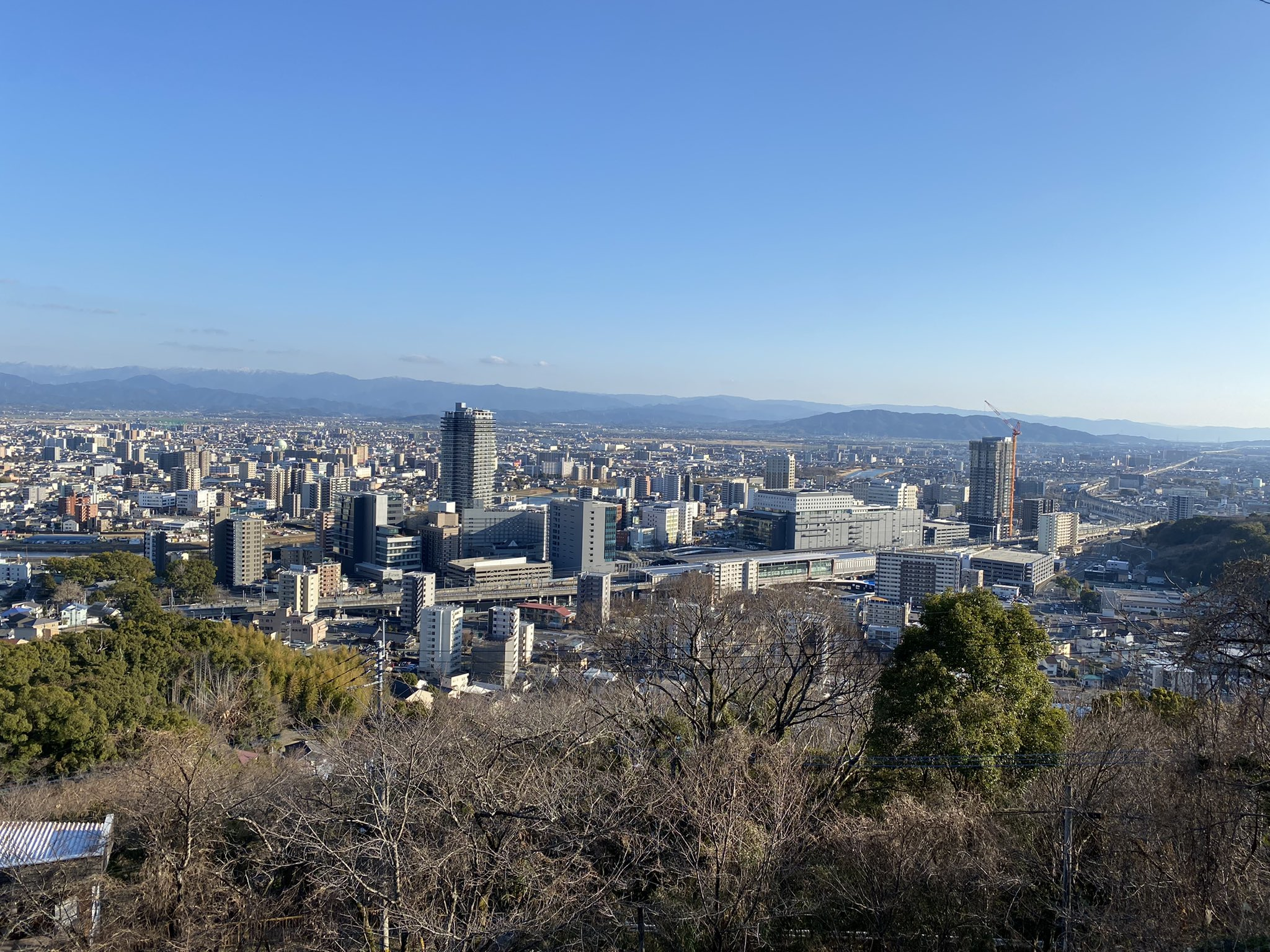
Downtown of Kumamoto

=== Climate ===
Kumamoto has a humid subtropical climate (Köppen climate classification Cfa) with hot, humid summers and cool winters. There is significant precipitation throughout the year, especially during June and July. The average annual temperature in Kumamoto is 17.2 °C (63.0 °F). The average annual rainfall is 2,007.0 mm (79.02 in) with June as the wettest month. The temperatures are highest on average in August, at around 28.4 °C (83.1 °F), and lowest in January, at around 6.0 °C (42.8 °F). The highest temperature ever recorded in Kumamoto was 40.3 °C (104.5 °F) on 3 August 2026; the coldest temperature ever recorded was −9.2 °C (15.4 °F) on 26 January 1904 and 11 February 1929.

Climate data for Kumamoto (1991−2020 normals, extremes 1890−present)
| Month | Jan | Feb | Mar | Apr | May | Jun | Jul | Aug | Sep | Oct | Nov | Dec | Year |
|---|---|---|---|---|---|---|---|---|---|---|---|---|---|
| Record high °C (°F) | 22.5 (72.5) | 26.4 (79.5) | 27.4 (81.3) | 30.7 (87.3) | 34.4 (93.9) | 36.1 (97.0) | 38.8 (101.8) | 40.3 (104.5) | 37.6 (99.7) | 34.7 (94.5) | 30.0 (86.0) | 24.6 (76.3) | 40.3 (104.5) |
| Mean maximum °C (°F) | 16.9 (62.4) | 19.5 (67.1) | 23.0 (73.4) | 27.5 (81.5) | 31.3 (88.3) | 32.8 (91.0) | 35.9 (96.6) | 36.6 (97.9) | 34.6 (94.3) | 30.4 (86.7) | 24.7 (76.5) | 19.4 (66.9) | 36.8 (98.2) |
| Mean daily maximum °C (°F) | 10.7 (51.3) | 12.4 (54.3) | 16.1 (61.0) | 21.4 (70.5) | 26.0 (78.8) | 28.1 (82.6) | 31.8 (89.2) | 33.3 (91.9) | 30.1 (86.2) | 25.0 (77.0) | 18.8 (65.8) | 12.9 (55.2) | 22.2 (72.0) |
| Daily mean °C (°F) | 6.0 (42.8) | 7.4 (45.3) | 10.9 (51.6) | 15.8 (60.4) | 20.5 (68.9) | 23.7 (74.7) | 27.5 (81.5) | 28.4 (83.1) | 25.2 (77.4) | 19.6 (67.3) | 13.5 (56.3) | 8.0 (46.4) | 17.2 (63.0) |
| Mean daily minimum °C (°F) | 1.6 (34.9) | 2.6 (36.7) | 5.9 (42.6) | 10.6 (51.1) | 15.6 (60.1) | 20.2 (68.4) | 24.2 (75.6) | 24.8 (76.6) | 21.2 (70.2) | 14.9 (58.8) | 8.8 (47.8) | 3.4 (38.1) | 12.8 (55.0) |
| Mean minimum °C (°F) | −3.6 (25.5) | −3.0 (26.6) | −0.7 (30.7) | 3.3 (37.9) | 9.9 (49.8) | 15.7 (60.3) | 20.8 (69.4) | 21.4 (70.5) | 15.6 (60.1) | 8.4 (47.1) | 2.0 (35.6) | −2.4 (27.7) | −4.3 (24.3) |
| Record low °C (°F) | −9.2 (15.4) | −9.2 (15.4) | −6.9 (19.6) | −2.5 (27.5) | 1.3 (34.3) | 7.1 (44.8) | 14.3 (57.7) | 15.3 (59.5) | 6.7 (44.1) | 0.5 (32.9) | −3.8 (25.2) | −7.9 (17.8) | −9.2 (15.4) |
| Average precipitation mm (inches) | 57.2 (2.25) | 83.2 (3.28) | 124.8 (4.91) | 144.9 (5.70) | 160.9 (6.33) | 448.5 (17.66) | 386.8 (15.23) | 195.4 (7.69) | 172.6 (6.80) | 87.1 (3.43) | 84.4 (3.32) | 61.2 (2.41) | 2,007 (79.02) |
| Average snowfall cm (inches) | 1 (0.4) | 0 (0) | 0 (0) | 0 (0) | 0 (0) | 0 (0) | 0 (0) | 0 (0) | 0 (0) | 0 (0) | 0 (0) | 0 (0) | 1 (0.4) |
| Average precipitation days (≥ 0.5 mm) | 8.1 | 9.0 | 11.4 | 10.7 | 10.4 | 15.2 | 13.3 | 11.3 | 10.4 | 7.2 | 8.3 | 8.3 | 123.5 |
| Average relative humidity (%) | 70 | 67 | 66 | 65 | 67 | 76 | 76 | 72 | 71 | 69 | 72 | 71 | 70 |
| Mean monthly sunshine hours | 133.0 | 141.1 | 169.6 | 184.0 | 194.3 | 130.8 | 176.7 | 206.0 | 176.4 | 187.1 | 153.7 | 143.4 | 1,996.1 |
Source: Japan Meteorological Agency

=== Area ===
Map showing Kumamoto Metropolitan Employment Area

==== Wards ====
Since April 1, 2012, Kumamoto has five wards (ku):

Wards of Kumamoto
| | Place Name | | | Map of Kumamoto |
|---|---|---|---|---|
| | Rōmaji | Kanji | Color | |
| 1 | Kita-ku | 北区 | Blue | |
| 2 | Nishi-ku | 西区 | Yellow | |
| 3 | Chuo-ku | 中央区 (administrative center) | Purple | |
| 4 | Higashi-ku | 東区 | Red | |
| 5 | Minami-ku | 南区 | Green | |

=== Surrounding municipalities ===
Kumamoto Prefecture

- Gyokuto
- Kashima
- Kikuchi
- Kikuyō
- Kōsa
- Kōshi
- Mashiki
- Mifune
- Tamana
- Uki
- Uto
- Yamaga

=== Demographics ===
Kumamoto prefecture population pyramid in 2020

Per Japanese census data, the population of Kumamoto in 2020 is 738,865 people. Kumamoto has been conducting censuses since 1920.

Historical population

| Year | Pop. | ±% |
|---|---|---|
| 1920 | 267,466 | — |
| 1925 | 290,729 | +8.7% |
| 1930 | 312,013 | +7.3% |
| 1935 | 329,225 | +5.5% |
| 1940 | 321,622 | −2.3% |
| 1945 | 389,649 | +21.2% |
| 1950 | 413,497 | +6.1% |
| 1955 | 454,514 | +9.9% |
| 1960 | 474,859 | +4.5% |
| 1965 | 502,463 | +5.8% |
| 1970 | 534,228 | +6.3% |

| Year | Pop. | ±% |
|---|---|---|
| 1975 | 574,299 | +7.5% |
| 1980 | 619,236 | +7.8% |
| 1985 | 654,348 | +5.7% |
| 1990 | 680,765 | +4.0% |
| 1995 | 708,097 | +4.0% |
| 2000 | 720,816 | +1.8% |
| 2005 | 727,978 | +1.0% |
| 2010 | 734,294 | +0.9% |
| 2015 | 740,822 | +0.9% |
| 2020 | 738,865 | −0.3% |

Kumamoto population statistics

== Government ==
Kazufumi Ōnishi has been the city's mayor since December 2014.

=== Working mother incident ===
In November 2017, Kumamoto politician Yuka Ogata was forced to leave the Kumamoto municipal assembly because she had brought her baby. The incident was reported by international media as an example of the challenges facing women in Japan.

== Transportation ==
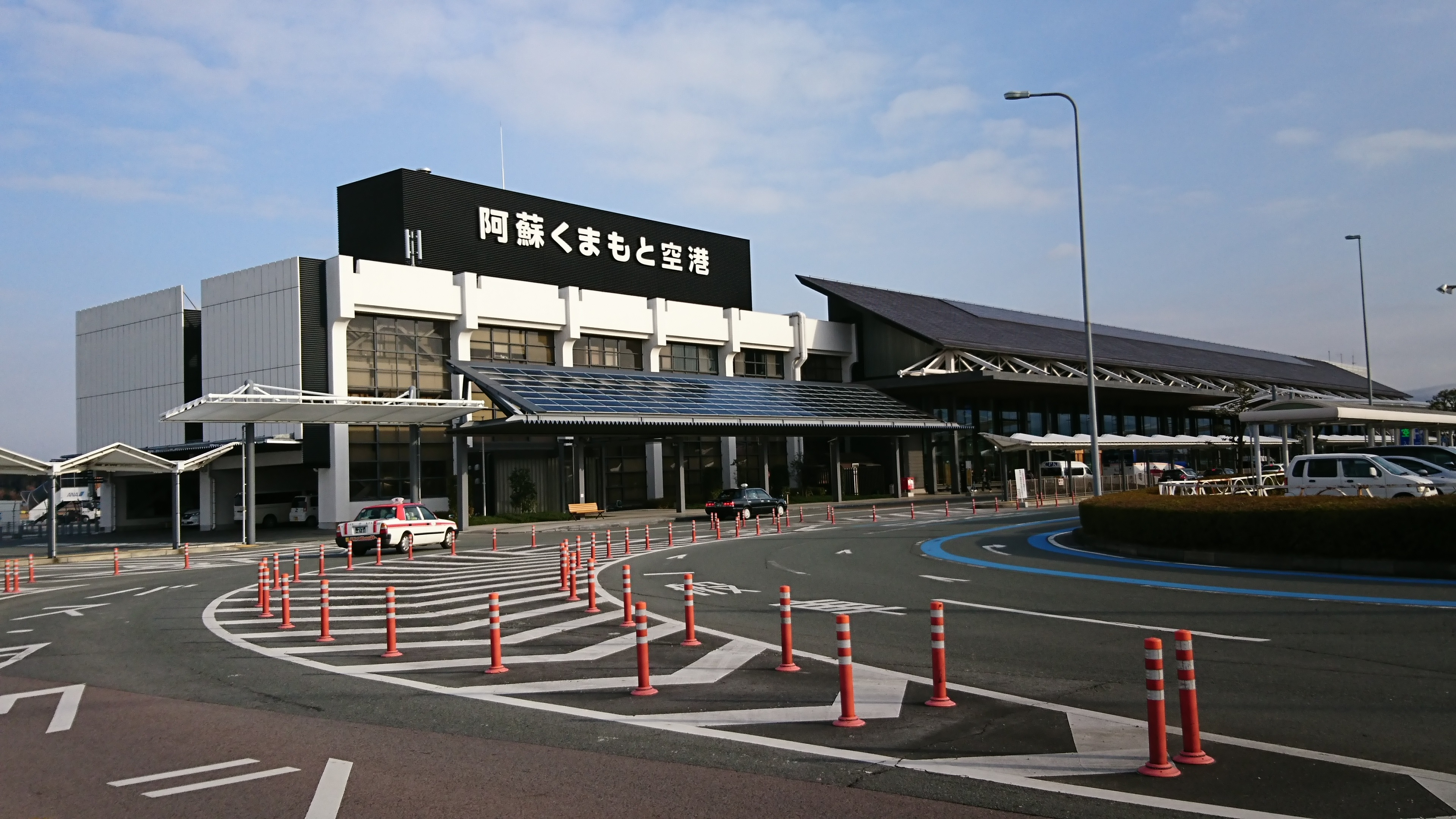
Kumamoto Airport

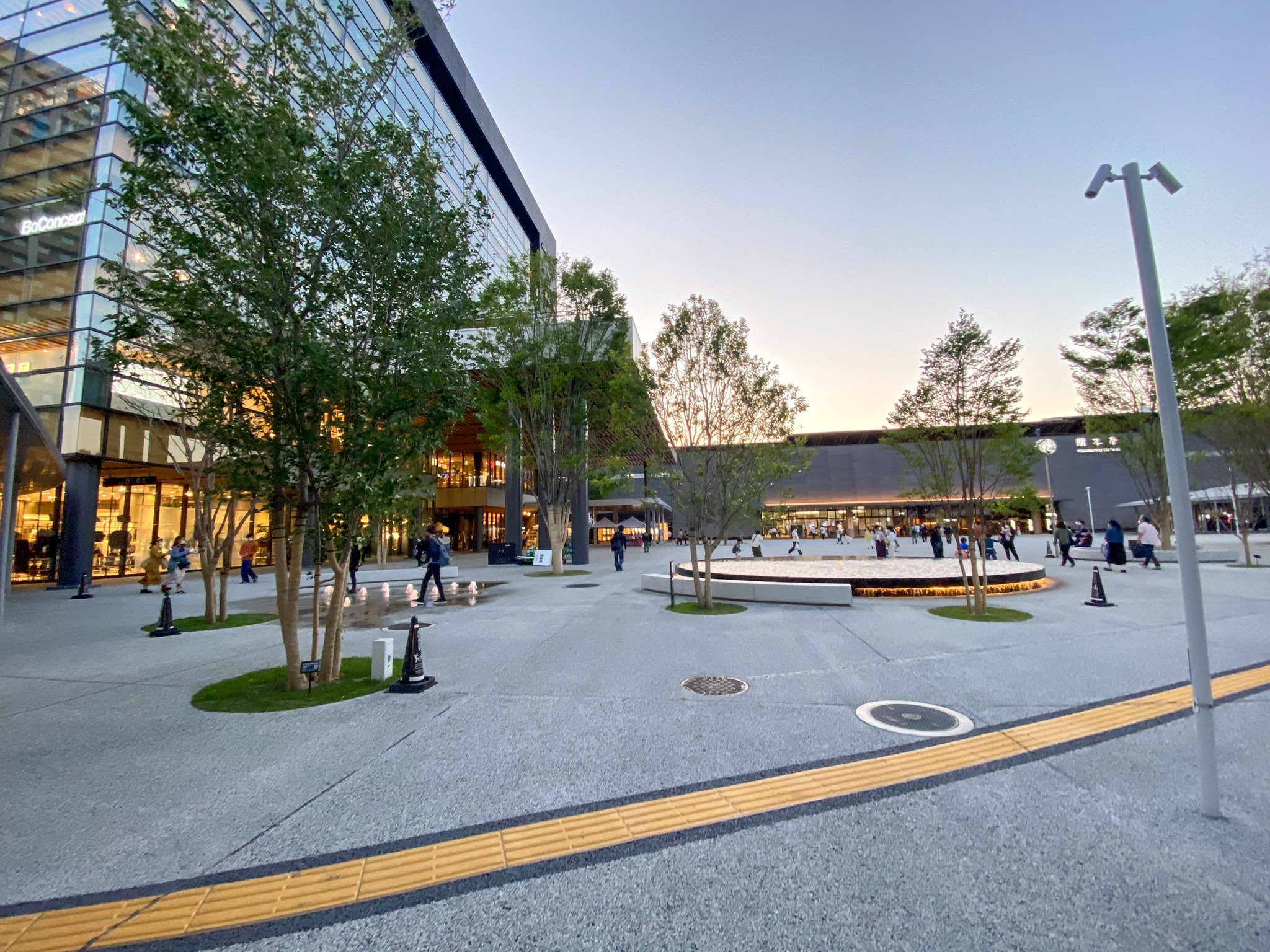
Kumamoto Station

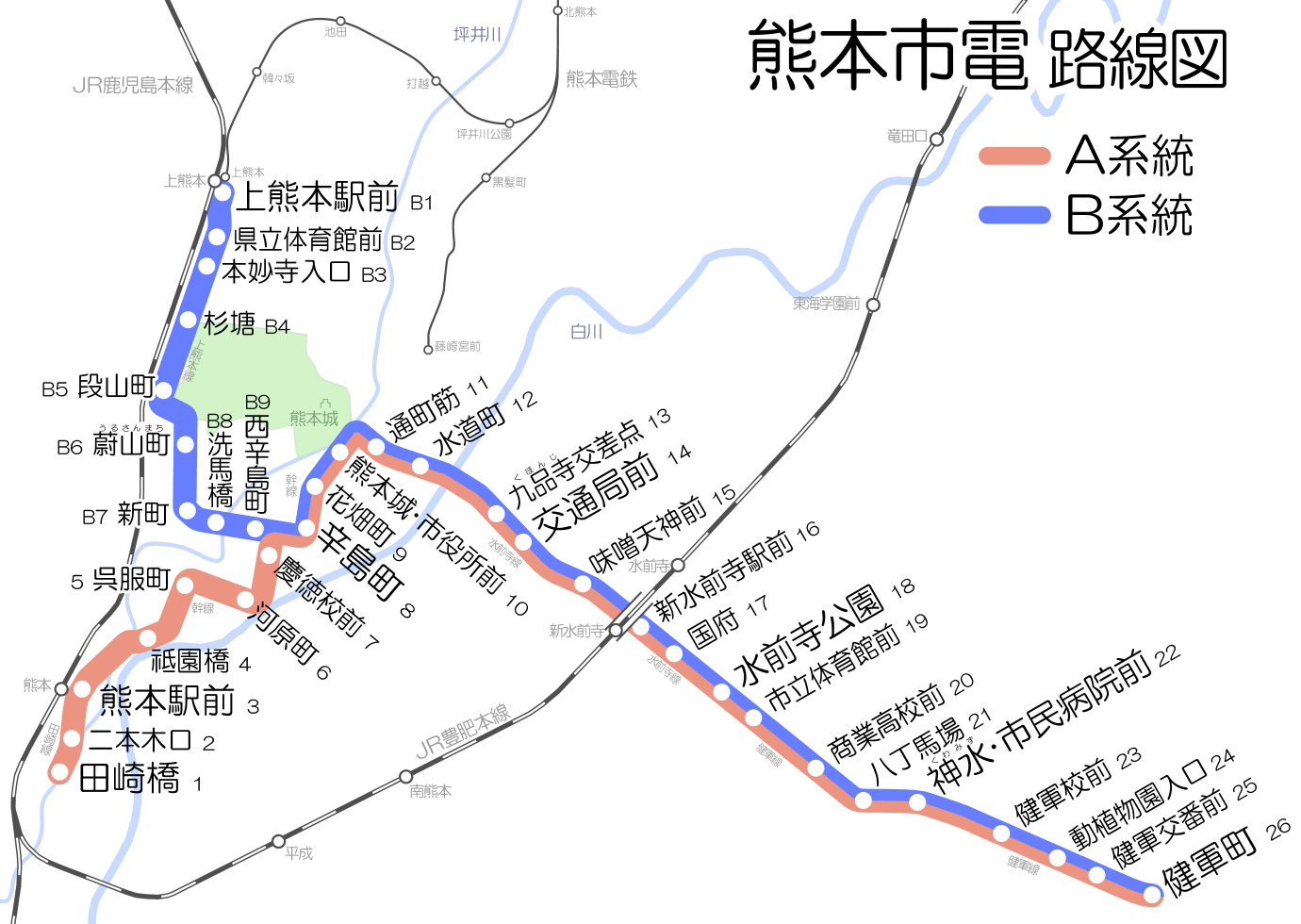
Kumamoto City Transportation Bureau

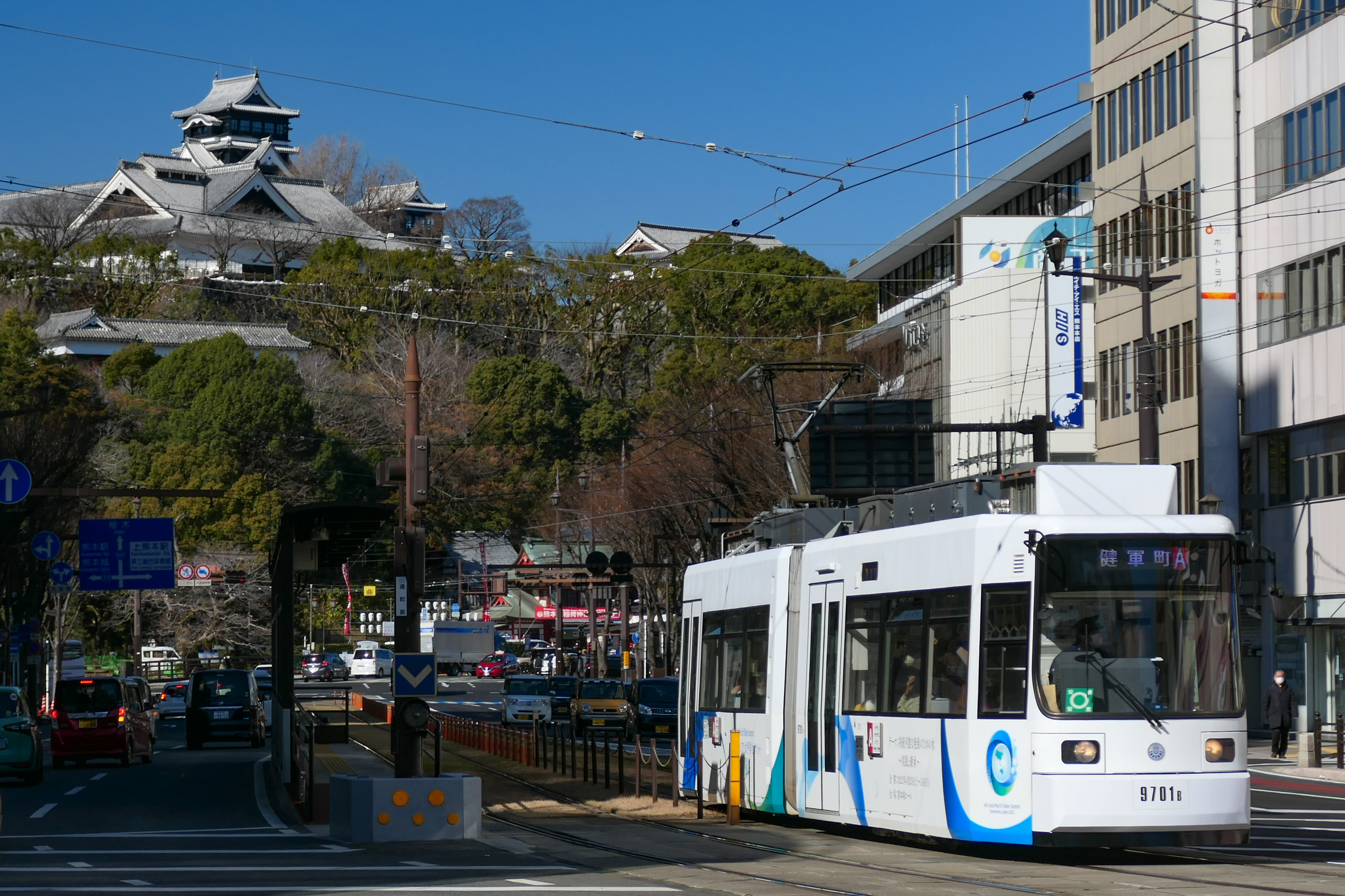
Kumamoto city tram

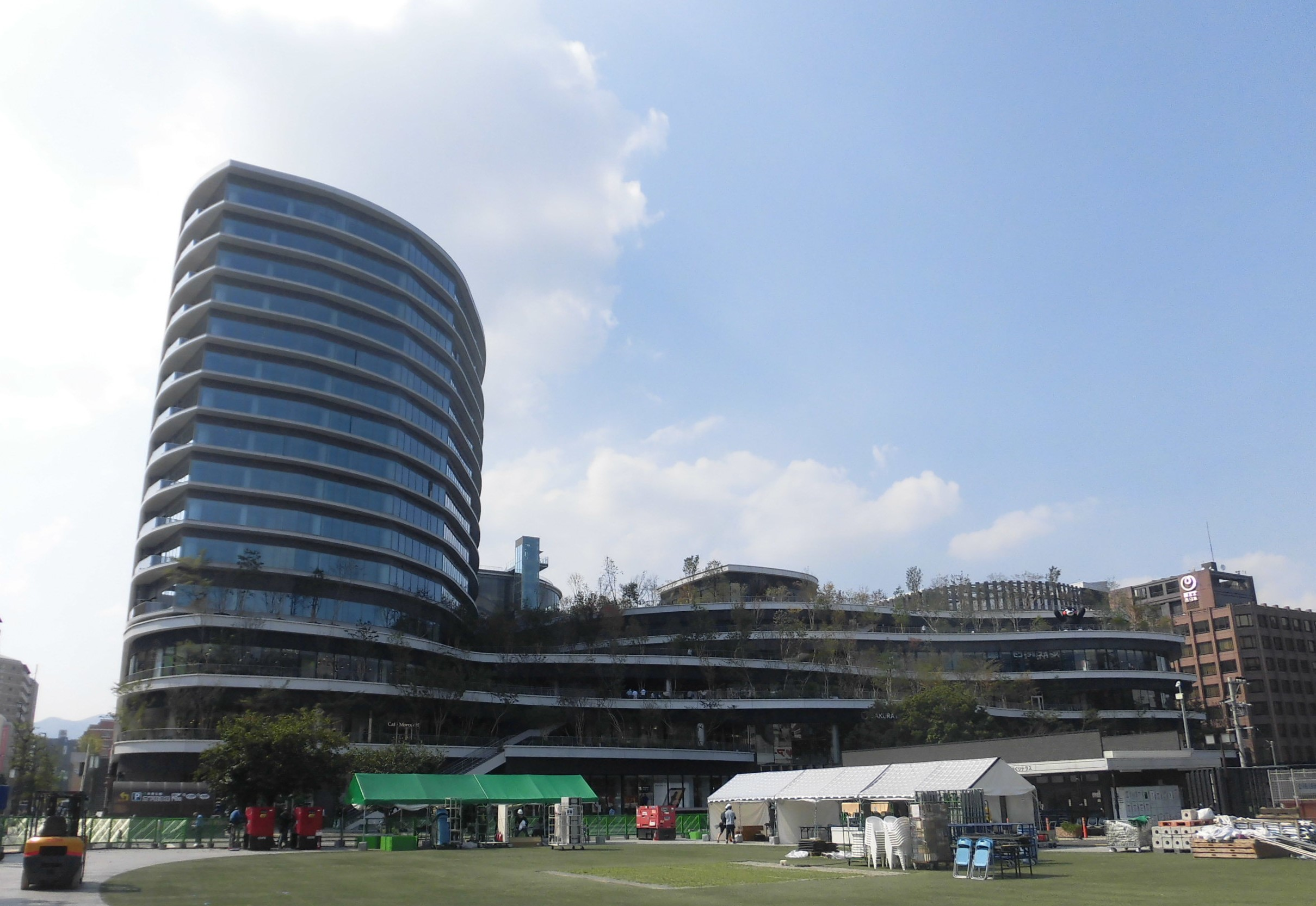
Kumamoto Sakuramachi Bus Terminal

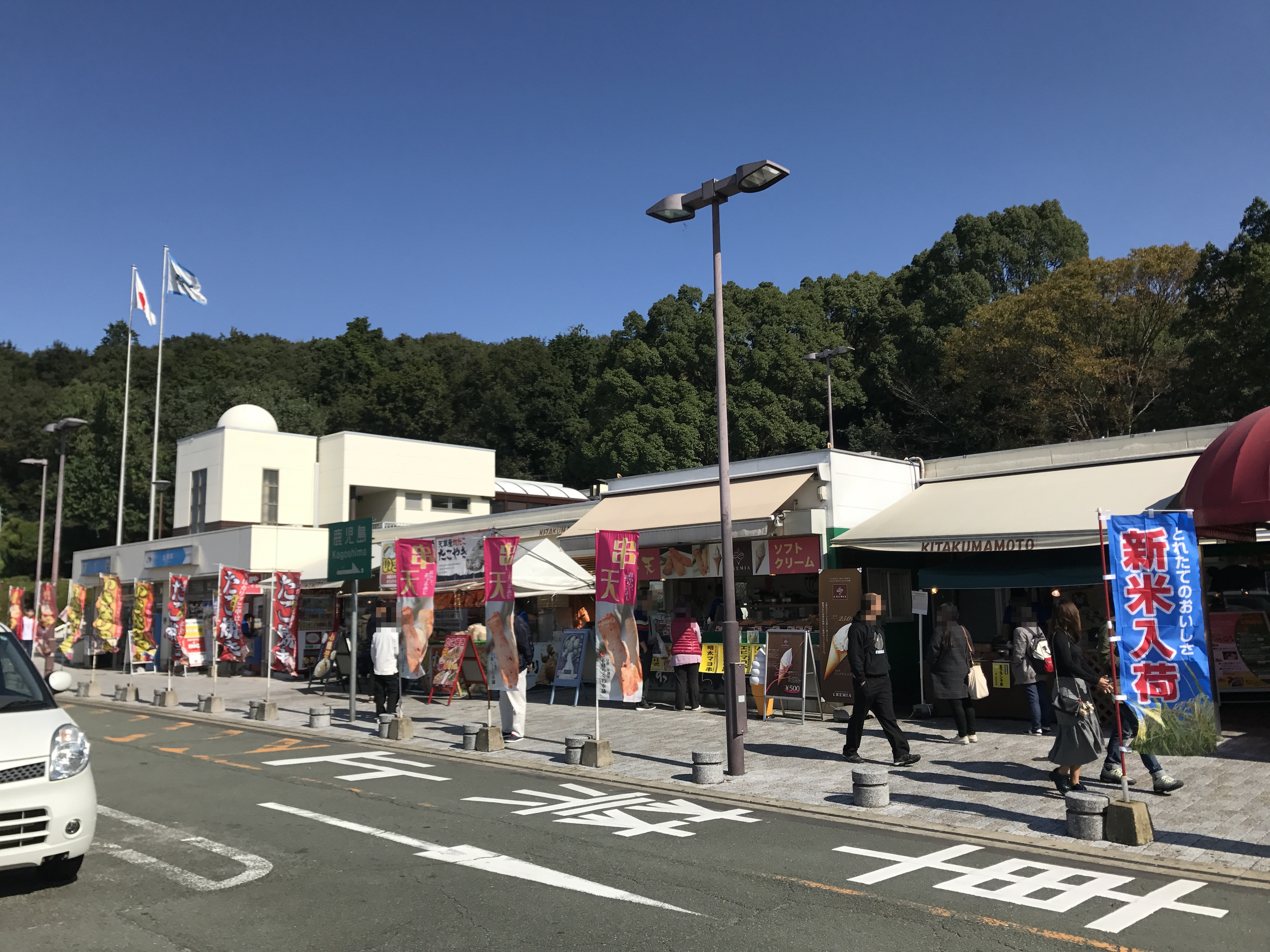
Kitakumamoto Service Area

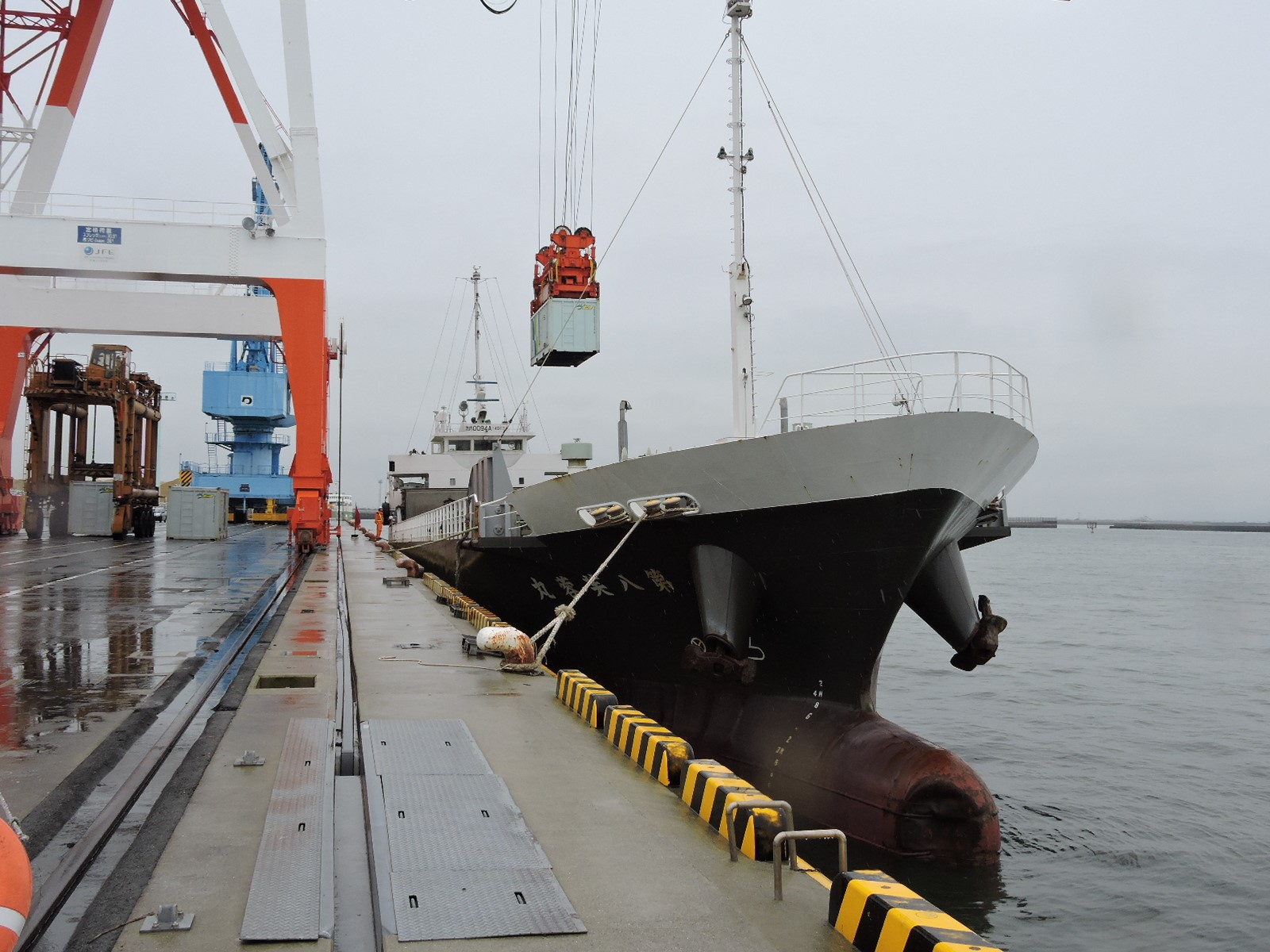
Port of Kumamoto

Local public transport is provided by the Kumamoto City Transportation Bureau.

=== Airways ===
==== Airports ====
Kumamoto Airport is located in nearby Mashiki.

=== Railways ===
==== High-speed rail ====
On March 12, 2011, work on the shinkansen (high-speed bullet train) network was completed, establishing a direct high-speed rail link to Tokyo via Fukuoka's Hakata station.

JR Kyushu

- Kyushu Shinkansen: Kumamoto Station -

==== Conventional lines ====
The JR Kumamoto station provides rail links to Japan's extensive rail network.

JR Kyushu

- Kagoshima Main Line: Tabaruzaka - Ueki - Nishizato - Sōjōdaigakumae - Kami-Kumamoto - Kumamoto - Nishi-Kumamoto - Kawashiri - Tomiai -
- Hōhi Main Line: Kumamoto - Heisei - Minami-Kumamoto - Shin-Suizenji - Suizenji - Tōkai-Gakuen-mae - Tatsutaguchi - Musashizuka - Hikarinomori -

Kumamoto Electric Railway

- Kikuchi Line: Kami-Kumamoto - Kankanzaka - Ikeda Station - Uchigoshi - Tsuboigawa-kōen - Kita-Kumamoto - Kamei - Hakenomiya - Horikawa -
- Fujisaki Line: Kita-Kumamoto - Kurokamimachi - Fujisakigū-mae

=== Tramways ===
Trams run to a few suburbs near the downtown area.

Kumamoto City Transportation Bureau

=== Bus ===
A large bus terminus, called the Kotsu Centre, provides access to both local and intercity destinations.

=== Taxi ===
Several local taxi companies serve the Kumamoto metropolitan area and are the only 24-hour public transport in the city.

=== Roads ===
==== Expressways ====
- Kyushu Expressway

==== Japan National Routes ====
- Japan National Route 3
- Japan National Route 57
- Japan National Route 208
- Japan National Route 218
- Japan National Route 219
- Japan National Route 266
- Japan National Route 387
- Japan National Route 443
- Japan National Route 445
- Japan National Route 501

=== Seaways ===
==== Seaports ====
- Port of Kumamoto

==== Ferry ====
- Kyusyu Shosen: Kumamoto - Shimabara
- Kumamoto-Ferry: Kumamoto - Shimabara
- Korean Marine Transport: Kumamoto - Busan

== Education ==
=== Universities ===
- Kumamoto Gakuen University
- Kumamoto University
- Kyūshū Lutheran College
- Prefectural University of Kumamoto
- Shokei College
- Shokei Gakuin University
- Sojo University
- Tokai University

== Landmarks ==
=== Kumamoto Castle ===
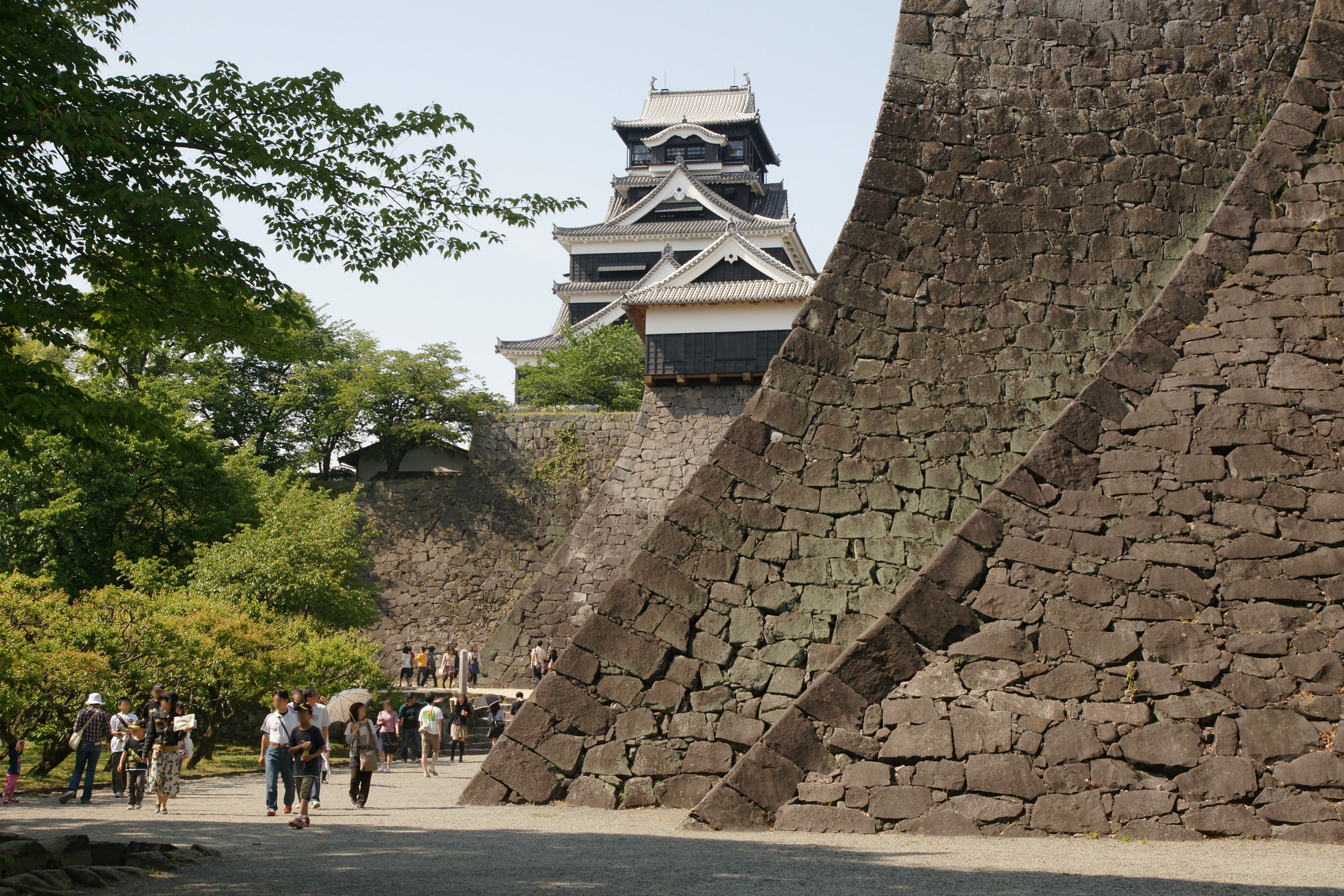
Kumamoto Castle

The city's most famous landmark is Kumamoto Castle, a large and once extremely well fortified Japanese castle. The donjon (castle central keep) is a concrete reconstruction built in the 1970s, but several ancillary wooden buildings from the original castle remain. The castle was assaulted during the Satsuma Rebellion and sacked and burned after a 53-day siege. It was during this time that the tradition of eating basashi (raw horse meat) originated. Basashi remains popular in Kumamoto and, to a lesser extent, elsewhere in Japan, although these days it is usually considered a delicacy.

Within the outer walls of Kumamoto Castle is the Hosokawa Gyobu-tei, the former residence of the Higo daimyō. This traditional wooden mansion has a fine Japanese garden located on its grounds.

=== Religious sites ===
The first of many peace pagodas around the world was erected by Japanese Buddhist monk Nichidatsu Fujii atop Mount Hanaoka beginning 1947. Inaugurated in 1954, it was the first of over 80 built by Fujii and his followers all over the world.

Kumamoto is also the location of Takahashi Inari Shrine and Fujisaki Hachimangū.

=== Suizenji area ===
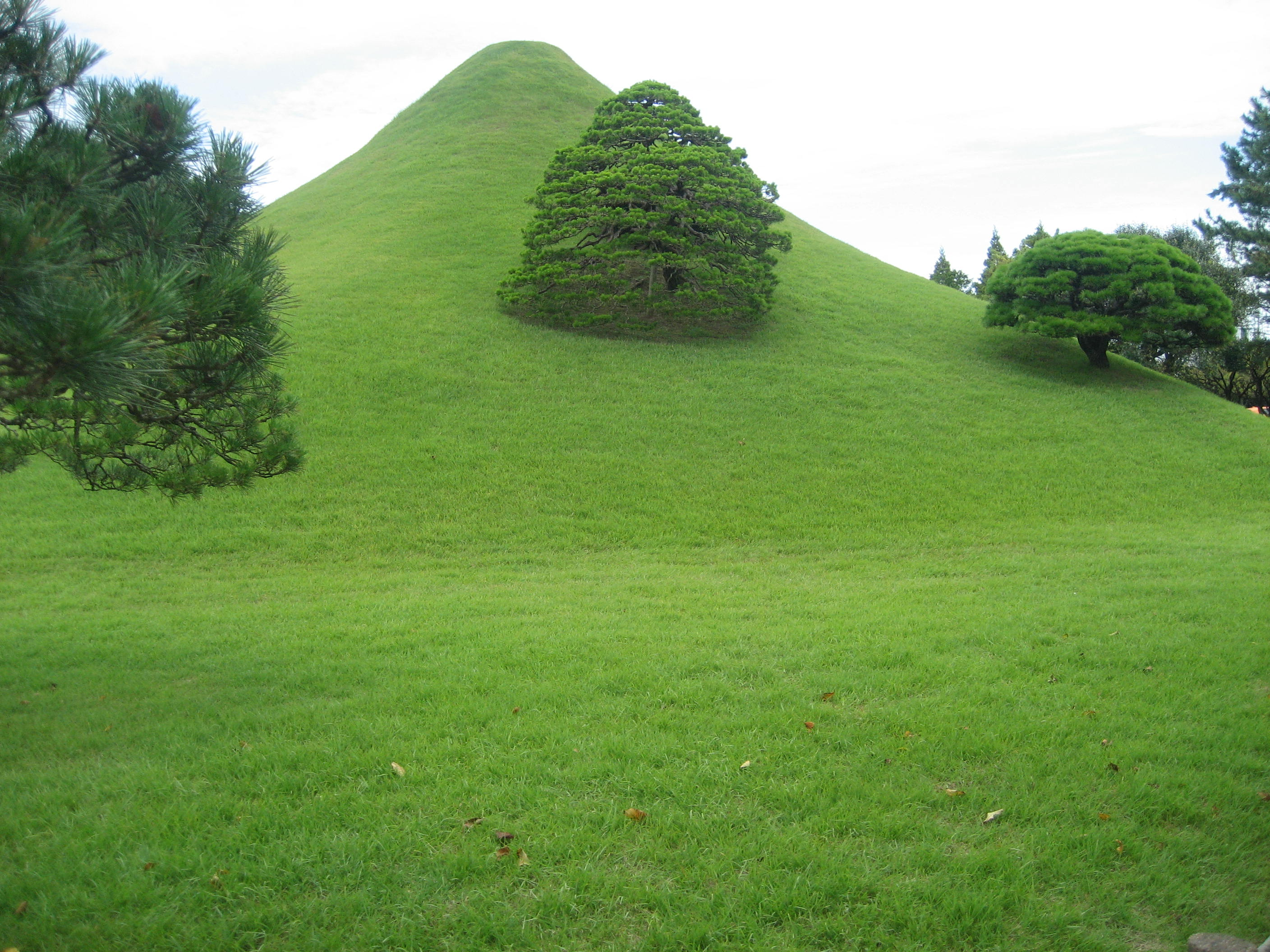
Suizenji jojuen garden

Kumamoto is home to Suizen-ji Jōju-en, a formal garden neighboring Suizenji Temple approximately 3 kilometers southeast of Kumamoto Castle. Suizenji Park is also home to the Suizenji Municipal Stadium, where the city's football team, Roasso Kumamoto, used to play regularly. The team now uses the larger KKWing Stadium in Higashi Ward.

=== Other notable sites ===
Miyamoto Musashi lived the last part of his life in Kumamoto. His tomb and the cave where he resided during his final years (known as Reigandō, or "spirit rock cave") are situated close by. He penned the famous Go Rin no Sho (The Book of Five Rings) whilst living here.

The downtown area has a commercial district centred on two shopping arcades, the Shimotori and Kamitori, which extend for several city blocks. The main department stores are located here along with a large number of smaller retailers, restaurants, and bars. Many local festivals are held in or near the arcades.

Cultural venues include the Kumamoto Prefectural Museum of Art and Kumamoto Prefectural Theater.

== Culture ==
=== Sports ===
==== Sports teams ====
Baseball

- Hinokuni Salamanders of the baseball Kyusyu Asia League are based in Kumamoto.

Football

- Roasso Kumamoto in J.League is the local football club.

Basketball

- Kumamoto Volters of the basketball B.League are based in Kumamoto.

Volleyball

- Forest Leaves Kumamoto of the Volleyball V.League (V2) are based in Kumamoto.
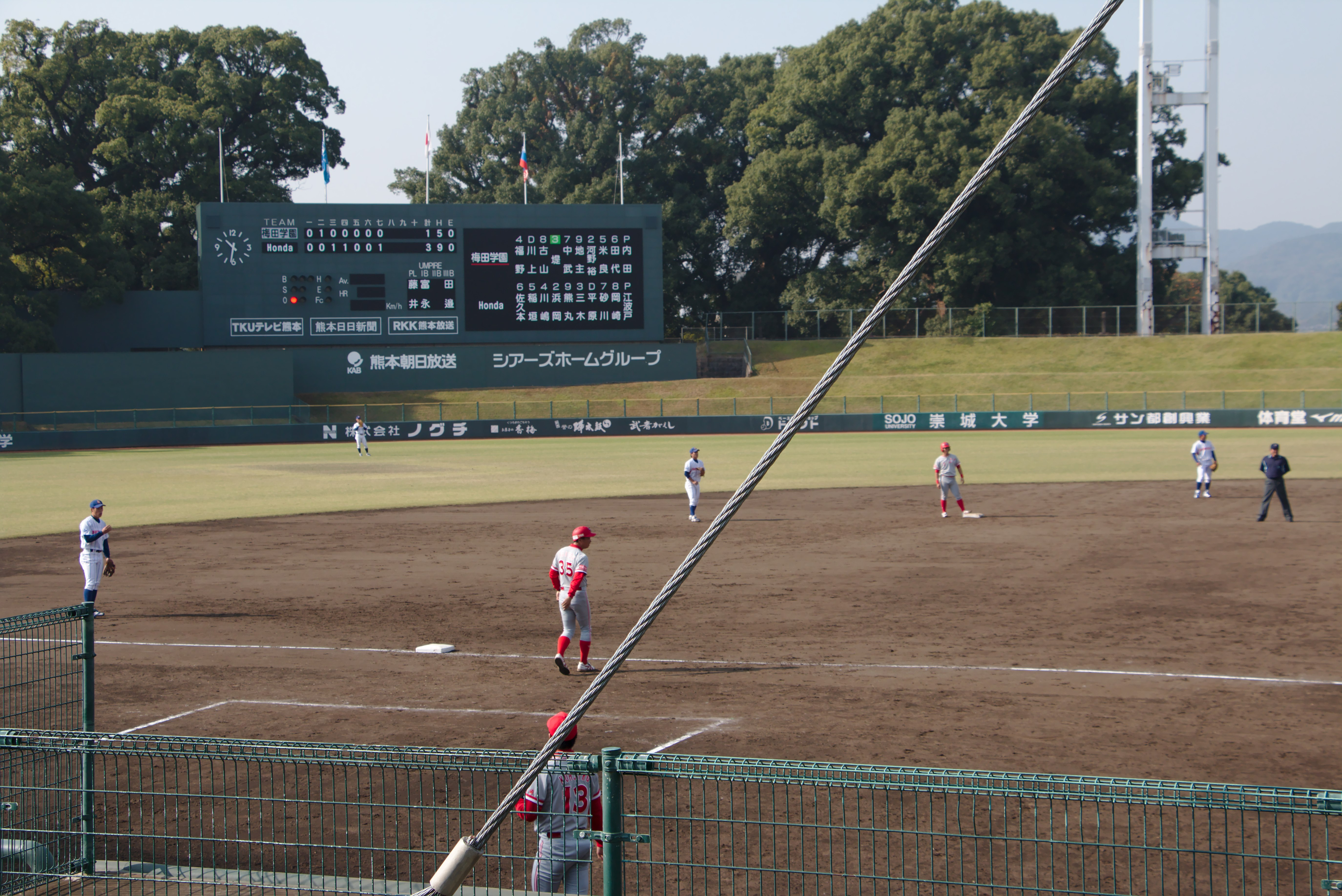
Kumamoto Fujisakidai Baseball Stadium

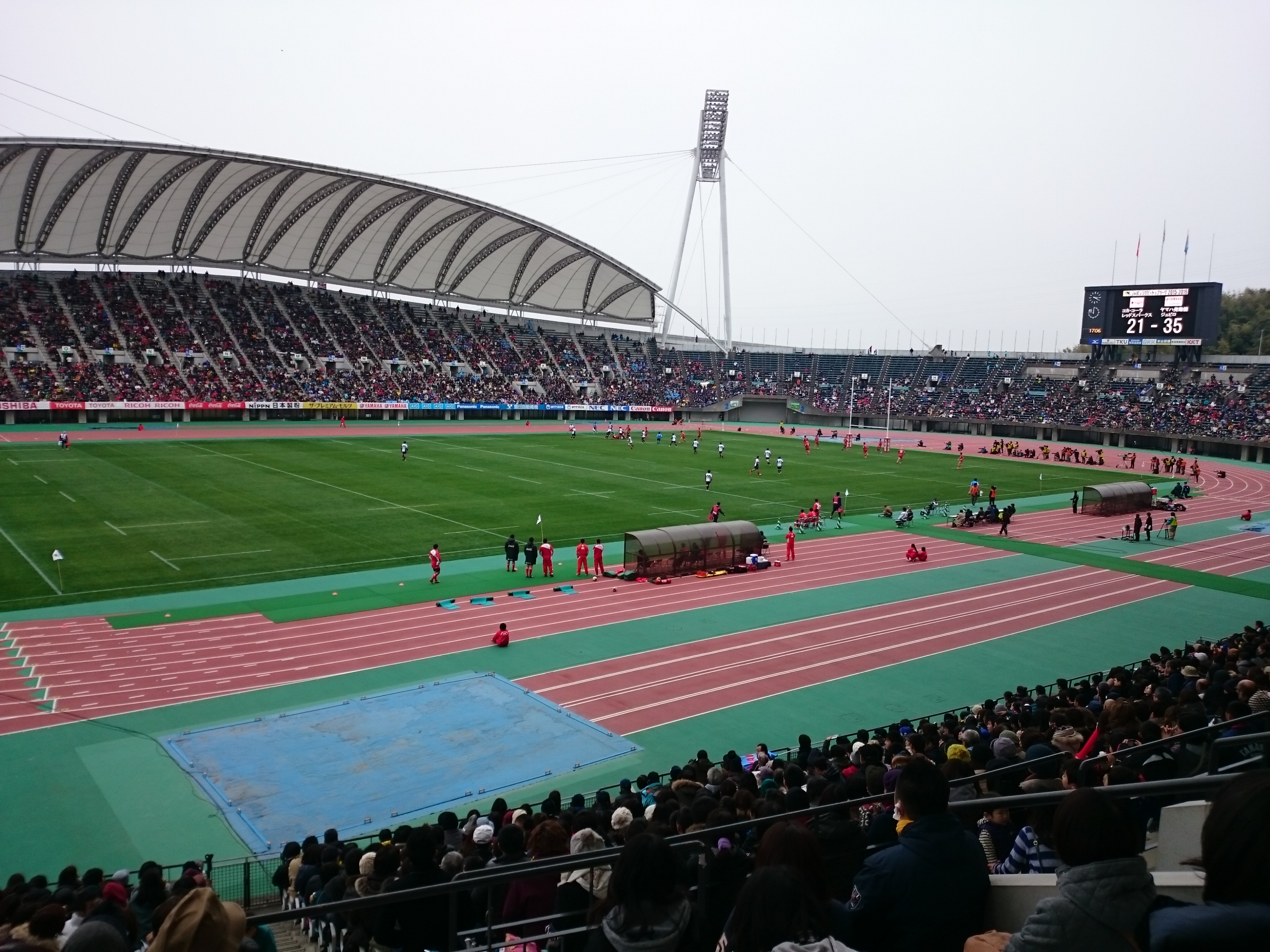
Egao Kenko Stadium

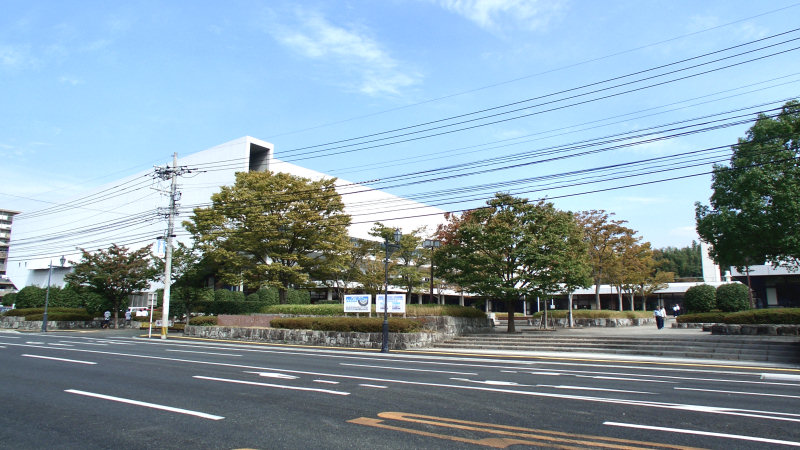
Kumamoto Prefectural Gymnasium

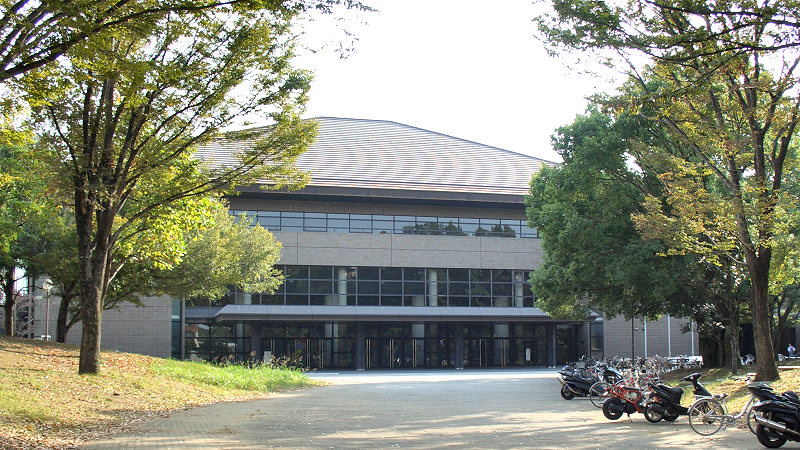
Kumamoto City Synthesis Gymnasium

==== Sporting events ====
The Kumamoto Castle Marathon is a yearly event in Kumamoto City. It was established in commemoration of Kumamoto becoming a designated city in 2012. The city also hosted the 1997 World Men's Handball Championship and the 2019 World Women's Handball Championship.

== Sister cities ==
Kumamoto is twinned with the following cities.

- Billings, Montana, United States
- Bristol, England, United Kingdom
- Guilin, Guangxi, People's Republic of China
- Heidelberg, Baden-Württemberg, Germany, since 1992
- Helena, Montana, United States
- Rome, Georgia, United States, since 1995
- San Antonio, Texas, United States, since 1987
- Ulsan, South Korea, since 2010
- Kaohsiung, Taiwan, since 2017

== Notable people ==
- Aimer, pop singer and lyricist.
- Naoichi and Mutsue Inomoto Fujimori, parents of Alberto Fujimori, the 54th President of Peru.
- Yuki Fukushima, Japanese badminton player.
- Lafcadio Hearn, writer, lived in Kumamoto for three years, from 1891.
- Higonoumi Naoya, sumo wrestler.
- Sayaka Hirota, Japanese badminton player.
- Inoue Kowashi, statesman.
- Sayuri Ishikawa, enka singer
- Yuta Iwasada, Japanese baseball player.
- Masahiko Kimura, judoka.
- Kobato Miku, lyricist, rhythm guitarist, singer and creator of the rock band BAND-MAID.
- Noriko Kubo, Japanese female fencer.
- Rie Kugimiya, voice actress.
- Yuri Masuda, vocalist from the group m.o.v.e.
- Musashi Miyamoto, famed swordsman, lived and died in Kumamoto, 1645.
- Yuna Mizumori, professional wrestler
- Chisato Moritaka, pop singer and lyricist.
- Munetaka Murakami, baseball player
- Eiichiro Oda, manga artist, author of One Piece.
- Akari Ogata, judoka.
- Yōko Shimada, actress.
- Go Shiozaki, Japanese professional wrestler, currently signed to the Pro Wrestling Noah promotion and Chairman of the Noah Wrestlers' Association.
- Shōdai Naoya, sumo wrestler.
- Soseki Natsume, writer, lived in Kumamoto, 1896-1900.
- Tochihikari Masayuki, sumo wrestler.
- Momoko Ueda, professional golfer.
- Tadako Urata, ophthalmologist
- Sean Michael Wilson, Scottish manga writer, living in Kumamoto since 2004, his books are often about the city.
- Kaji Yajima, educator, pacifist, president of the WCTU in Japan.
- Yokoi Shōnan, scholar and political reformer.
- Seiki Yoshioka, Japanese professional wrestler
- Isao Yukisada, film director.

== See also ==
- 2026 Kumamoto earthquake
