= Kumamoto Castle Marathon =

Road running event in Kumamoto, Japan

- Date: February
- Location: Kumamoto Prefecture, Japan
- Event type: road
- Distance: Marathon
- Established: 2012
- Website: Kumamoto Castle Marathon

The Kumamoto Castle Marathon (熊本城マラソン, Kumamotojo Marason) is an annual marathon sporting event in Kumamoto City, Kumamoto Prefecture, Japan. It is held in commemoration of the Kumamoto becoming an ordinance-designated city on April 1, 2012. The first running of the event took place on February 19, 2012. The race will take place for the second time on February 17, 2013.
