= Kyūshū Lutheran College =

Higher education institution in Kumamoto Prefecture, Japan

Coordinates: 32°49′13″N 130°43′22″E

Kyushu Lutheran College
- 九州ルーテル学院大学
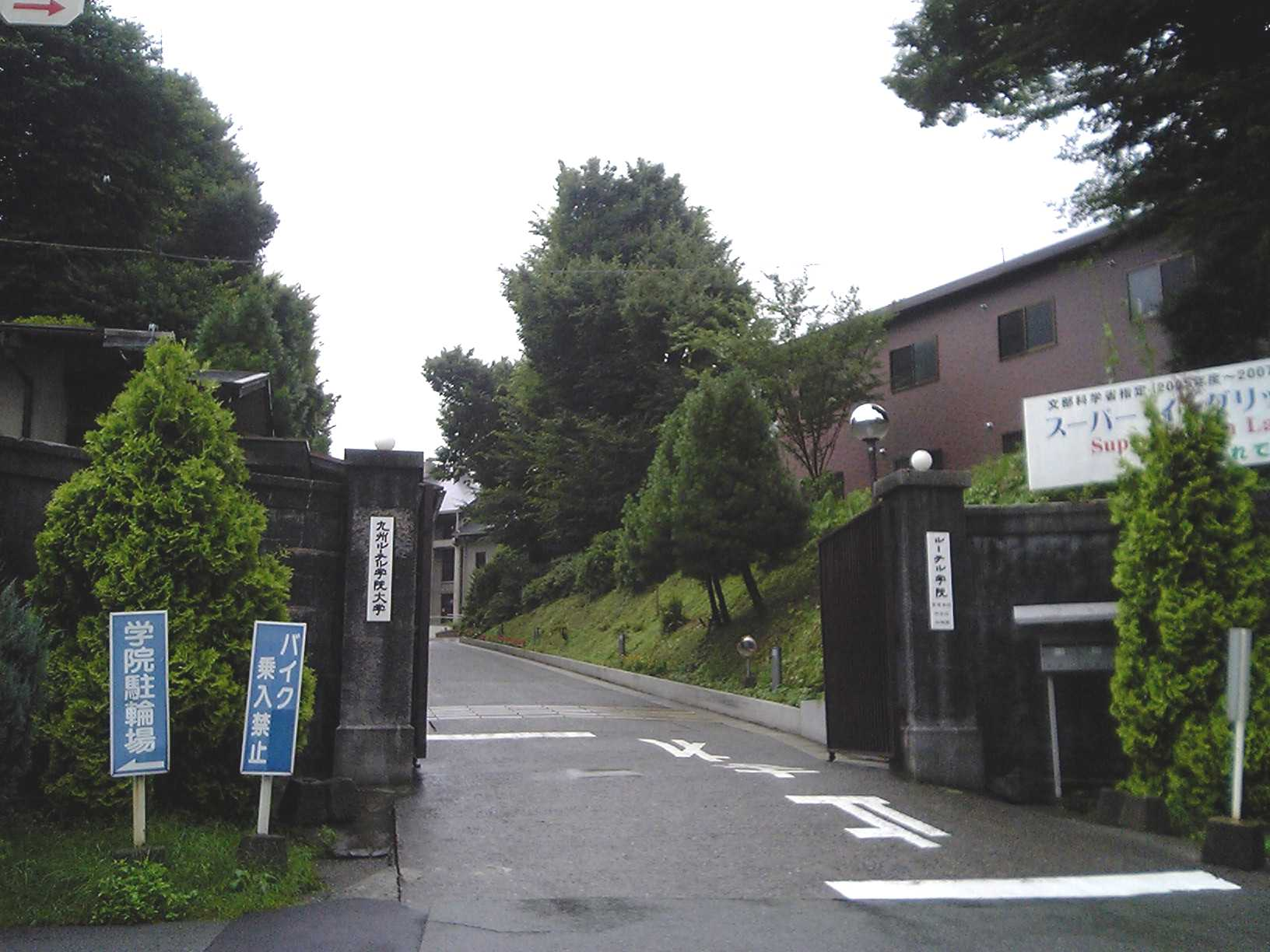
- Type: Private
- Established: 1997
- Affiliations: Japan Evangelical Lutheran Church
- President: Matsumoto Michiaki
- Location: Kumamoto, Japan
- Website: https://www.klc.ac.jp

Kyushu Lutheran College (九州ルーテル学院大学, Kyūshū Lūteru Gakuin Daigaku) is a private college in Kumamoto, Japan. It has its roots in Kyushu Jo-Gakuin (九州女学院), originally established as a girl's high school in 1926 by Lutheran missionary Martha Akard. A women's junior college opened in 1975 and the current four-year, liberal arts college opened its doors to women and men in 1997. The Rev. Dr. Yoshiro Ishida was the college's first president. The Rev. Naohiro Kiyoshige served as college president from 2002-2016. Hirowatari Junko served as the next president from 2016-2022, and the current president, Matsumoto Michiaki, began his tenure in March 2022. In addition to an undergraduate program, a graduate program in clinical psychology is also offered.

Kyushu Lutheran College is located in central Kumamoto City in southwestern Japan on the island of Kyushu. It is one of two colleges affiliated with the Japan Evangelical Lutheran Church. With a long history of affiliation with missionaries, Kyushu Lutheran College is able to offer a rich program of study abroad programs. A daily chapel service is offered, where worship includes music, reading of Scripture, and a message, usually provided by the college chaplain.

In 2023, Bloomberg.com reported that Kyushu Lutheran College would be opening a new international school which was attracting interest from local families, as well as families from Taiwan.

== Studying at Kyushu Lutheran College ==
Humanities

- Career English
- Children's Studies

Clinical Psychology

- Psychology
- Disabilities Studies
- Psychological Welfare
