= Kumamoto Shintoshin Plaza =

Office building in Kumamoto, Japan

Coordinates: 32°47′25.4″N 130°41′27.8″E

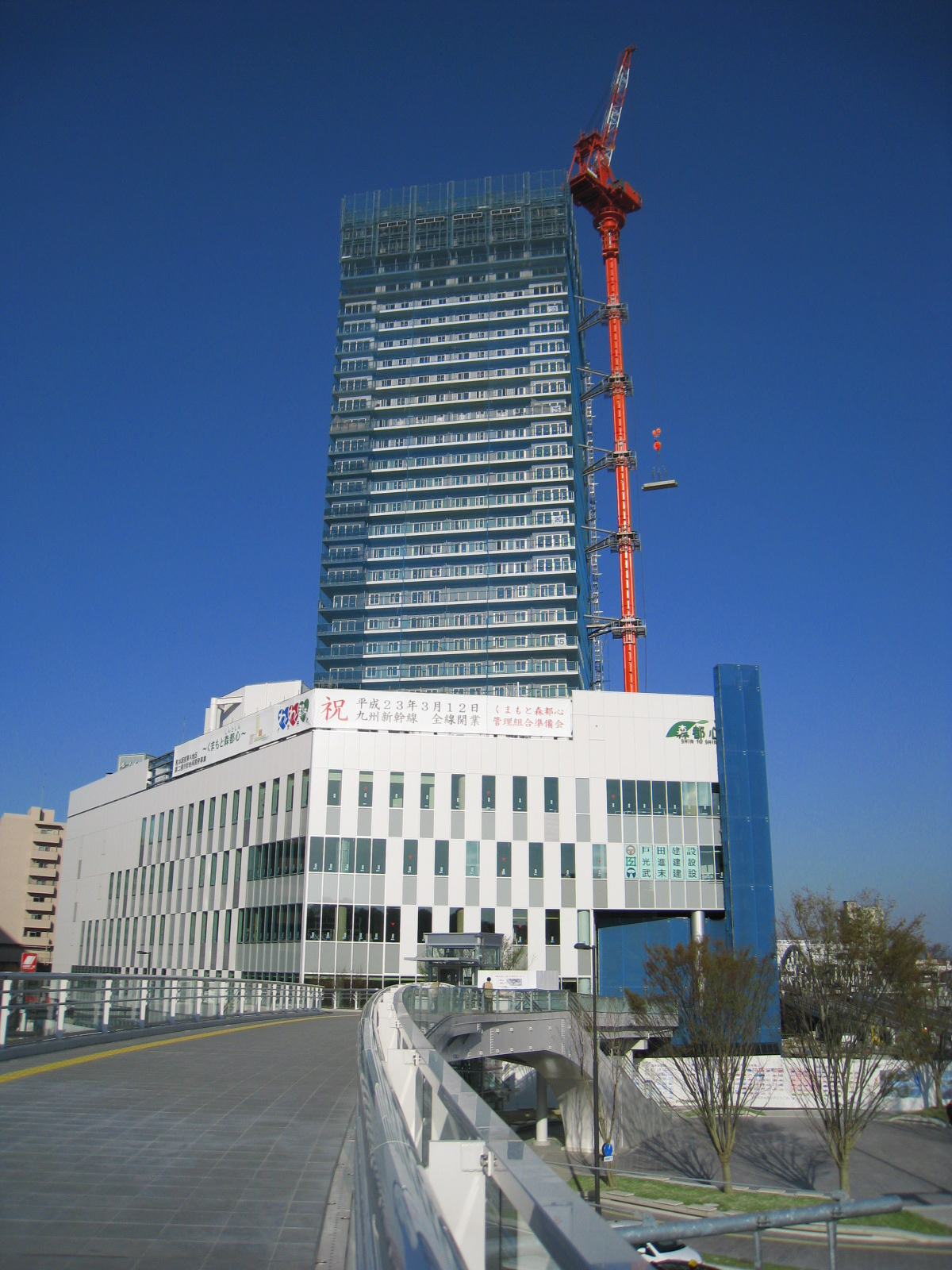
Kumamoto Shintoshin Plaza and the Kumamoto Tower under construction, April 2011

Kumamoto Shintoshin Plaza (くまもと森都心, Kumamoto-shin-toshin), is a major office development by Mori Building in Nishi-ku, Kumamoto, Kumamoto Prefecture, Japan, located in front of Kumamoto Station.

The Kumamoto station reconstruction project is currently in progress, specifically for the full opening of the Kyushu Shinkansen.

== Facilities ==
- Building A (Kumamoto Shintoshin Plaza)
  - Kumamoto Shintoshin Plaza Hall (5F/6F)
  - Business Support Center (4F)
  - Plaza Library (3F/4F)
  - Sightseeing and Regional Information Center (2F)
  - Commercial facilities (1F)
- Building B
  - Reserved for right holders
- Building C
  - The Kumamoto Tower

== History ==
- October 1, 2011: Open for business.
- Spring 2012: The Kumamoto Tower will be completed.
