= Muse no Kagami =

- Directed by: Yūichi Fukuda
- Starring: Aya Hirano; Rino Sashihara
- Ending theme: "Soredemo Suki Da yo" by Rino Sashihara
- Country of origin: Japan
- Original language: Japanese
- No. of seasons: 1
- No. of episodes: 24

Production
- Producers: Shinobu Mōri; Takumi Saitō; Naoko Omodaka
- Running time: 15 minutes

Original release
- Network: NTV
- Release: January 14 – June 23, 2012

Muse no Kagami (ミューズの鏡) is a 2012 Japanese television drama series. It premiered on NTV on 14 January 2012, and concluded 23 June 2012, airing 24 episodes.

== Cast ==
- Aya Hirano as Urara Ayabuki
- Rino Sashihara as Maki Mukouda
- Narushi Ikeda as Ryū Okita
- Nako Mizusawa as Reiko Mikawa
- Moe Arai as Ayano Himekawa
- Terunosuke Takezai as Tsukasa Konoe
