= Tokyo Gore School =

- Directed by: Yōhei Fukuda
- Screenplay by: Yōhei Fukuda; Kiyoshi Yamamoto
- Starring: Yusuke Yamada; Masato Hyūgaji; Takafumi Imai; Kenta Itogi; Shinwa Kataoka; Kōhei Kuroda; Shion Machida; Shōichi Matsuda
- Release date: 2009 (Japan)
- Country: Japan
- Language: Japanese

Tokyo Gore School (学校裏サイト, Gakkō ura saito) is a 2009 Japanese horror film directed by Yōhei Fukuda.

== Cast ==
- Yusuke Yamada as Fujiwara
- Masato Hyūgaji
- Takafumi Imai
- Kenta Itogi
- Shinwa Kataoka
- Kōhei Kuroda
- Shion Machida
- Shōichi Matsuda
