= Railway electrification in Japan =

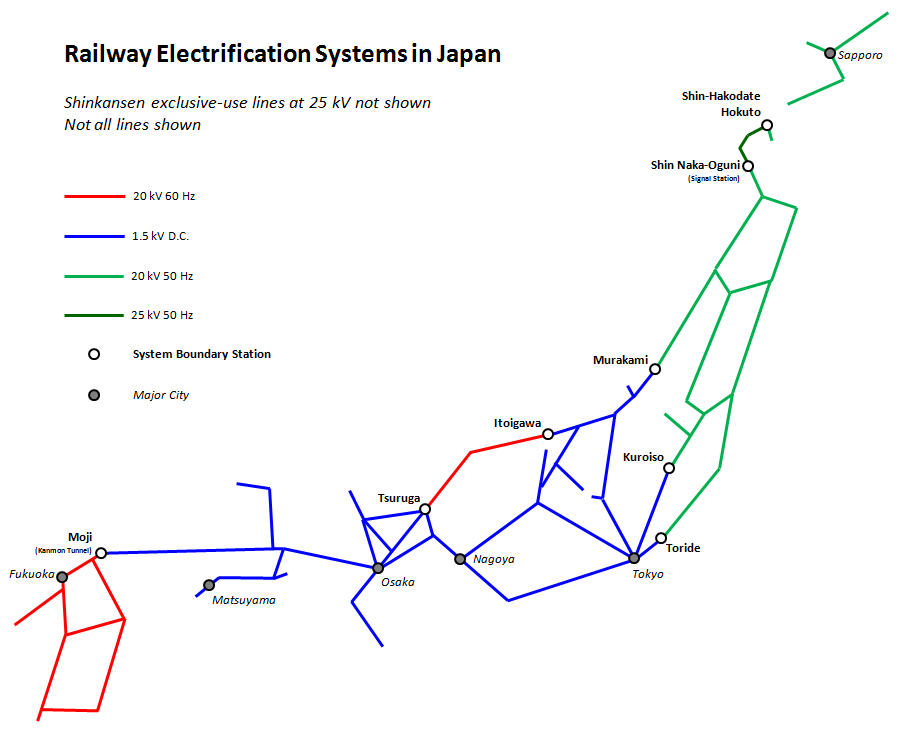
Japan's conventional mainline railway network schematic map showing electrification systems with voltages and frequencies as of 2017. Third-sector railways are included. Shinkansen exclusive-use trackage is not included. Municipal subways and other rapid transit networks are not included. Private railways are not included.

This is a list of railway electrification systems in Japan.

All lines use an overhead line power supply unless otherwise noted. As of 2005, the rail system consists of the following:

- 20,264 kilometres (12,591 mi) of 1,067 mm (3 ft 6 in) narrow gauge, of which 13,280 kilometres (8,250 mi) is electrified.
- 3,204 kilometres (1,991 mi) of 1,435 mm (4 ft 8 1/2 in) standard gauge, all of which is electrified.
- 117 kilometres (73 mi) of 1,372 mm (4 ft 6 in) Scotch gauge, all of which is electrified.
- 11 kilometres (6.8 mi) of 762 mm (2 ft 6 in) narrow gauge, all of which is electrified.

Electrification systems used by the Japan Railways Group, Japan's formerly state-owned operators, are 1,500 V DC and 20 kV AC for conventional lines and mini-Shinkansen, and 25 kV AC for Shinkansen. Electrification at 600 V DC and 750 V DC are also seen in private lines and non-rail based transit systems.

The frequency of the AC power supply is 50 Hz in Eastern Japan and 60 Hz in Western Japan.

== DC electrified ==
=== 200 V ===
| Name | Operator | Gauge | Notes |
|---|---|---|---|
| Ikoma Cable Line | Kintetsu Railway | 1,067 mm | Cable railway |
| Nishi-Shigi Cable Line | Kintetsu Railway | 1,067 mm | Cable railway |

=== 440 V ===
| Name | Operator | Gauge | Notes |
|---|---|---|---|
| Skyrail Midorizaka Line | Sky Rail Service | Suspended monorail | Closed April 30, 2024 |

=== 600 V ===
==== 1,067 mm gauge ====
| Name | Operator | Notes |
|---|---|---|
| Chōshi Electric Railway Line | Chōshi Electric Railway | |
| Katsuyama Eiheiji Line | Echizen Railway | |
| Mikuni Awara Line | Echizen Railway | |
| Enoshima Electric Railway Line | Enoshima Electric Railway | |
| Fukubu Line | Fukui Railway | |
| Ishikawa Line | Hokuriku Railroad | |
| Hanazono Line | Iyotetsu | |
| Honmachi Line | Iyotetsu | |
| Jōhoku Line | Iyotetsu | |
| Jōnan Line | Iyotetsu | |
| Ōtemachi Line | Iyotetsu | |
| Takahama Line | Iyotetsu | |
| Fujisaki Line | Kumamoto Electric Railway | |
| Kikuchi Line | Kumamoto Electric Railway | |
| Shinminatokō Line | Manyosen | |
| Takaoka Kidō Line | Manyosen | |
| Higashiyama Line | Okayama Electric Tramway | |
| Seikibashi Line | Okayama Electric Tramway | |
| Sapporo Streetcar | Sapporo Transportation Service Promotion Corporation | |
| Shizuoka–Shimizu Line | Shizuoka Railway | |
| Gomen Line | Tosaden Kōtsū | |
| Ino Line | Tosaden Kōtsū | |
| Sanbashi Line | Tosaden Kōtsū | |
| Toyama City Tram Line | Toyama Chihō Railway | |
| Toyamakō Line | Toyama Chihō Railway | |
| Azumada Main Line | Toyohashi Railroad | |

==== 1,435 mm gauge ====
| Name | Operator | Notes |
|---|---|---|
| Chikuhō Electric Railroad Line | Chikuho Electric Railroad | |
| Eizan Main Line | Eizan Electric Railway | |
| Kurama Line | Eizan Electric Railway | |
| Hankai Line | Hankai Tramway | |
| Uemachi Line | Hankai Tramway | |
| Eba Line | Hiroshima Electric Railway | |
| Hakushima Line | Hiroshima Electric Railway | |
| Hijiyama Line | Hiroshima Electric Railway | |
| Main Line | Hiroshima Electric Railway | |
| Miyajima Line | Hiroshima Electric Railway | |
| Ujina Line | Hiroshima Electric Railway | |
| Yokogawa Line | Hiroshima Electric Railway | |
| Kagoshima City Tram | Kagoshima City Transportation Bureau | |
| Arashiyama Line | Keifuku Electric Railroad | |
| Kitano Line | Keifuku Electric Railroad | |
| Kumamoto City Tram | Kumamoto City Transportation Bureau | |
| Nagasaki Electric Tramway | | |
| Ginza Line | Tokyo Metro | Third rail |
| Marunouchi Line | Tokyo Metro | Third rail |
| Nagoya Municipal Subway Higashiyama Line | Nagoya City Transportation Bureau | Third rail |
| Nagoya Municipal Subway Meijō Line | Nagoya City Transportation Bureau | Third rail |
| Nagoya Municipal Subway Meikō Line | Nagoya City Transportation Bureau | Third rail |

==== Other gauges ====
| Name | Operator | Gauge | Notes |
|---|---|---|---|
| Hakodate City Tram | Hakodate City Tram Department | 1,372 mm | |
| Main Line; Part of Tateyama Kurobe Alpine Route | Kurobe Gorge Railway | 762 mm | |
| Tateyama Tunnel Trolleybus; Part of Tateyama Kurobe Alpine Route | Tateyama Kurobe Kanko | Trolleybus | |
| Ueno Zoo Monorail | Tokyo Metropolitan Bureau of Transportation | Suspended monorail | Overhead contact Service suspended since 2019 |
| Toden Arakawa Line | Tokyo Metropolitan Bureau of Transportation | 1,372 mm | Only surviving Tokyo Toden |
| Setagaya Line | Tokyu Railways | 1,372 mm | |

=== 750 V ===
| Name | Operator | Gauge | Notes |
|---|---|---|---|
| Enshū Railway Line | Enshu Railway | 1,067 mm | |
| Hakone Tozan Line (Hakone-Yumoto – Gōra) | Hakone Tozan Railway | 1,435 mm | 1,067 mm gauge section (Odawara – Hakone-Yumoto) uses 1,500 V, dead section within Hakone-Yumoto |
| Astram Line | Hiroshima Rapid Transit | People mover (1,700 mm-wide track) | Third rail, Side contact |
| Gunchū Line | Iyotetsu | 1,067 mm | |
| Yokogawara Line | Iyotetsu | 1,067 mm | |
| Keihanna Line | Kintetsu Railway | 1,435 mm | Third rail |
| Namboku Line | Kita-Osaka Kyuko Railway | 1,435 mm | Third rail |
| Chūō Line | Osaka Metro | 1,435 mm | Third rail |
| Midōsuji Line | Osaka Metro | 1,435 mm | Third rail |
| Sennichimae Line | Osaka Metro | 1,435 mm | Third rail |
| Tanimachi Line | Osaka Metro | 1,435 mm | Third rail |
| Yotsubashi Line | Osaka Metro | 1,435 mm | Third rail |
| Hokusei Line | Sangi Railway | 762 mm | Was operated by Kintetsu until 2003 |
| Sapporo Municipal Subway Namboku Line | Sapporo City Transportation Bureau | Rubber-tyred metro | Third rail |
| Yamaguchi Line | Seibu Railway | People mover | Third rail |
| Haneda Airport Line | Tokyo Monorail | Straddle–beam monorail | Side contact |
| Utsunomiya Light Rail Line | Utsunomiya Light Rail | 1,067 mm | |
| Yūkarigaoka Line | Yamaman | People mover | Under-floor contact |
| Kintetsu Hachiōji Line | Yokkaichi Asunarou Railway | 762 mm | Was operated by Kintetsu until 2015 |
| Utsube Line | Yokkaichi Asunarou Railway | 762 mm | Was operated by Kintetsu until 2015 |
| Yokohama Municipal Subway Blue Line | Yokohama City Transportation Bureau | 1,435 mm | Third rail |
| Kanazawa Seaside Line | Yokohama Seaside Line | People mover (1,700 mm-wide track) | Third rail |

=== 1,500 V ===
==== 1,067 mm gauge ====
| Name | Operator | Notes |
|---|---|---|
| Agatsuma Line | JR East | |
| Echigo Line | JR East | |
| Hachikō Line (Hachioji – Komagawa, Kita-Fujioka – Kuragano) | JR East | Komagawa – Kita-Fujioka section is not electrified, for Kita-Fujioka – Kuragano section, only trains of Takasaki Line may use for switch-back, trains of Hachikō Line remain use DMU |
| Hakushin Line | JR East | |
| Itō Line | JR East | |
| Itsukaichi Line | JR East | |
| Jōban Line (Nippori – Toride); Consists of Jōban Line local service and Jōban Line rapid service | JR East | Dead section between Toride – Fujishiro, 20 kV, 50 Hz electrified north of the dead section |
| Jōetsu Line | JR East | Except Echigo-Yuzawa – Gala-Yuzawa (de facto Shinkansen section, 25 kV, 50 Hz electrified) |
| Karasuyama Line (within Karasuyama Station, for charging purpose) | JR East | While not de jure considered electrified line, all trains except reserved cruise trains are using battery EMU |
| Kashima Line | JR East | |
| Kawagoe Line | JR East | |
| Keiyō Line | JR East | |
| Mito Line (Near Oyama Station) | JR East | Dead section between Oyama – Otabayashi, 20 kV, 50 Hz electrified east of the dead section |
| Musashino Line | JR East | |
| Nambu Line | JR East | |
| Narita Line | JR East | |
| Negishi Line | JR East | |
| Nikkō Line | JR East | |
| Ōito Line (Matsumoto – Minami-Otari) | JR East | JR West section (Minami-Otari – Itoigawa) is not electrified |
| Ōme Line | JR East | |
| Ryōmō Line | JR East | |
| Sagami Line | JR East | |
| Saikyo Line | JR East | |
| Senseki Line | JR East | Except freight-only Rikuzen-Yamashita – Ishinomakikō and Senseki-Tōhoku Line connection (Matsushima – Takagimachi), where both are not electrified |
| Shin'etsu Main Line | JR East | Except freight-only Kami-Nuttari signal base – Higashi-Niigatakō (not electrified) |
| Shinonoi Line | JR East | |
| Sōbu Main Line; Consists of Chūō-Sōbu Line local service and Yokusuka-Sōbu rapid service line | JR East | Except freight-only Shinkoiwa shingōjō – Etchūjima Kamotsu (not electrified) |
| Sotobō Line | JR East | |
| Takasaki Line | JR East | |
| Tōgane Line | JR East | |
| Tōhoku Main Line (Tokyo – Kuroiso); Also known as Utsunomiya Line. Consists of Ueno–Tokyo Line, Keihin-Tōhoku Line, and Shōnan-Shinjuku Line | JR East | Dead section between Kuroiso – Takaku, 20 kV, 50 Hz electrified north of the dead section |
| Tsurumi Line | JR East | |
| Uchibō Line | JR East | |
| Uetsu Main Line (Niitsu – Murakami) | JR East | Dead section between Murakami – Majima, 20 kV, 50 Hz electrified northeast of the dead section |
| Yahiko Line | JR East | |
| Yamanote Line | JR East | |
| Yokohama Line | JR East | |
| Yokosuka Line | JR East | |
| Chūō Main Line; Consists of Chūō-Sōbu Line local service, Chūō Line rapid service and Chūō Line Nagoya | JR East, JR Central | |
| Tōkaidō Main Line; Consists of Shōnan-Shinjuku Line, Yokusuka-Sōbu rapid service line, Sōtetsu-JR through line, Keihin-Tōhoku Line, Biwako Line, JR Kyoto Line, JR Kobe Line, and Tōkaidō Freight Line | JR East, JR Central, JR West | Except freight-only Sannō signal base – Nagoya Minato |
| Gotemba Line | JR Central | |
| Iida Line | JR Central | |
| Minobu Line | JR Central | |
| Taketoyo Line | JR Central | Except freight-only tracks near Ōbu Station |
| Kansai Main Line (Nagoya – Kameyama, Kamo – JR Namba); Consists of Kansai Line Nagoya and Yamatoji Line | JR Central, JR West | Kameyama – Kamo section is not electrified |
| Akō Line | JR West | |
| Bantan Line (Himeji – Teramae) | JR West | Teramae – Wadayama section is not electrified |
| Fukuchiyama Line | JR West | |
| Fukuen Line (Fukuyama – Fuchū) | JR West | Fuchū – Shimo-Kawabe section was electrified during 1954–1962, then demolished, Shimo-Kawabe – Shiomachi section is never electrified |
| Hakubi Line | JR West | |
| Hanwa Line | JR West | |
| Hokuriku Main Line (Maibara – Tsuruga) | JR West | Dead section between Tsuruga – Minami-Imajō, 20 kV, 60 Hz electrified northeast of the dead section |
| JR Tōzai Line | JR West | |
| Kakogawa Line | JR West | |
| Kansai Airport Line | JR West | Concurrent with Nankai Airport Line within Sky Gate Bridge R |
| Katamachi LineAlso known as Gakkentoshi Line | JR West | |
| Kisei Main Line (Wakayamashi – Shingū) | JR West | JR Central section (Shingū – Kameyama) is not electrified |
| Kabe Line | JR West | |
| Kosei Line | JR West | |
| Kure Line | JR West | |
| Kusatsu Line | JR West | |
| Maizuru Line | JR West | |
| Nanao Line (Naka-tsubata – Wakuraonsen) | JR West | Dead section between Tsubata – Naka-tsubata, 20 kV, 60 Hz electrified near Tsubata Station, partially concurrent with another same named line of Noto Railway (see below) |
| Nara Line | JR West | |
| Obama Line | JR West | |
| Onoda Line | JR West | |
| Osaka Higashi Line | JR West | |
| Osaka Loop Line | JR West | |
| Sakai Line (Yonago – Gotō depot) | JR West | Only for dead mileage purpose of San'in Main Line trains in Gotō depot, trains of Sakai Line are all using DMU, not de jure considered electrified line, the rest Sakai Line is not electrified |
| Sakurai Line | JR West | |
| Sakurajima Line | JR West | |
| San'in Main Line (Kyōoto – Kinosaki Onsen, Hōki-Daisen – Nishi-Izumo); Also known as Sagano Line (Kyoto-Sonobe) | JR West | Kinosaki Onsen – Hōki-Daisen, and Nishi-Izumo – Hatabu sections are not electrified |
| Ube Line | JR West | |
| Uno Line | JR West | |
| Wakayama Line | JR West | |
| Honshi-Bisan Line | JR West, JR Shikoku | |
| Dosan Line (Tadotsu – Kotohira) | JR Shikoku | Kotohira – Kubokawa section is not electrified |
| Yosan Line (Takamatsu – Iyoshi) | JR Shikoku | Iyoshi – Uwajima section is not electrified |
| San'yō Main Line (Kōbe – Shimonoseki) Consists of JR Kobe Line, Wadamisaki Line and Sanyo Line Hiroshima | JR West, JR Kyushu | Dead section between Shimonoseki – Moji (at Kyushu gate of Kanmon Railway Tunnel), 20 kV, 60 Hz electrified within Moji Station (except a freight-only track, to which its dead section is located west of Moji Station) |
| Chikuhi Line (Meinohama – Karatsu) | JR Kyushu | Karatsu – Imari section is not electrified |
| Karatsu Line (Karatsu – Nishi-Karatsu) | JR Kyushu | Kubota – Karatsu section is not electrified |
| Aichi Loop Line | Aichi Loop Railway | |
| Aizu Line (Aizu-Tajima – Aizukōgen-Ozeguchi) | Aizu Railway | As of 2022, all trains of Aizu Railway are DMUs, electrification is used by Tobu Railway trains, the rest Aizu Line is not electrified |
| Kamikōchi Line | Alpico Kōtsū | |
| Chichibu Main Line | Chichibu Railway | |
| Mikajiri Line | Chichibu Railway | Freight line |
| Myōkō Haneuma Line | Echigo Tokimeki Railway | was a part of Shin'etsu Main Line until 2015 |
| Nihonkai Hisui Line (Kajiyashiki – Naoetsu) | Echigo Tokimeki Railway | Dead section between Echigo Oshiage Hisui Kaigan – Kajiyashiki, 20 kV, 60 Hz electrified west of the dead section, was a part of Hokuriku Main Line until 2015 |
| Fujikyuko Line | Fuji Kyuko | |
| Fukuoka City Subway Hakozaki Line | Fukuoka City Transportation Bureau | |
| Fukuoka City Subway Airport Line | Fukuoka City Transportation Bureau | |
| Iizaka Line | Fukushima Transportation | |
| Gakunan Railway Line | Gakunan Electric Train | |
| Hakone Tozan Line (Odawara – Hakone-Yumoto) | Hakone Tozan Railway | include dual gauge section (see below) the rest 1,435 mm gauge section (Hakone-Yumoto – Gōra) uses 750 V, dead section within Hakone-Yumoto |
| Hokuhoku Line | Hokuetsu Express | |
| Asanogawa Line | Hokuriku Railroad | |
| Ibara Line (Sōja – Kiyone) | Ibara Railway | All Ibara Railway trains are DMU, electrification is used by JR West |
| Kita-Matsue Line | Ichibata Electric Railway | |
| Taisha Line | Ichibata Electric Railway | |
| Iga Line | Iga Railway | Was operated by Kintetsu until 2007 |
| Daiyūzan Line | Izuhakone Railway | |
| Sunzu Line | Izuhakone Railway | |
| Izu Kyūkō Line | Izukyū | |
| Jōmō Line | Jomo Electric Railway | |
| Joshin Line | Jōshin Electric Railway | |
| Inokashira Line | Keio Corporation | |
| Domyoji Line | Kintetsu Railway | |
| Gose Line | Kintetsu Railway | |
| Minami Osaka Line | Kintetsu Railway | |
| Nagano Line | Kintetsu Railway | |
| Yoshino Line | Kintetsu Railway | |
| Ao Line | Kobe Electric Railway | |
| Arima Line | Kobe Electric Railway | |
| Kobe Kosoku Line | Kobe Electric Railway | |
| Kōen-Toshi Line | Kobe Electric Railway | |
| Sanda Line | Kobe Electric Railway | |
| Kōnan Line | Kōnan Railway | |
| Ōwani Line | Kōnan Railway | |
| Airport Line | Meitetsu | |
| Bisai Line | Meitetsu | |
| Chikkō Line | Meitetsu | |
| Chita New Line | Meitetsu | |
| Gamagōri Line | Meitetsu | |
| Hashima Line | Meitetsu | |
| Hiromi Line | Meitetsu | |
| Inuyama Line | Meitetsu | |
| Kakamigahara Line | Meitetsu | |
| Komaki Line | Meitetsu | |
| Kōwa Line | Meitetsu | |
| Mikawa Line | Meitetsu | |
| Nagoya Main Line | Meitetsu | |
| Nishio Line | Meitetsu | |
| Seto Line | Meitetsu | |
| Takehana Line | Meitetsu | |
| Toyokawa Line | Meitetsu | |
| Tokoname Line | Meitetsu | |
| Toyota Line | Meitetsu | |
| Tsushima Line | Meitetsu | |
| Tsukuba Express (Akihabara – Moriya) | Metropolitan Intercity Railway Company | Dead section between Moriya – Miraidaira, 20 kV, 50 Hz electrified north of the dead section |
| Mizuma Line | Mizuma Railway | |
| Nagano Line | Nagano Electric Railway | |
| Aonami Line | Nagoya Rinkai Rapid Transit | |
| Airport Line | Nankai Electric Railway | Concurrent with JR Kansai Airport Line within Sky Gate Bridge R |
| Kada Line | Nankai Electric Railway | |
| Koya Line | Nankai Electric Railway | |
| Nankai Main Line | Nankai Electric Railway | |
| Takashinohama Line | Nankai Electric Railway | |
| Tanagawa Line | Nankai Electric Railway | |
| Wakayamako Line | Nankai Electric Railway | |
| Kaizuka Line | Nishi-Nippon Railroad | |
| Nanao Line (Nanao – Wakuraonsen) | Noto Railway | The rest of Noto Railway Nanao Line is not electrified, and the only electrified section is concurrent with another same named line of JR West above |
| Enoshima Line | Odakyu Electric Railway | |
| Odawara Line | Odakyu Electric Railway | |
| Tama Line | Odakyu Electric Railway | |
| Main Line | Ohmi Railway | |
| Taga Line | Ohmi Railway | |
| Yōkaichi Line | Ohmi Railway | |
| Ikawa Line (Abt Ichishiro – Nagashima Dam) | Ōigawa Railway | The electrified section is an abt rack section, rest sections of Ikawa Line are not electrified |
| Ōigawa Main Line | Ōigawa Railway | |
| Nagareyama Line | Ryutetsu | |
| Atsugi Line | Sagami Railway | Freight line |
| Izumino Line | Sagami Railway | |
| Shin-Yokohama Line | Sagami Railway | |
| Sotetsu Main Line | Sagami Railway | |
| Saitama Rapid Railway Line | Saitama Railway Corporation | |
| Sangi Line | Sangi Railway | |
| Chichibu Line | Seibu Railway | |
| Haijima Line | Seibu Railway | |
| Ikebukuro Line | Seibu Railway | |
| Kokubunji Line | Seibu Railway | |
| Sayama Line | Seibu Railway | |
| Seibuen Line | Seibu Railway | |
| Shinjuku Line | Seibu Railway | |
| Tamagawa Line | Seibu Railway | |
| Tamako Line | Seibu Railway | |
| Toshima Line | Seibu Railway | |
| Yūrakuchō Line | Seibu Railway | |
| Sendai Subway Namboku Line | Sendai City Transportation Bureau | |
| Kita-Shinano Line | Shinano Railway | Was a part of Shin'etsu Main Line until 2015 |
| Shinano Railway Line | Shinano Railway | Was a part of Shin'etsu Main Line until 1997 |
| Daishi Line | Tobu Railway | |
| Isesaki Line; Also known as Skytree Line | Tobu Railway | |
| Kameido Line | Tobu Railway | |
| Kinugawa Line | Tobu Railway | |
| Kiryū Line | Tobu Railway | |
| Koizumi Line | Tobu Railway | |
| Nikkō Line | Tobu Railway | |
| Ogose Line | Tobu Railway | |
| Sano Line | Tobu Railway | |
| Tōjō Line | Tobu Railway | |
| Urban Park Line | Tobu Railway | |
| Utsunomiya Line | Tobu Railway | |
| Chiyoda Line | Tokyo Metro | |
| Fukutoshin Line | Tokyo Metro | |
| Hanzomon Line | Tokyo Metro | |
| Hibiya Line | Tokyo Metro | |
| Namboku Line | Tokyo Metro | |
| Tozai Line | Tokyo Metro | |
| Yūrakuchō Line | Tokyo Metro | |
| Toei Mita Line | Tokyo Metropolitan Bureau of Transportation | |
| Rinkai Line | Tokyo Waterfront Area Rapid Transit | |
| Den-en-toshi Line | Tokyu Railway | |
| Ikegami Line | Tokyu Railway | |
| Kodomonokuni Line | Tokyu Railway | |
| Meguro Line | Tokyu Railway | |
| Ōimachi Line | Tokyu Railway | |
| Tamagawa Line | Tokyu Railway | |
| Tōyoko Line | Tokyu Railway | |
| Fujikoshi Line | Toyama Chihō Railway | |
| Kamidaki Line | Toyama Chihō Railway | |
| Main Line | Toyama Chihō Railway | |
| Tateyama Line | Toyama Chihō Railway | |
| Tōyō Rapid Railway Line | Toyo Rapid Railway | |
| Atsumi Line | Toyohashi Railroad | |
| Kamiiida Line | Transportation Bureau City of Nagoya | |
| Nagoya Municipal Subway Sakura-dōri Line | Transportation Bureau City of Nagoya | |
| Nagoya Municipal Subway Tsurumai Line | Transportation Bureau City of Nagoya | |
| Bessho Line | Uedadentetsu | |
| Kishigawa Line | Wakayama Electric Railway | |
| Miyafuku Line | Willer Trains | All trains of Willer Trains are DMU, JR West run EMU through trains in both lines |
| Miyazu Line (Miyazu – Amanohashidate) | Willer Trains | All trains of Willer Trains are DMU, JR West run EMU through trains in both lines |
| Aizu Kinugawa Line | Yagan Railway | |
| Minatomirai Line | Yokohama Minatomirai Railway | |
| Yōrō Line | Yoro Railway | Was operated by Kintetsu until 2007 |

==== 1,435 mm gauge ====
| Name | Operator | Notes |
|---|---|---|
| Fukuoka City Subway Nanakuma Line | Fukuoka City Transportation Bureau | Linear motors |
| Hakone Tozan Line (Iriuda – Hakone-Yumoto) | Hakone Tozan Railway | Dual gauge section. The remaining 1,435 mm gauge section (Hakone-Yumoto – Gōra) uses 750 V, dead section within Hakone-Yumoto |
| Arashiyama Line | Hankyu | |
| Imazu Line | Hankyu | |
| Itami Line | Hankyu | |
| Kōbe Kosoku Line | Hankyu | |
| Kōbe Main Line | Hankyu | |
| Kōyō Line | Hankyu | |
| Kyoto Main Line | Hankyu | |
| Minoo Line | Hankyu | |
| Senri Line | Hankyu | |
| Takarazuka Main Line | Hankyu | |
| Hanshin Main Line | Hanshin Electric Railway | |
| Kōbe Kosoku Line | Hanshin Electric Railway | |
| Mukogawa Line | Hanshin Electric Railway | |
| Namba Line | Hanshin Electric Railway | |
| Hokusō Line | Hokuso Railway | |
| Ishiyama Sakamoto Line | Keihan Electric Railway | |
| Katano Line | Keihan Electric Railway | |
| Keihan Main Line | Keihan Electric Railway | |
| Keishin Line | Keihan Electric Railway | |
| Nakanoshima Line | Keihan Electric Railway | |
| Ōtō Line | Keihan Electric Railway | |
| Uji Line | Keihan Electric Railway | |
| Airport Line | Keikyu | |
| Daishi Line | Keikyu | |
| Keikyū Main Line | Keikyu | |
| Kurihama Line | Keikyu | |
| Zushi Line | Keikyu | |
| Chiba Line | Keisei Electric Railway | |
| Chihara Line | Keisei Electric Railway | |
| Higashi-Narita Line | Keisei Electric Railway | |
| Kanamachi Line | Keisei Electric Railway | |
| Keisei Main Line | Keisei Electric Railway | |
| Narita Airport Line | Keisei Electric Railway | |
| Oshiage Line | Keisei Electric Railway | |
| Ikoma Line | Kintetsu Railway | |
| Kashihara Line | Kintetsu Railway | |
| Kyoto Line | Kintetsu Railway | |
| Nagoya Line | Kintetsu Railway | |
| Namba Line | Kintetsu Railway | |
| Nara Line | Kintetsu Railway | |
| Osaka Line | Kintetsu Railway | |
| Shigi Line | Kintetsu Railway | |
| Shima Line | Kintetsu Railway | |
| Suzuka Line | Kintetsu Railway | |
| Tawaramoto Line | Kintetsu Railway | |
| Tenri Line | Kintetsu Railway | |
| Toba Line | Kintetsu Railway | |
| Yamada Line | Kintetsu Railway | |
| Yunoyama Line | Kintetsu Railway | |
| Kōbe Municipal Subway Hokushin Line | Kobe Municipal Transportation Bureau | |
| Kōbe Municipal Subway Kaigan Line | Kobe Municipal Transportation Bureau | |
| Kōbe Municipal Subway Seishin-Yamate Line | Kobe Municipal Transportation Bureau | |
| Kyoto Municipal Subway Karasuma Line | Kyoto Municipal Transportation Bureau | |
| Kyoto Municipal Subway Tōzai Line | Kyoto Municipal Transportation Bureau | |
| Amagi Line | Nishi-Nippon Railroad | |
| Dazaifu Line | Nishi-Nippon Railroad | |
| Tenjin Ōmuta Line | Nishi-Nippon Railroad | |
| Myoken Line | Nose Electric Railway | |
| Nissei Line | Nose Electric Railway | |
| Imazatosuji Line | Osaka Metro | Linear motors |
| Nagahori Tsurumi-ryokuchi Line | Osaka Metro | Linear motors |
| Sakaisuji Line | Osaka Metro | |
| Aboshi Line | Sanyo Electric Railway | |
| Main Line | Sanyo Electric Railway | |
| Sendai Subway Tōzai Line | Sendai City Transportation Bureau | Linear motors |
| Shibayama Railway Line | Shibayama Railway | |
| Kotohira Line | Takamatsu-Kotohira Electric Railroad | |
| Nagao Line | Takamatsu-Kotohira Electric Railroad | |
| Shido Line | Takamatsu-Kotohira Electric Railroad | |
| Toei Asakusa Line | Tokyo Metropolitan Bureau of Transportation | |
| Toei Oedo Line | Tokyo Metropolitan Bureau of Transportation | Linear motors |
| Yokohama Municipal Subway Green Line | Yokohama City Transportation Bureau | Linear motors |

===== Other gauges =====
| Name | Operator | Gauge | Notes |
|---|---|---|---|
| Linimo | Aichi Rapid Transit | HSST-Maglev | Third rail |
| Line 1 | Chiba Urban Monorail | Suspended monorail | Third rail, side contact |
| Line 2 | Chiba Urban Monorail | Suspended monorail | Third rail, side contact |
| Dōbutsuen Line | Keio Corporation | 1,372 mm | |
| Keibajō Line | Keio Corporation | 1,372 mm | |
| Keiō Line | Keio Corporation | 1,372 mm | |
| Keiō New Line | Keio Corporation | 1,372 mm | |
| Sagamihara Line | Keio Corporation | 1,372 mm | |
| Takao Line | Keio Corporation | 1,372 mm | |
| Kokura Line | Kitakyushu monorail | Straddle-beam monorail | Side contact |
| Disney Resort Line | Maihama Resort Line | Straddle-beam monorail | Side contact |
| Okinawa Urban Monorail Line | Okinawa Urban Monorail | Straddle-beam monorail | Side contact |
| Main Line | Osaka Monorail | Straddle-beam monorail | Side contact |
| Saito Line | Osaka Monorail | Straddle-beam monorail | Side contact |
| Sapporo Municipal Subway Tōhō Line | Sapporo City Transportation Bureau | Rubber-tyred metro | |
| Sapporo Municipal Subway Tōzai Line | Sapporo City Transportation Bureau | Rubber-tyred metro | |
| Enoshima Line | Shonan Monorail | Suspended monorail | Side contact |
| Tama Toshi Monorail Line | Tama Toshi Monorail | Straddle-beam monorail | Side contact |
| Toei Shinjuku Line | Tokyo Metropolitan Bureau of Transportation | 1,372 mm | |

== AC electrified ==
=== 600 V 50 Hz ===
| Name | Operator | Gauge | Notes |
|---|---|---|---|
| New Shuttle | Saitama New Urban Transit | People mover | three–phase, side contact |
| Nippori-Toneri Liner | Tokyo Metropolitan Bureau of Transportation | People mover | three–phase, side contact |
| Tokyo Waterfront New Transit Waterfront Line | Yurikamome | People mover | three–phase, side contact |

=== 600 V 60 Hz ===
| Name | Operator | Gauge | Notes |
|---|---|---|---|
| Nankō Port Town Line | Osaka Metro | People mover | three–phase, side contact |
| Port Island Line | Kobe New Transit | People mover (2,430 mm width track) | three–phase, side contact |
| Rokkō Island Line | Kobe New Transit | People mover | three–phase, side contact |

=== 20 kV, 50 Hz ===
| Name | Operator | Gauge | Notes |
|---|---|---|---|
| Chitose Line | JR Hokkaido | 1,067 mm | Include Chitose Airport branch |
| Hakodate Main Line (Hakodate – Shin-Hakodate-Hokuto, Otaru – Asahikawa) | JR Hokkaido | 1,067 mm | Shin-Hakodate-Hokuto – Otaru section is not electrified |
| Kaikyō Line (Naka-Oguni – Shin-nakaoguni signal base) | JR Hokkaido | 1,067 mm | Dead section within Shin-nakaoguni signal base, 25 kV electrified north of dead section, only freight trains and Train Suite Shikishima cruise train may run after 2016 |
| Muroran Main Line (Muroran – Higashi-Muroran – Numanohata) | JR Hokkaido | 1,067 mm | Oshamambe – Higashi-Muroran, and Numanohata – Iwamizawa section is not electrified |
| Sasshō Line | JR Hokkaido | 1,067 mm | All non-electrified sections are abandoned in 2020 |
| Sōya Main Line (Asahikawa – Kita-Asahikawa Freight Terminal) | JR Hokkaido | 1,067 mm | Only for dead mileage purpose of Hakodate Main Line trains, and for freight trains, passenger trains of Sōya Main Line are using DMUs, as the rest of line is not electrified |
| Akita Shinkansen | JR East | 1,435 mm | Mini-Shinkansen, concurrent with Tazawako Line (nearly all line) and Ōu Main Line (Ōmagari – Akita) |
| Banetsu West Line (Kōriyama – Kitakata) | JR East | 1,067 mm | As of 2022, no EMUs are running west of Aizu-Wakamatsu, Aizu-Wakamatsu – Kitakata electrification is therefore planned to be abandoned, the rest of line are not electrified |
| Jōban Line (Fujishiro – Iwanuma) | JR East | 1,067 mm | Dead section between Toride – Fujishiro, 1,500 V electrified south of the dead section |
| Mito Line (Otabayashi – Tomobe) | JR East | 1,067 mm | Dead section between Oyama – Otabayashi, 1500 V electrified near the Oyama Station |
| Oga Line (within Oga Station, for charging purpose) | JR East | 1,067 mm | While not de jure considered electrified line, all trains are using battery EMU |
| Ōu Main Line | JR East | Mixed 1,067 mm and 1,435 mm in different sections (see the line article) | except the mainly-freight transport Tsuchizaki – Akita Port section which is not electrified Concurrent with Yamagata Shinkansen (Fukushima – Shinjō) and Akita Shinkansen (Ōmagari – Akita) |
| Senzan Line | JR East | 1,067 mm | |
| Tazawako Line | JR East | 1,435 mm | Concurrent with Akita Shinkansen (nearly all line) |
| Tōhoku Main Line (Takaku – Morioka) | JR East | 1,067 mm | Except Senseki-Tōhoku Line connection (Matsushima – Takagimachi) which is not electrified, dead section between Kuroiso – Takaku, 1500 V electrified south of the dead section |
| Tsugaru Line (Aomori – Shin-nakaoguni signal base) | JR East | 1,067 mm | Tsugaru Line trains north of Kanita are using DMUs, the electrification north of Kanita is for Kaikyō Line trains (see above) |
| Uetsu Main Line (Majima – Akita) | JR East | 1,435 mm | Except freight-only Sakata – Sakatakō, dead section between Murakami – Majima, 1,500 V electrified southwest of the dead section |
| Yamagata Shinkansen | JR East | 1,435 mm | Mini-Shinkansen, concurrent with Ōu Main Line (Fukushima – Shinjō) |
| Abukuma Express Line | AbukumaExpress | 1,067 mm | |
| Aoimori Railway Line | Aoimori Railway | 1,067 mm | formerly part of Tohoku Main Line until 2010 |
| Iwate Galaxy Railway Line | IGR Iwate Galaxy Railway | 1,067 mm | formerly part of Tohoku Main Line until 2002 |
| Tsukuba Express (Miraidaira – Tsukuba) | Metropolitan Intercity Railway Company | 1,067 mm | Dead section between Moriya – Miraidaira, 1,500 V electrified south of the dead section |
| Sendai Airport Line | Sendai Airport Transit | 1,067 mm | |
| South Hokkaido Railway Line (Satsukari – Goryōkaku) | South Hokkaido Railway | 1,067 mm | Dead section between Kikonai – Satsukari, 25 kV electrified west of dead section, passenger trains (except Train Suite Shikishima cruise train) are using DMU, while freight trains are drag by electric locomotives formerly part of Esashi Line until 2016 |

=== 20 kV, 60 Hz ===
| Name | Operator | Gauge | Notes |
|---|---|---|---|
| Hokuriku Main Line (Minami-Imajō – Kanazawa) | JR West | 1,067 mm | Dead section between Tsuruga – Minami-Imajō, 1500 V electrified southwest of the dead section |
| Nanao Line (within Tsubata) | JR West | 1,067 mm | Dead section between Tsubata – Naka-Tsubata, 1500 V electrified north of the dead section |
| Chikuhō Main Line (Orio – Keisen) part of Fukuhoku Yutaka Line on the electrified section | JR Kyushu | 1,067 mm | Wakamatsu – Orio, and Keisen – Haruda sections are not electrified, but for the first non-electrified section, all trains are using battery EMUs since 2016 |
| Hōhi Main Line (Kumamoto – Higo-Ōzu, Shimogōri signal base – Ōita) | JR Kyushu | 1,067 mm | The second electrified section is a dead mileage purpose section for Nippō Main Line trains, Hōhi Main Line trains east of Higo-Ōzu are DMUs, as Higo-Ōzu – Shimogōri is not electrified |
| Kagoshima Main Line | JR Kyushu | 1,067 mm | |
| Kashii Line (within Kashii Station, for charging purpose) | JR Kyushu | 1,067 mm | While not de jure considered electrified line, all trains are using battery EMU |
| Miyazaki Kūkō Line | JR Kyushu | 1,067 mm | |
| Nagasaki Main Line (Tosu – Hizen-Hama) | JR Kyushu | 1,067 mm | South of the Hizen-Hama, the main route was electrified during 1976–2022, abandoned due to opening of the Nishi Kyushu Shinkansen, now being demolished, the old route (Nagayo branch) was never electrified |
| Nichinan Line (Minami-Miyazaki – Tayoshi) | JR Kyushu | 1,067 mm | The rest of Nichinan Line is not electrified |
| Nippō Main Line | JR Kyushu | 1,067 mm | |
| Ōmura Line (Haiki – Huis Ten Bosch) | JR Kyushu | 1,067 mm | The line south of Huis Ten Bosch is not electrified |
| San'yō Main Line (within Moji Station) | JR Kyushu | 1,067 mm | Dead section between Shimonoseki – Moji (at Kyushu gate of Kanmon Railway Tunnel), 1500 V electrified north of the dead section (see above) |
| Sasaguri Linepart of Fukuhoku Yutaka Line | JR Kyushu | 1,067 mm | |
| Sasebo Line | JR Kyushu | 1,067 mm | |
| Ainokaze Toyama Railway Line | Ainokaze Toyama Railway | 1,067 mm | was a part of Hokuriku Main Line until 2015 |
| Nihonkai Hisui Line (Ichiburi – Echigo Oshiage Hisui Kaigan) | Echigo Tokimeki Railway | 1,067 mm | Dead section between Echigo Oshiage Hisui Kaigan – Kajiyashiki, 1500 V electrified east of the dead section, was a part of Hokuriku Main Line until 2015 |
| Hisatsu Orange Railway Line | Hisatsu Orange Railway | 1,067 mm | was a part of Kagoshima Main Line until 2004, except the 36plus3 limited express and freight trains, all other passenger trains are using DMUs |
| IR Ishikawa Railway Line | IR Ishikawa Railway | 1,067 mm | was a part of Hokuriku Main Line until 2015 |

=== 25 kV, 50 Hz ===
| Name | Operator | Gauge | Notes |
|---|---|---|---|
| Hokkaido Shinkansen | JR Hokkaido | 1,435 mm | Concurrent with Kaikyō Line between Shin-nakaoguni signal base – Yunosato-Shiriuchi signal base |
| Kaikyō Line (Shin-nakaoguni signal base – Kikonai) | JR Hokkaido | 1,067 mm | Dead section within Shin-nakaoguni signal base, 20 kV electrified south of dead section, only freight trains and Train Suite Shikishima cruise train may run after 2016 Concurrent with Hokkaido Shinkansen between Shin-nakaoguni signal base – Yunosato-Shiriuchi signal base |
| Jōetsu Shinkansen | JR East | 1,435 mm | |
| Tōhoku Shinkansen | JR East | 1,435 mm | has connections with two Mini-Shinkansens above, and hence dead sections on both connection points |
| Hokuriku Shinkansen (Tokyo – Karuizawa, Jōetsumyōkō – Itoigawa) | JR East, JR West | 1,435 mm | |
| South Hokkaido Railway Line (near Kikonai station) | South Hokkaido Railway | 1,067 mm | Dead section between Kikonai – Satsukari, 20 kV electrified east of dead section, passenger trains (except Train Suite Shikishima cruise train) are using DMU, while freight trains are drag by electric locomotives formerly part of Esashi Line until 2016 |

=== 25 kV, 60 Hz ===
| Name | Operator | Gauge | Notes |
|---|---|---|---|
| Hokuriku Shinkansen (Karuizawa – Jōetsumyōkō, Itoigawa – Tsuruga) | JR East, JR West | 1,435 mm | |
| Tōkaidō Shinkansen | JR Central | 1,435 mm | |
| Sanyō Shinkansen | JR West | 1,435 mm | |
| Kyushu Shinkansen | JR Kyushu | 1,435 mm | |
| Nishi Kyushu Shinkansen | JR Kyushu | 1,435 mm | |
