= Higashi-fuchū Station =

Railway station in Fuchū, Tokyo, Japan

Higashi-fuchū Station 東府中駅

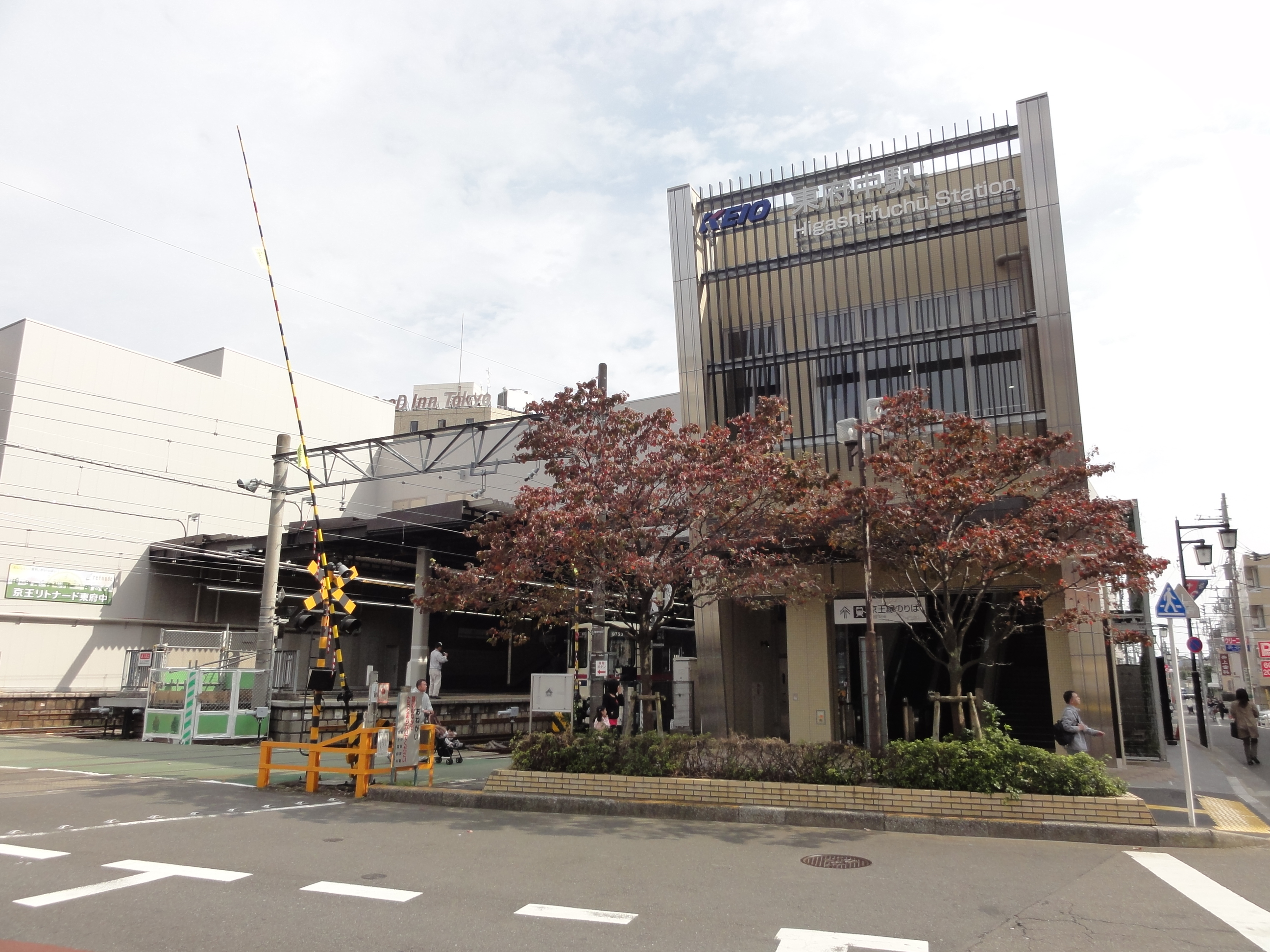
- Higashi-fuchū Station, South exit, October 2010

General information
- Location: 1-8-3 Shimizugaoka, Fuchū-shi, Tokyo 183-0015; Japan
- Coordinates: 35.6689°N 139.4953°E
- Operator: Keio Corporation
- Lines: Keio Line; Keiō Keibajō Line
- Distance: 20.4 km from Shinjuku
- Platforms: 1 side platform + 1 island platform
- Tracks: 4

Other information
- Station code: KO23
- Website: Official website

History
- Opened: 12 November 1935; 90 years ago
- Former names: Rinji Keibajomae Station (to 1940)

Passengers
- FY2019: 21,274 (daily)

Services
Preceding station	Keio Corporation	Following station
Fuchū towards Keiō-hachiōji	Keiō Line Express Semi Express	Chōfu towards Shinjuku
Fuchū towards Keiō-hachiōji	Keiō Line Rapid Local	Tama-reien towards Shinjuku
Fuchūkeiba-seimommae One-way operation	Keibajō Line Special Express	Chōfu Terminus
Fuchūkeiba-seimommae One-way operation	Keibajō Line Express	through to Keiō Line
Fuchūkeiba-seimommae Terminus	Keibajō Line Local	Terminus
Location
- Location within Tokyo Location within Japan

Higashi-fuchū Station (東府中駅, Higashi-fuchū-ek) is a junction passenger railway station located in the city of Fuchū, Tokyo, Japan, operated by the private railway operator Keio Corporation.

== Lines ==
Higashi-fuchū Station is served by the Keiō Line and the Keiō Keibajō Line. It is located 20.4 km from the Keiō Line's Tokyo terminus at Shinjuku, and is a terminus of the Keiō Keibajō Line.

== Station layout ==
This station consists of one island platform and one side platform serving four tracks, with an elevated station building located above.

=== Platforms ===
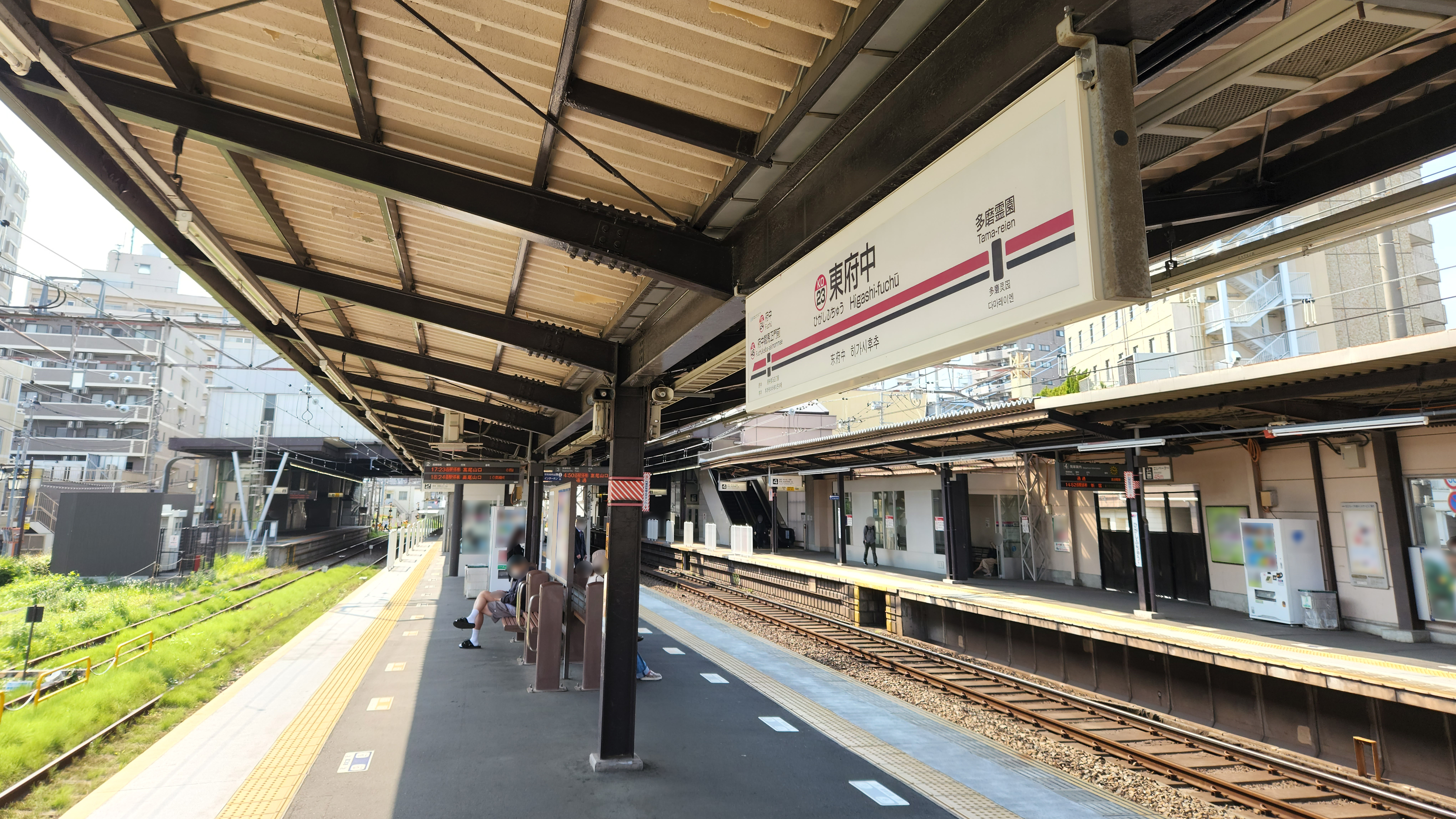
Tracks and platforms of Higashi-fuchū Station, May 2022

1	Keiō Keibajō Line	for Fuchūkeiba-seimommae (weekdays)
2	Keiō Keibajō Line	for Fuchūkeiba-seimommae (weekends)
2	Keiō Line	for Keiō-Hachiōji; Keiō Dōbutsuen Line for Tama-Dōbutsukōen (via Takahatafudō); Keiō Takao Line for Takaosanguchi (via Kitano)
3	Keiō Line	for Keiō-Hachiōji; Keiō Dōbutsuen Line for Tama-Dōbutsukōen (via Takahatafudō); Keiō Takao Line for Takaosanguchi (via Kitano)
4	Keiō Line	for Chōfu, Meidaimae, Sasazuka, and Shinjuku; Toei Shinjuku Line for Moto-Yawata

== History ==
The station opened on 12 November 1935. as Rinji Keibajomae Station (臨時競馬場前駅). It was renamed to its present name on 26 October 1940.

== Passenger statistics ==
In fiscal 2019, the station was used by an average of 21,274 passengers daily.

The passenger figures (boarding passengers only) for previous years are as shown below.

Fiscal year	daily average
2005	18,638
2010	19,527
2015	20,793

== Surrounding area ==
- Tokyo Racecourse

== See also ==
- List of railway stations in Japan
