= Fujisakigū-mae Station =

Railway station located in Kumamoto City, Kumamoto

Fujisakigū-mae Station 藤崎宮前駅
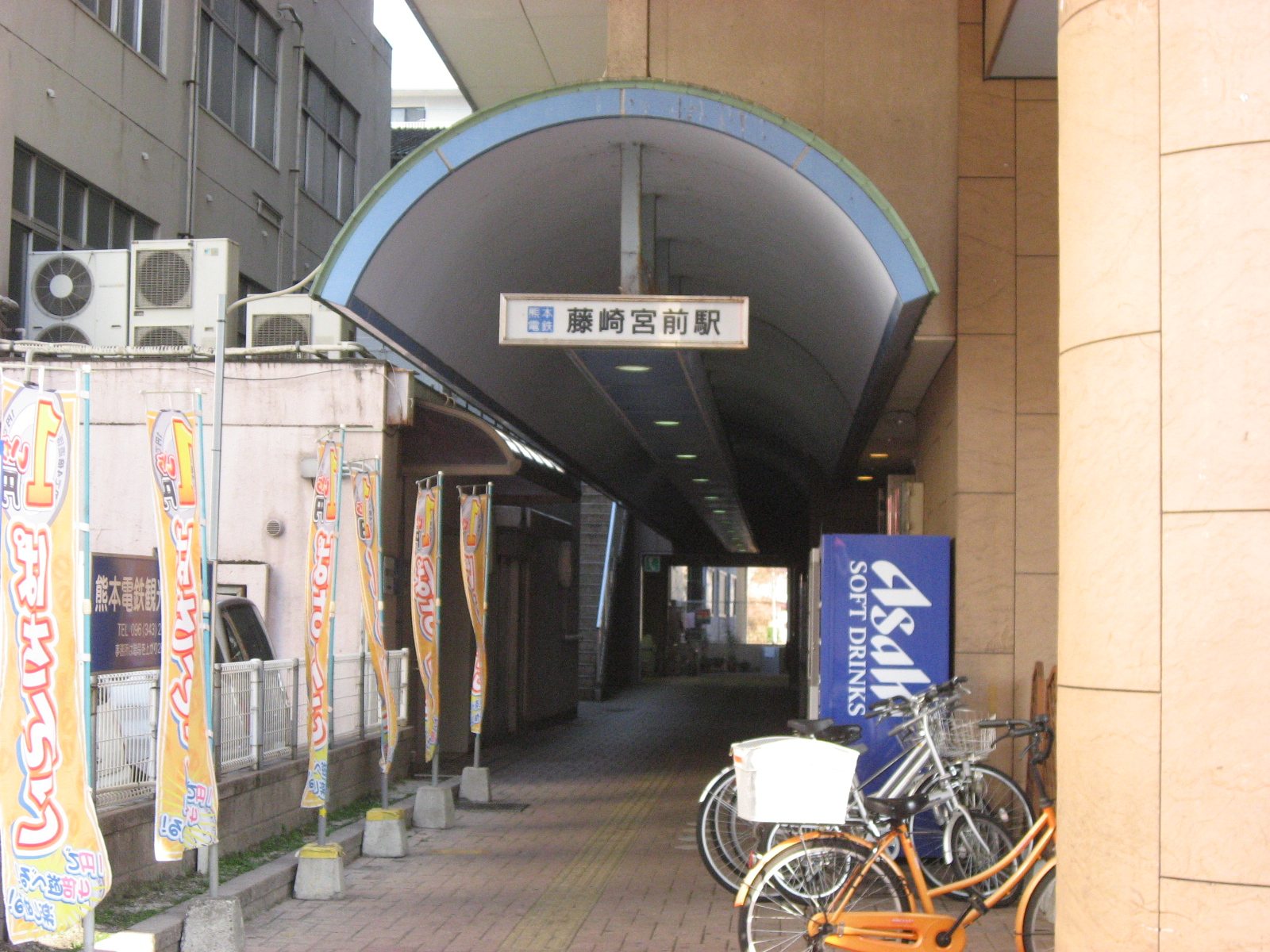
- Fujisakigū-mae Station entrance

General information
- Location: 2-chōme-2 Tsuboi, Chuo-ku, Kumamoto-shi, Kumamoto-ken, 860-0863; Japan
- Coordinates: 32.8092°N 130.7133°E
- Operator: Kumamoto Electric Railway
- Line: ■ Fujisaki Line
- Distance: 2.3 km from Kami-Kumamoto
- Platforms: 1 bay platform

Other information
- Station code: KD06

History
- Opened: 1 October 1911
- Former names: Hiromachi (to 1924)

Passengers
- FY2018: 2195

Services
Preceding station	Kumamoto Electric Railway	Following station
Terminus	Fujisaki Line	Kurokamimachi towards Kita-Kumamoto
Location
- Location within Kumamoto Prefecture Location within Japan

Fujisakigū-mae Station (藤崎宮前駅, Fujisakigū-mae-eki) is a passenger railway station located in the Kita-ku ward of the city of Kumamoto, Kumamoto Prefecture, Japan. It is operated by the private transportation company Kumamoto Electric Railway.

== Lines ==
The station is the terminus of the Fujisaki Line and is located 2.3 km from the opposing terminus of the line at Kami-Kumamoto. Only local trains serve the station.

== Layout ==
Fujisakigū-mae Station is a ground-level station with one bay platform with one side used for boarding and the other for alighting. The station building is an eleven-story structure with a parking lot on the third to ninth floors.

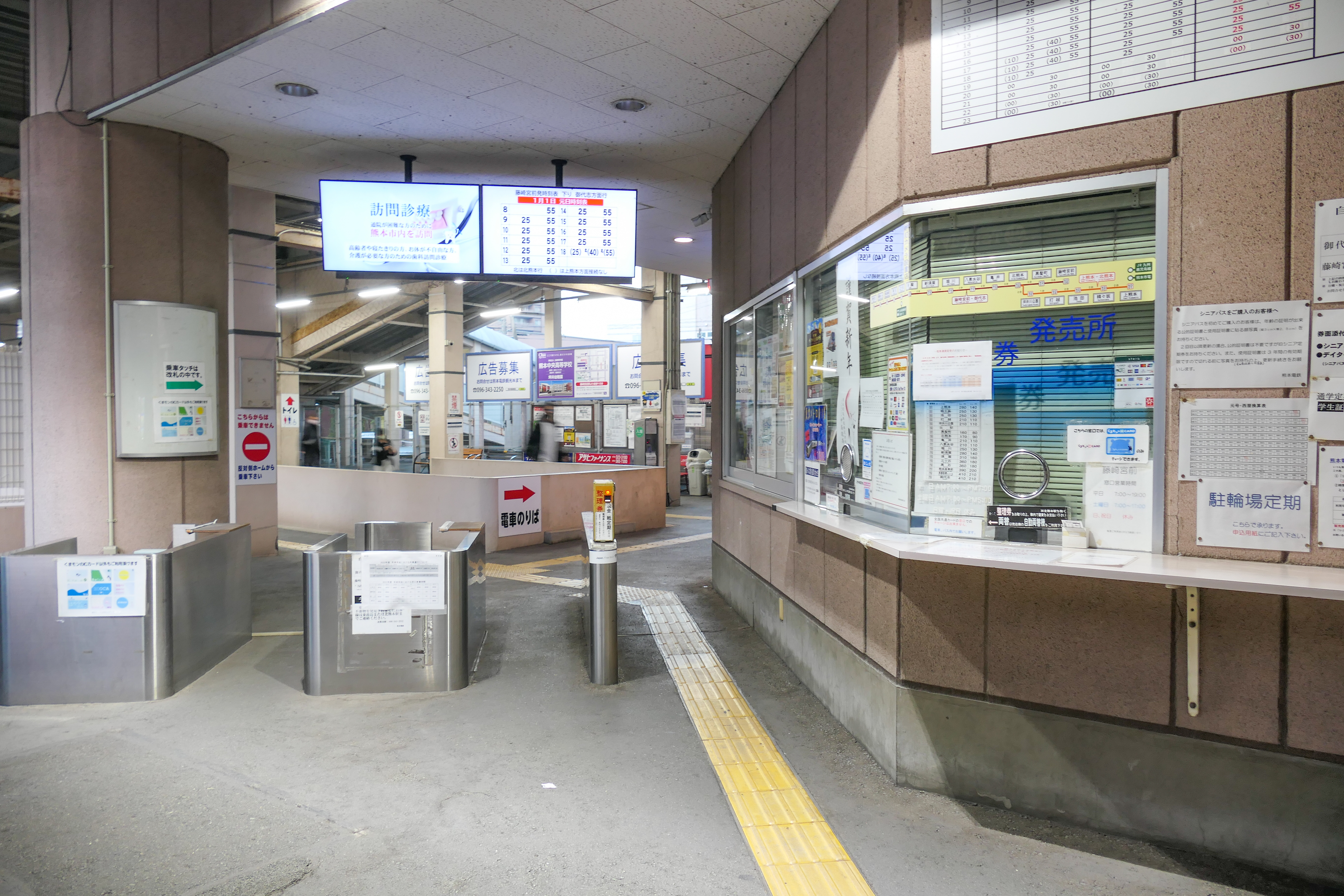
Exit Gate

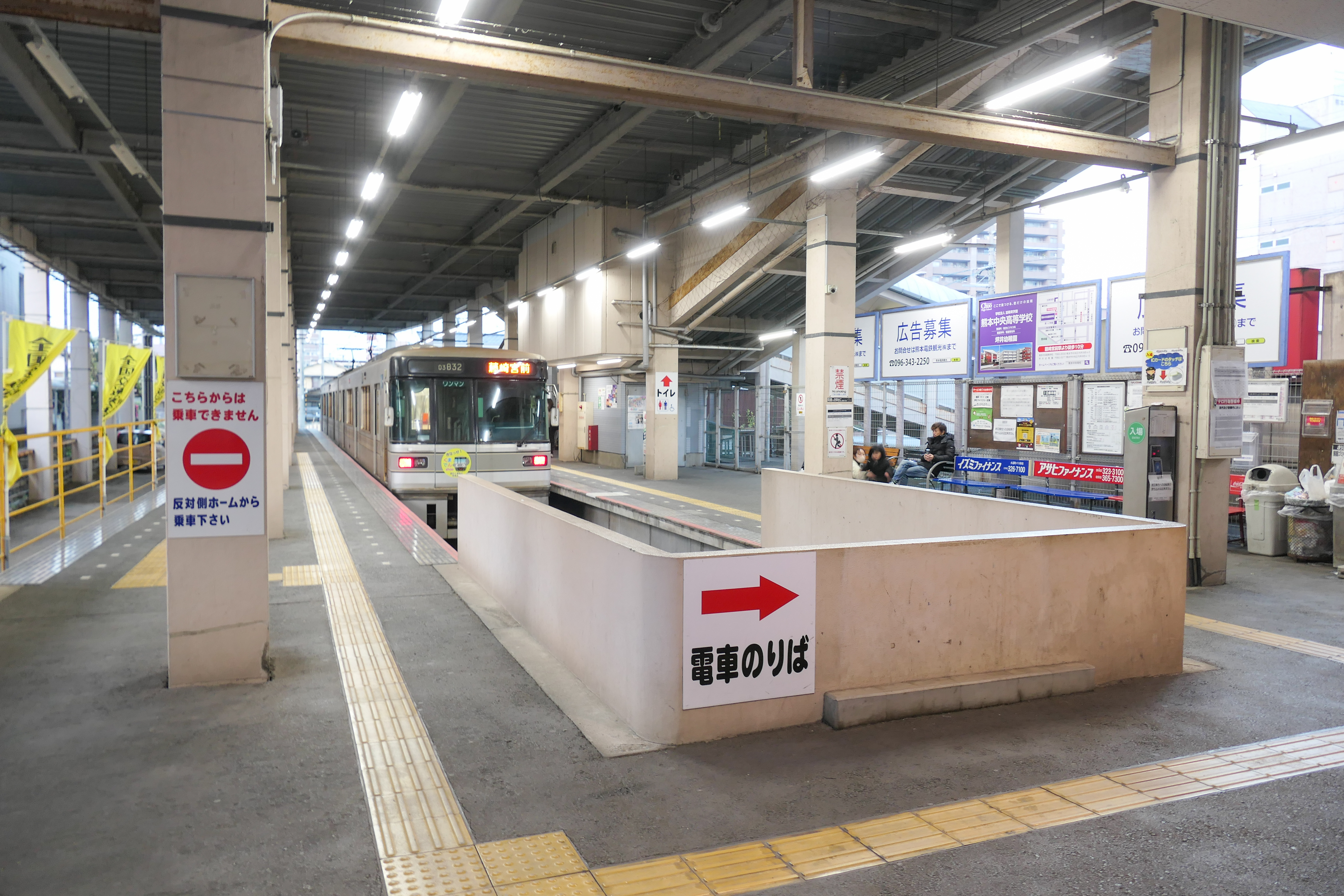
Bay platform

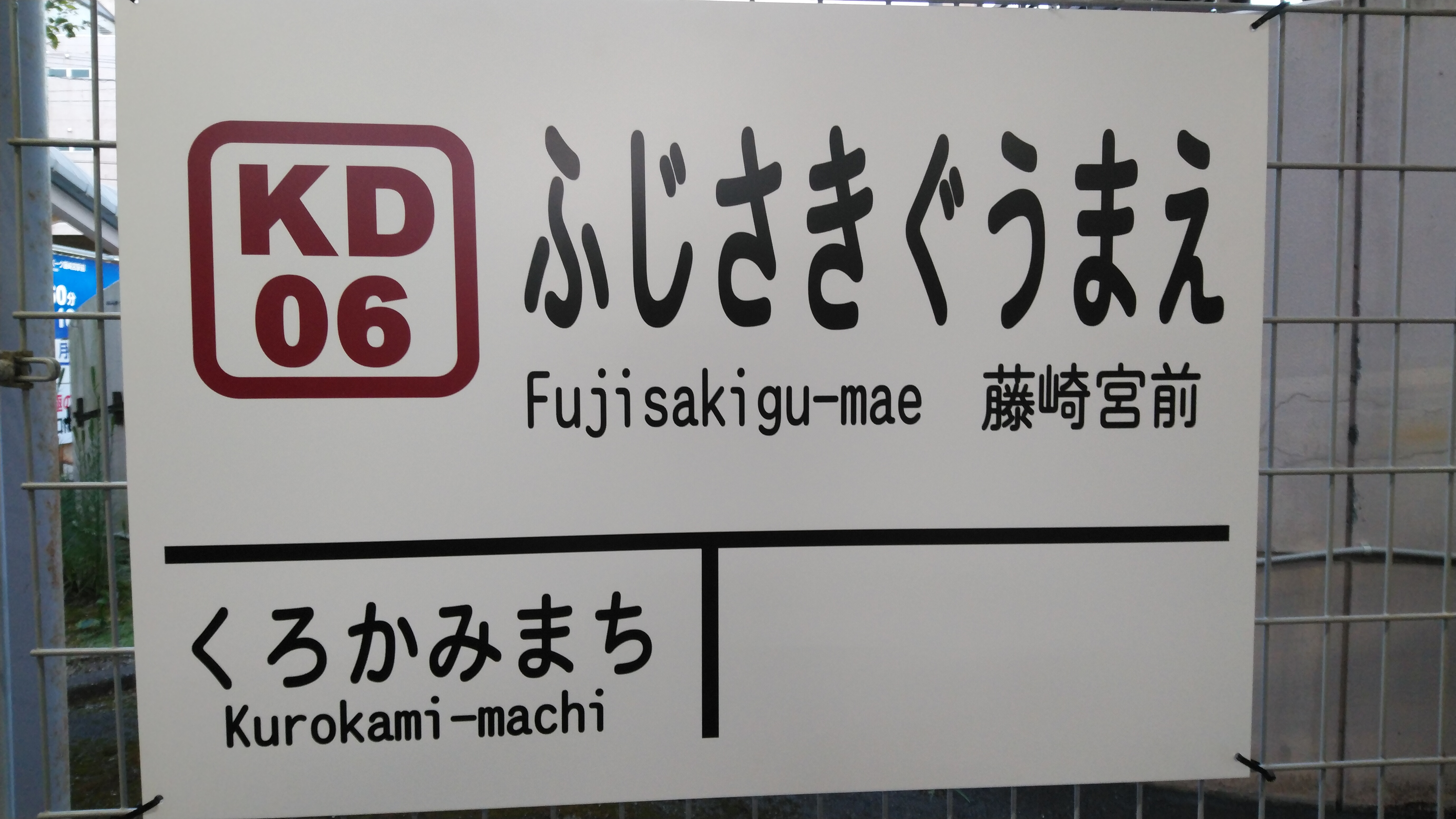
Signage

== History ==
The station was opened on 1 October 1911 as the Kita-Sentanbatake Stop (北千反畑停留場) and was renamed the Hiromachi Stop (広町停留場) on 2 August 1913. It was elevated to a full station on 27 August 1913, becoming Hiromachi Station (広町駅). It was renamed to its present name in 1924.

== Passenger statistics ==
In fiscal year 2018 the station was used by an average of 2195 passengers daily.

== Surrounding area ==
- Kumamoto City Tsuboya Elementary School
- Kumamoto Castle
- Fujisaki Hachimangū

== See also ==
- List of railway stations in Japan
