= Kurokamimachi Station =

Railway station located in Kumamoto City, Kumamoto

Kurokamimachi Station 黒髪町駅
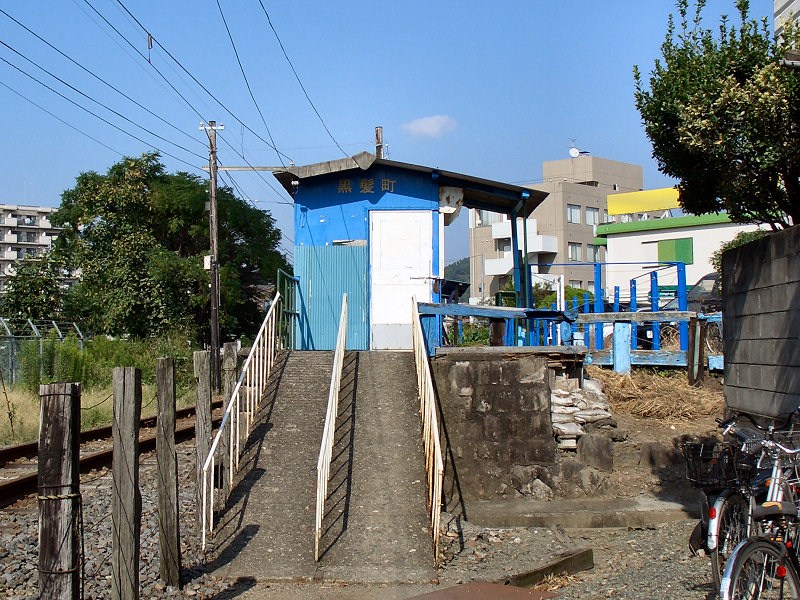
- Station entrance

General information
- Location: 6-chōme-21 Tsuboi, Chuo-ku, Kumamoto-shi, Kumamoto-ken, 860-0863; Japan
- Coordinates: 32.8183°N 130.7172°E
- Operator: Kumamoto Electric Railway
- Line: ■ Fujisaki Line
- Distance: 1.2 km from Kami-Kumamoto
- Platforms: 1 side platform

Other information
- Station code: KD07

History
- Opened: 25 October 1951

Passengers
- FY2018: 589

Services
Preceding station	Kumamoto Electric Railway	Following station
Fujisakigū-mae Terminus	Fujisaki Line	Kita-Kumamoto Terminus
Location
- Location within Kumamoto Prefecture Location within Japan

Kurokamimachi Station (黒髪町駅, Kurokamimachi-eki) is a passenger railway station located in the Chuo-ku ward of the city of Kumamoto, Kumamoto Prefecture, Japan. It is operated by the private transportation company Kumamoto Electric Railway.

== Lines ==
The station is served by the Fujisaki Line and is located 1.2 bsp;km from the starting point of the line at Kami-Kumamoto.Only local trains serve the station

== Layout ==
Kurokamimachi Station is a ground-level station with one side platform. The station is unattended.

== History ==
The station was opened on 25 October 1951.

== Passenger statistics ==
In fiscal 2018 the station was used by an average of 589 passengers daily.

== Surrounding area ==
- Kumamoto Prefectural Seiseiko High School
- Kumamoto Municipal Kurokami Elementary School
- Kumamoto Municipal Hiyorikan High School

== See also ==
- List of railway stations in Japan
