= Fuchūkeiba-seimommae Station =

Railway station in Fuchū, Tokyo, Japan

Fuchūkeiba-seimommae Station 府中競馬正門前駅

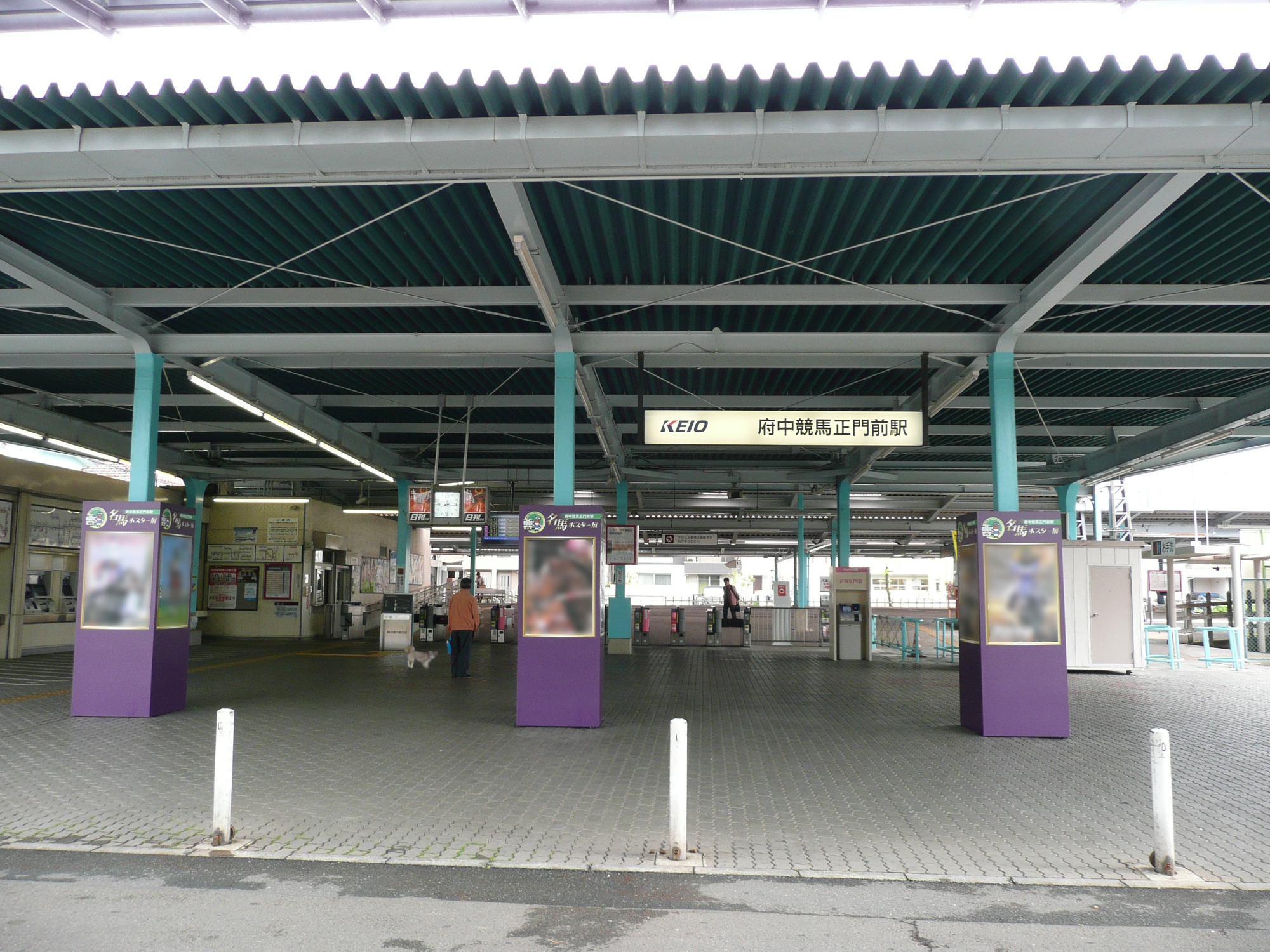
- Fuchūkeiba-seimommae Station

General information
- Location: 1-10 Hachiman-chō, Fuchū-shi, Tokyo 183-0016; Japan
- Coordinates: 35.668317°N 139.486036°E
- Operator: Keio Corporation
- Line: Keiō Keibajō Line
- Platforms: 1 bay platform

Other information
- Station code: KO46
- Website: Official website

History
- Opened: 29 April 1955

Passengers
- FY2019: 2,922 (daily)

Services
Preceding station	Keio Corporation	Following station
Terminus	Keibajō Line Special Express	Higashi-Fuchū towards Chōfu
Terminus	Keibajō Line Express Local	Higashi-Fuchū Terminus
Location
- Location within Tokyo Location within Japan

Fuchūkeiba-seimommae Station (府中競馬正門前駅, Fuchūkeiba-seimommae-eki) is a passenger railway station located in the city of Fuchū, Tokyo, Japan, operated by the private railway operator Keio Corporation. It is the main point of railway access to the Tokyo Racecourse.

== Lines ==
Fuchūkeiba-seimommae Station is the terminus of the Keiō Keibajō Line, a 0.9 kilometer spur line from Higashi-fuchū. The station is located 20.4 km from the Keiō Line's Tokyo terminus at Shinjuku.

== Services ==
During weekdays the station is served by two-car local trains operated to and from Higashi-Fuchū, while on weekends and holidays (as well as during events at the nearby Tokyo Racecourse) 8-car and 10-car local and express trains are operated through from the Keiō Line.

== Station layout ==
This station has a bay platform serving two tracks.

=== Platforms ===
1, 2	Keiō Keibajō Line	for Higashi-Fuchū; Keiō Line for Shinjuku; or Keiō-Hachiōji

== History ==
The station opened on 29 April 1955.

== Passenger statistics ==
In fiscal 2019, the station was used by an average of 2,922 passengers daily.

The passenger figures (boarding passengers only) for previous years are as shown below.

Fiscal year	daily average
2005	3,877
2010	3,163
2015	3,190

== Surrounding area ==
- Tokyo Racecourse
- Ōkunitama Shrine

== See also ==
- List of railway stations in Japan
