= Uramoto =

Uramoto（浦本）is a Japanese surname. The surname is the 95,020th most prevalent family name in the world It is held by approximately 1 in 1,454,600 people. This last name occurs predominantly in Asia, where 96 % of Uramoto live; 96 % live in East Asia and 96 % live in Nippon-Asia. Notable people with the surname include:

- Kentaro Uramoto (born 13 November 1982), Japanese footballer
- Naomichi Uramoto (born 24 July 1994), Japanese motorcycle racer

== See also ==
- Uramoto Station
