= Izumi-Sotoasahikawa Station =

Railway station in Akita, Japan

Izumi-Sotoasahikawa Station 泉外旭川駅
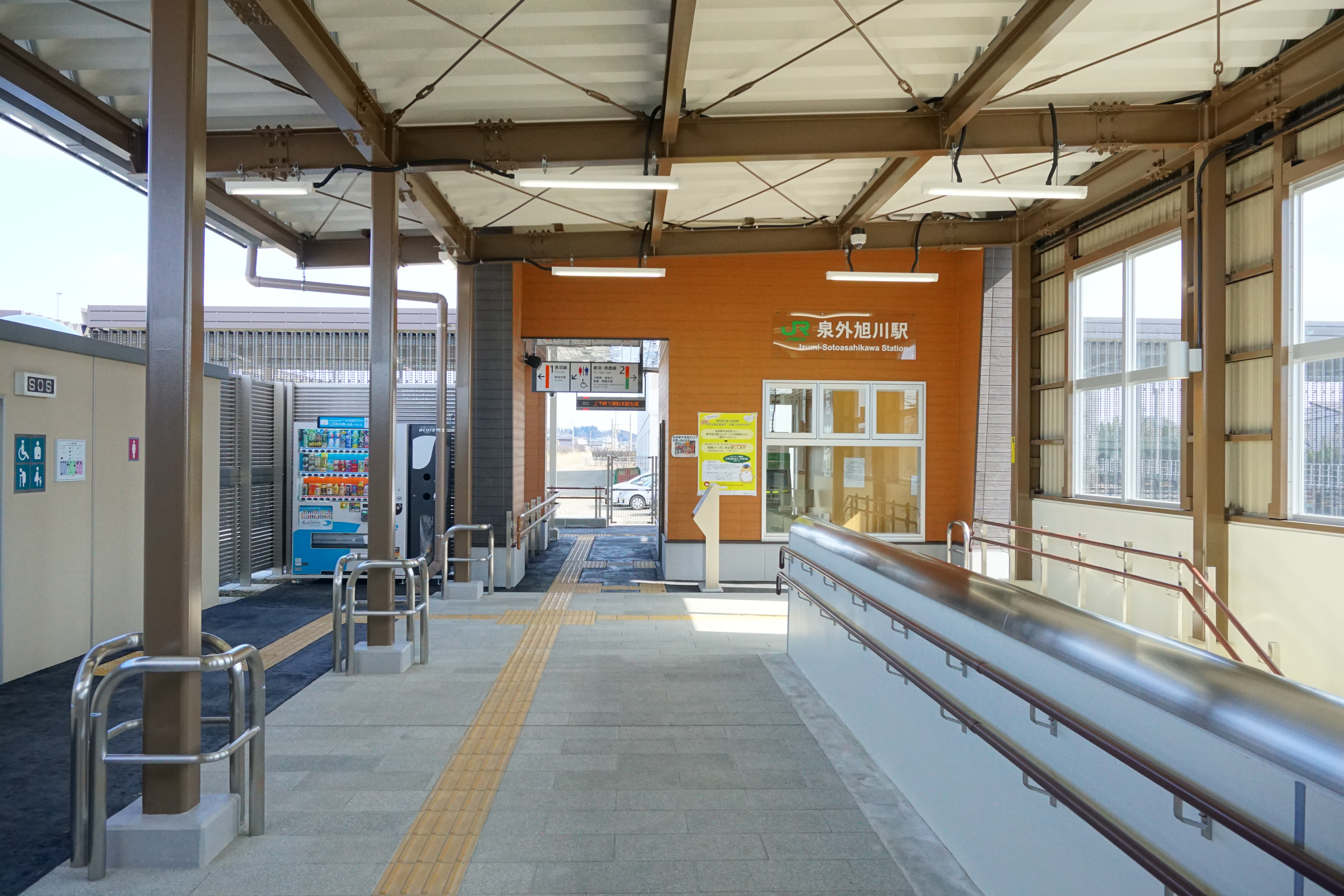
- Waiting room of Izumi-Sotoasahikawa Station in March 2021

General information
- Location: 2-18 Izumi-Sugano, Akita, Akita Prefecture 011-0946; Japan
- Coordinates: 39°44′18.06″N 140°06′43.85″E
- Operator: JR East; JR Freight
- Lines: ■ Ōu Main Line; ■ Oga Line
- Distance: 301.8 km from Fukushima
- Platforms: 1 island platform

Other information
- Website: Official website

History
- Opened: 13 March 2021

Services
Preceding station	JR East	Following station
Akita Terminus	Ōu Main Line Rapid	Tsuchizaki towards Aomori
Akita towards Shinjō	Ōu Main Line Local	Tsuchizaki towards Aomori
Akita Terminus	Oga Line	Tsuchizaki towards Oga
Location
- Location within Akita Prefecture Location within Japan

Izumi-Sotoasahikawa Station (泉外旭川駅, Izumi-Sotoasahikawa-eki) is a railway station in the city of Akita in Akita Prefecture, Japan, operated by East Japan Railway Company (JR East). The station was opened on 13 March 2021.

== Location ==
The distance between Akita Station and Tsuchizaki Station was 7.1 kilometers (4.4 mi). Local residents hoped to establish a new station because this distance was too long. The city of Akita considered building the station, the case for building the new station was aided due to the fact that it is located in Izumi Hightown where has been developed by Akita Prefecture. The Izumi Hightown development has increased population in the area around the station. The Akita Freight Terminal, operated by JR Freight, is also located near the station.

== Station layout ==
The station's ticket gate is located within an island platform placed between the inbound and outbound lines. It is accessed by an underpass that links the opposing sides of the station. The underpass is free to pass through to provide a pedestrian pathway across the rail line.

== History ==
The city of Akita initiated discussions about the establishment of what would become Izumi-Sotoasahikawa Station with JR East on 31 July 2018. On 18 September, JR East and Akita agreed to initiate construction of the station. On 18 January 2019, permission was granted by the Bureau of Transportation of Tohoku to establish the station. Construction began on the station on 7 December of the same year. On 20 February 2020 the station's name was decided on, it was officially designated as Izumi-Sotoasahikawa Station.

On 13 March 2021 the station was opened to passengers. Overall, it cost around 2.05 billion yen to build the station and its associated buildings, and these expenses were paid for by the city of Akita. The station is the most recent station to be opened in Akita Prefecture since Iwaki-Minato Station which opened in 2001.

The Rapid Resort Shirakami does not stop at the station.

== See also ==
- List of railway stations in Japan
