= Tsuchizaki Station =

Railway station in Akita, Akita Prefecture, Japan

Tsuchizaki Station 土崎駅
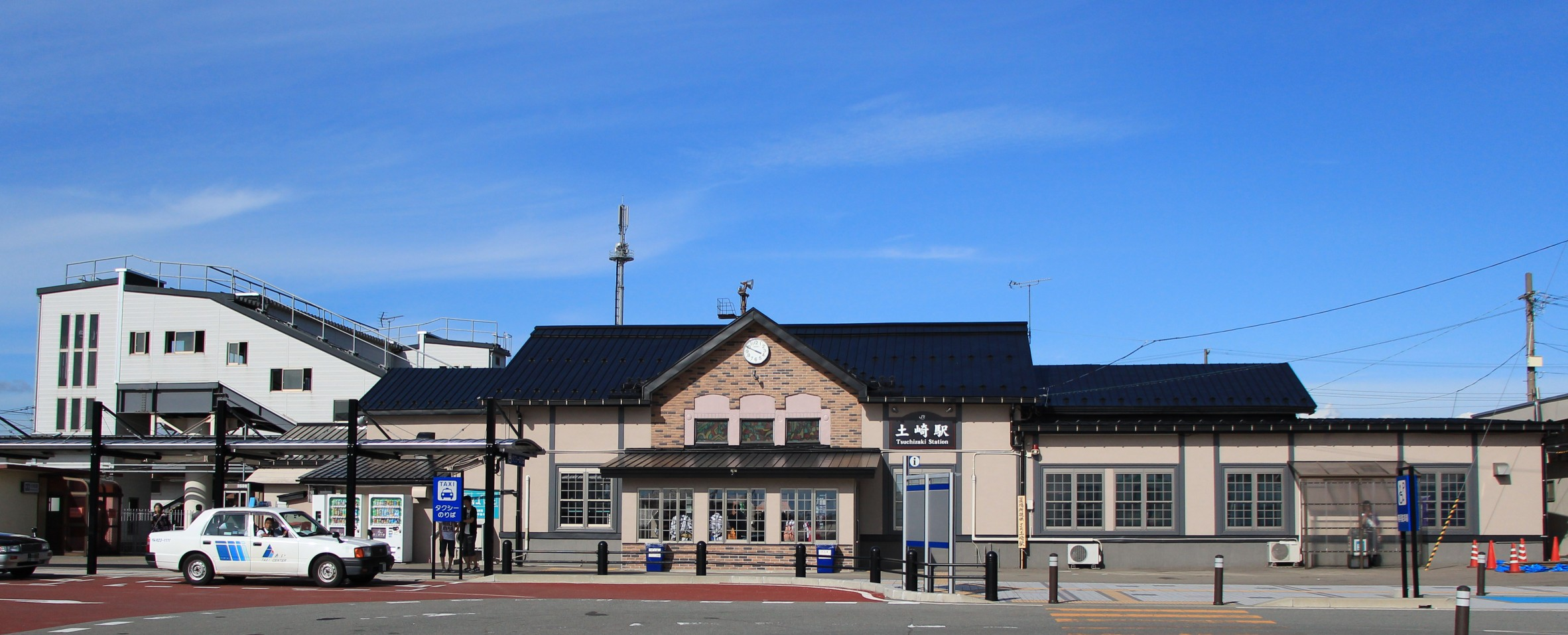
- Tsuchizaki Station in December 2012

General information
- Location: 6-16-15 Chūō, Tsuchizaki Minato, Akita-shi, Akita-ken 011-0946; Japan
- Coordinates: 39°45′30.44″N 140°4′24.98″E
- Operator: JR East; JR Freight
- Lines: ■ Ōu Main Line; ■ Oga Line
- Distance: 292.3 kilometers from Fukushima
- Platforms: 1 side + 1 island platform

Other information
- Website: Official website

History
- Opened: 21 October 1902

Passengers
- FY2018: 2076 daily

Services
Preceding station	JR East	Following station
Izumi-Sotoasahikawa towards Akita	Ōu Main Line Rapid	Kami-Iijima towards Aomori
Izumi-Sotoasahikawa towards Shinjō	Ōu Main Line Local	Kami-Iijima towards Aomori
Izumi-Sotoasahikawa towards Akita	Oga Line	Kami-Iijima towards Oga
Location
- Location within Akita Prefecture Location within Japan

Tsuchizaki Station (土崎駅, Tsuchizaki-eki) is a railway station in Tsuchizaki Minato, Akita City, Akita Prefecture, Japan, operated by East Japan Railway Company (JR East).The station is also a freight depot for the Japan Freight Railway Company (JR Freight).

== Lines ==
Tsuchizaki Station is served by the Ōu Main Line, and is located 292.3 km from the starting point of the line at Fukushima Station. The Oga Line train services also stop at this station, which is past the nominal terminus of the line at Oiwake.

There was a 1.8 km freight branch line from this station to Akita Port Station.

== Station layout ==
The station has two unnumbered opposed side platforms serving two tracks connected by a footbridge. The station is attended.

=== Platforms ===
west	■ Oga Line	for Oga
west	■ Ōu Main Line	for Higashi-Noshiro and Hirosaki
east	■ Ōu Main Line	for Akita and Ōmagari

== History ==
Tsuchizaki Station opened on 21 October 1902. The station was absorbed into the JR East network upon the privatization of JNR on 1 April 1987.

== Passenger statistics ==
In fiscal 2018, the station was used by an average of 2076 passengers daily (boarding passengers only).

== Surrounding area ==
- Japan Railway Tsuchizaki Factory
- Minato Castle
- Port of Akita
- Akita Port Tower Selion
- National Route 7
- Tsuchizaki Post Office
- Tsuchizaki Library

== See also ==
- List of railway stations in Japan
