= Echigo Oshiage Hisui Kaigan Station =

Railway station in the city of Itoigawa, Niigata, Japan

Echigo Oshiage Hisui Kaigan Station えちご押上ひすい海岸駅
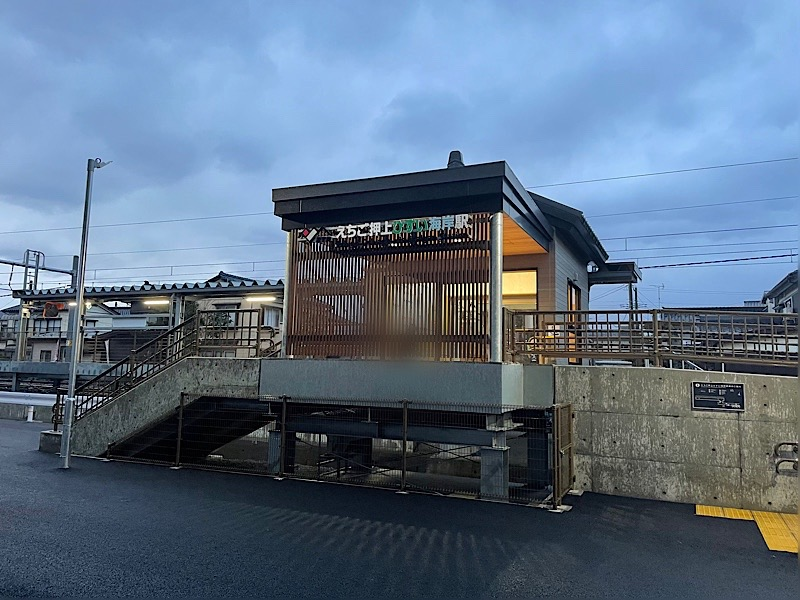

General information
- Location: 2–107, Oshiage, Itoigawa-shi, Niigata-ken; Japan
- Coordinates: 37.048070°N 137.878340°E
- Operator: Echigo Tokimeki Railway
- Line: ■ Nihonkai Hisui Line
- Platforms: 2 island platforms
- Tracks: 2

Other information
- Status: Unstaffed

History
- Opened: 13 March 2021

Passengers
- 2022: 91

Services
Preceding station	Echigo TOKImeki	Following station
Itoigawa towards Ichiburi	Nihonkai Hisui Line	Kajiyashiki towards Naoetsu
Location
- Location within Niigata Prefecture Location within Japan

Echigo Oshiage Hisui Kaigan Station (えちご押上ひすい海岸駅, Echigo Oshiage Hisui Kaigan-eki) is a railway station in the city of Itoigawa, Niigata, Japan, operated by Echigo Tokimeki Railway.

== Outline ==
After the Hokuriku Shinkansen was extended to Kanazawa Station, the parallel Hokuriku Main Line was transferred to the newly established third-sector public-private company, Echigo Tokimeki Railway. After the transfer, Niigata Prefecture and the railway company considered installing a new station near a local school and hospital to increase profits and break even with operational costs. In September 2019, MLIT approved the installation of the then tentatively named "Oshiage Shineki" station, which later became the Echigo Oshiage Hisui Kaigan Station. The cost of installing the new station was subsidized by JRTT and the local government.

== History ==
- 2019 - Approved by Bureau of Hokuriku Transportation to install a new station tentatively named Oshiage Shineki.
- 2020
  - 14 March - Started construction of the new station.
  - 10 June - Public survey conducted for a new station name
  - 9 August - The name Echigo Oshiage Hisui Kaigan Station was chosen based on the survey.
- 2021
  - 13 March 2021 - Opened for business.

== Surrounding area ==
- Hisui Coast
