= Keiō Keibajō Line =

Railway line in Fuchu, Tokyo, Japan

Keibajō Line

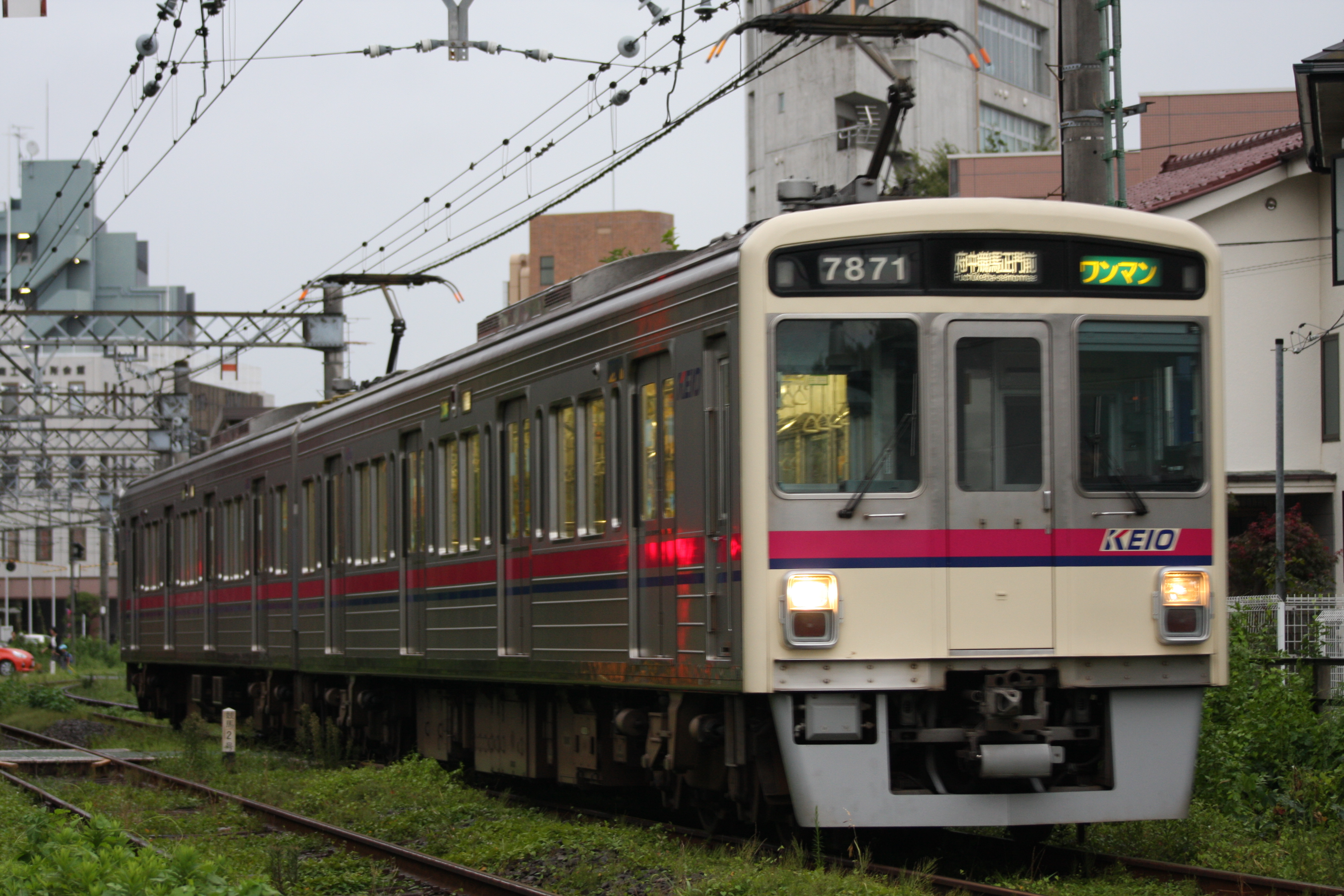

Overview
- Native name: 競馬場線
- Status: In service
- Owner: Keio Corporation
- Line number: KO
- Locale: Fuchū, Tokyo
- Termini: Higashi-Fuchū; Fuchū-Keiba-Seimon-mae
- Stations: 2

Service
- Type: Commuter rail
- System: Keio Electric Railway
- Operator: Keio Corporation
- Depot: None

History
- Opened: 29 April 1955; 71 years ago

Technical
- Line length: 900 m (3,000 ft; 0.56 mi)
- Num of tracks: Double-track
- Track gauge: 1,372 mm (4 ft 6 in)
- Minimum radius: 200 m (660 ft)
- Electrification: 1,500 V DC (overhead catenary)
- Operating speed: 70 km/h (45 mph)

The Keibajō Line (競馬場線, Keibajō-sen; "Racecourse Line") is a railway line in Fuchū, Tokyo, Japan, owned and operated by the private railway operator Keio Corporation. It connects Higashi-Fuchū on the Keiō Line and Fuchū-Keiba-Seimon-mae, and services the Tokyo Racecourse as well as the surrounding suburbs.

== Services ==
During weekdays served by two-car local trains goes back and forth between Higashi-Fuchū and Fuchūkeiba-seimommae, while on weekends and holidays (as well as during events at the nearby Tokyo Racecourse) 8-car and 10-car local and express trains are operated through from the Keiō Line.

== Stations ==
All stations are located in Fuchū, Tokyo.

No.	Name		Distance (km)		Transfers
No.	Name		From Higashi-Fuchū	From Shinjuku	Transfers
KO-23	Higashi-Fuchū	東府中	0.0	20.4	Keiō Line (KO23)
KO-46	Fuchūkeiba-seimommae	府中競馬正門前	0.9	21.3	

== History ==
The line opened on 29 April 1955 as dual track electrified at 600 VDC. The voltage was increased to 1500 VDC in 1963.
