= Akita Port Station =

Railway station in Akita, Japan

Akita Port Station 秋田港駅
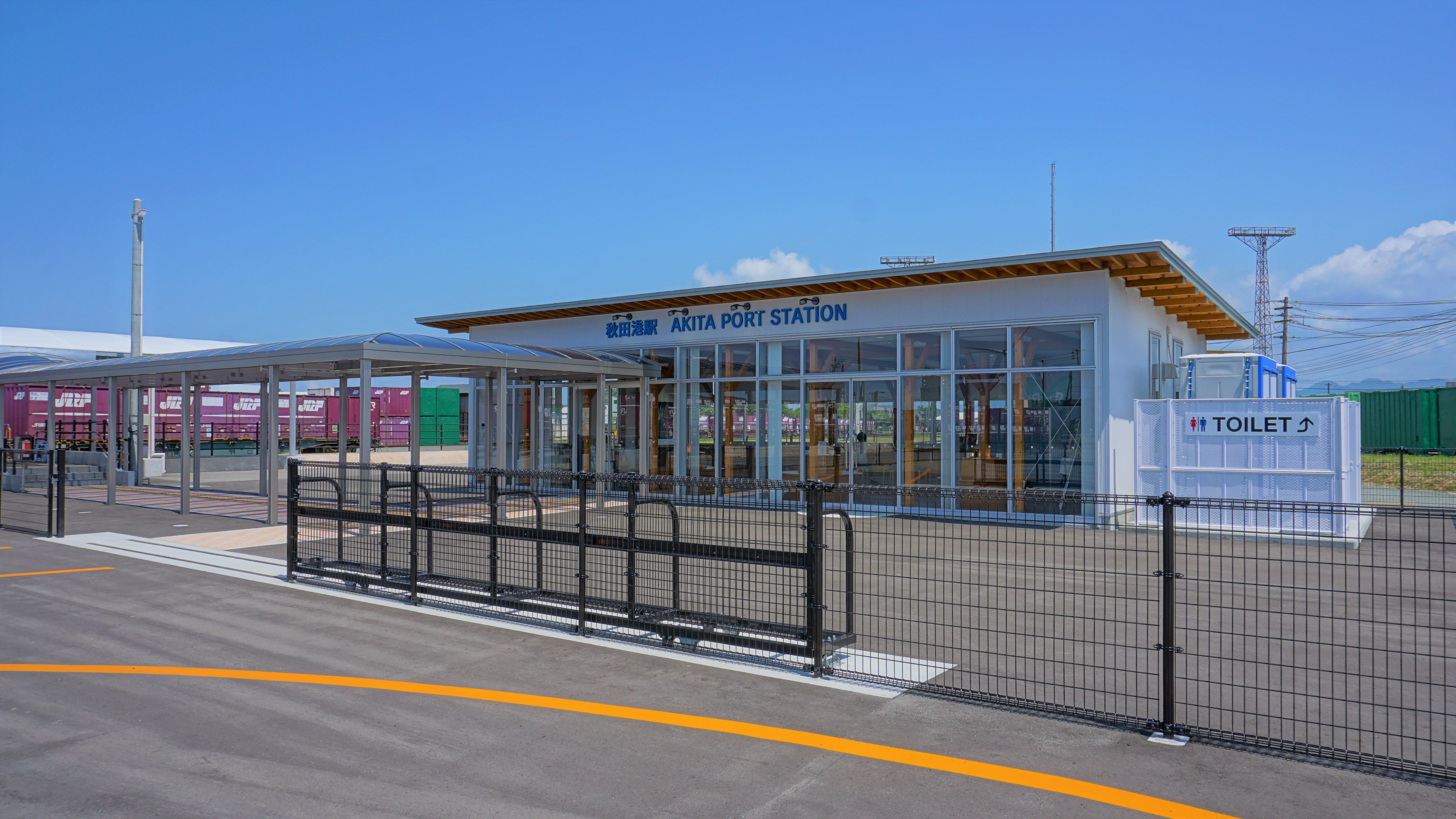
- The passenger station building in August 2019

General information
- Location: 1–12 Tsuchizaki Minato Nishi, Akita City, Akita Prefecture 011-0945; Japan
- Coordinates: 39°45′22.7″N 140°3′44.3″E
- Operator: JR Freight; JR East
- Line: ■ Ōu Main Line (Freight Branch Line)
- Distance: 1.8 km from Tsuchizaki
- Platforms: 1 side platform

History
- Opened: 15 October 1919
- Closed: 1 July 2026

Services
| Preceding station | JR East | Following station |
|---|---|---|
| Tsuchizaki Terminus | Ōu Main Line Freight Branch | Terminus |
Location
- Location within Akita Prefecture Location within Japan

Akita Port Station (秋田港駅, Akitakō-eki) is a former railway station in the city of Akita, Akita Prefecture, Japan, operated by Japan Freight Railway Company (JR Freight).

Although this station is basically a freight yard, East Japan Railway Company (JR East) conducts passenger business irregularly for cruise ship passengers calling at the Port of Akita.

== Departure and arrival of passenger trains exclusively for cruise passengers ==
From the beginning, it was a station that handled only freight, but in 2017, it departed and arrived at this station for cruise liner passengers calling at Port of Akita. It was announced that it would operate a passenger train connecting to Akita Station, and a temporary boarding and alighting tarp would be installed to hold the Akita Kantō on 3–6 August. A total of 5 round-trip trains were tested during the period. Passengers are limited to cruise liners, and it is the first case in Japan to use a freight line to transport cruise ship passengers.

In 2018, JR East obtained a second-class railway business license for a limited period and prepared a full-scale platform compatible with 4-car trains. From 18 April, a dedicated Joyful Train vehicle was used to start full-scale operation.

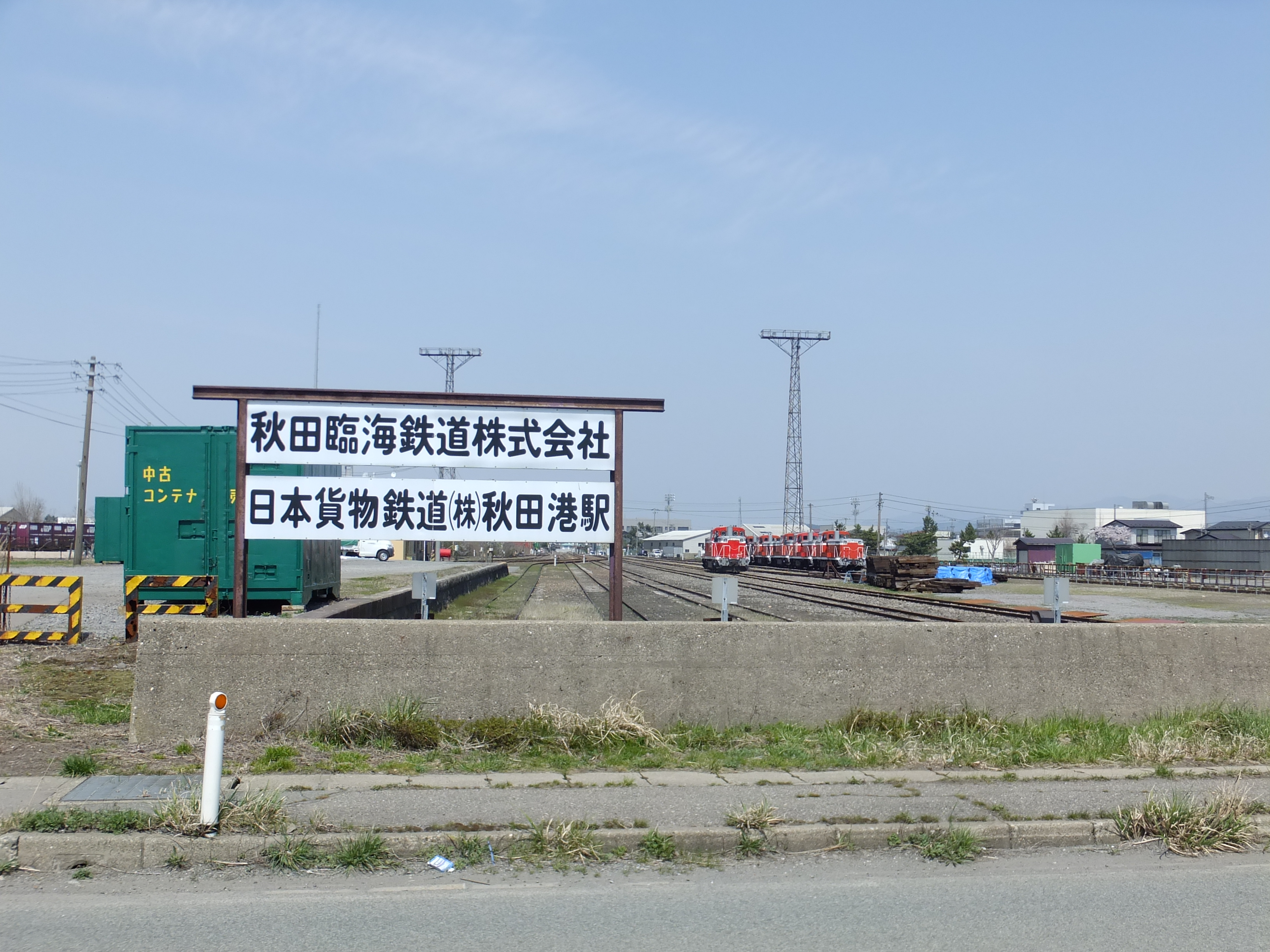
Former cargo handling area

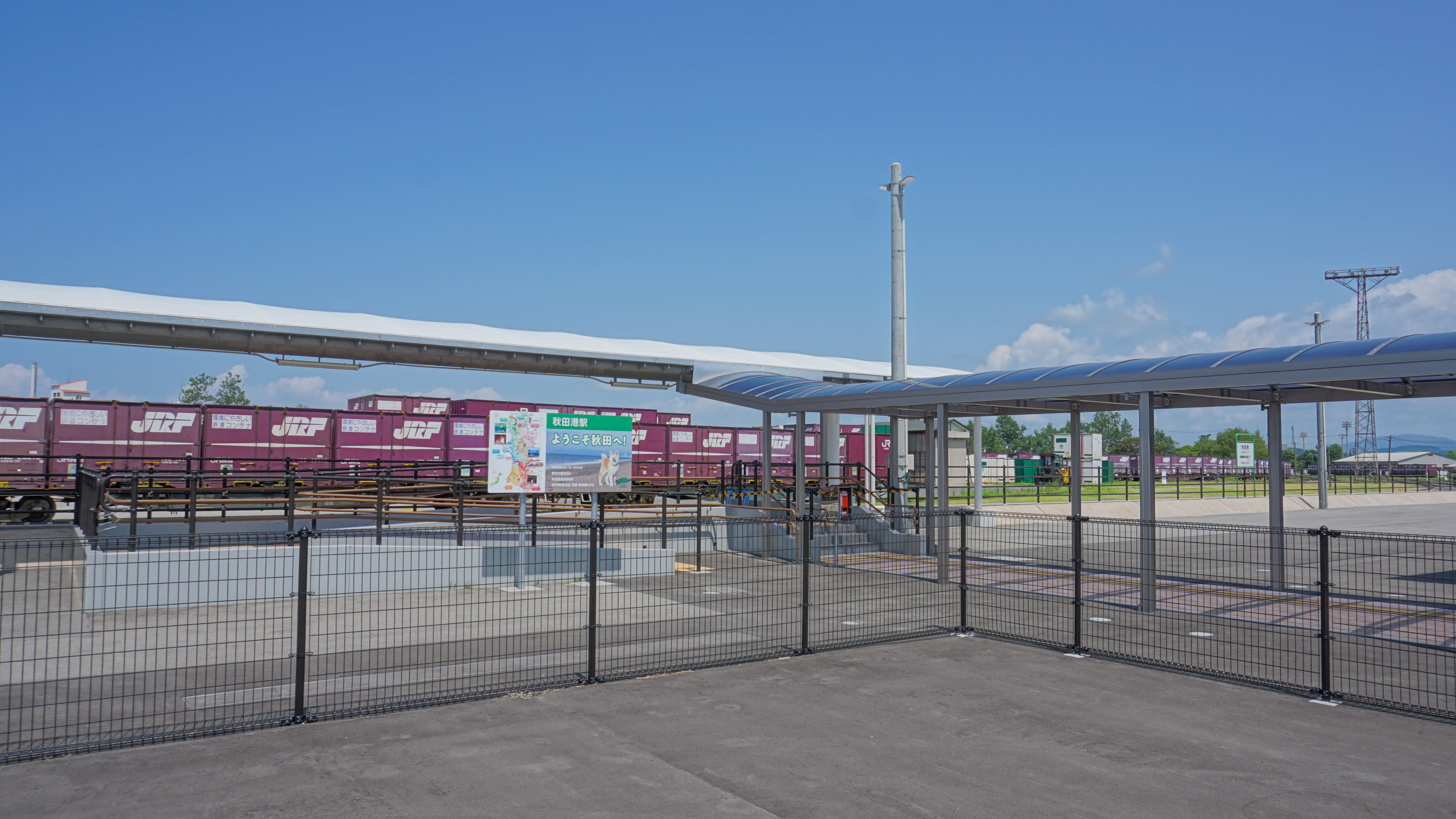
A platform with an extension of 4 cars, which was constructed in 2018

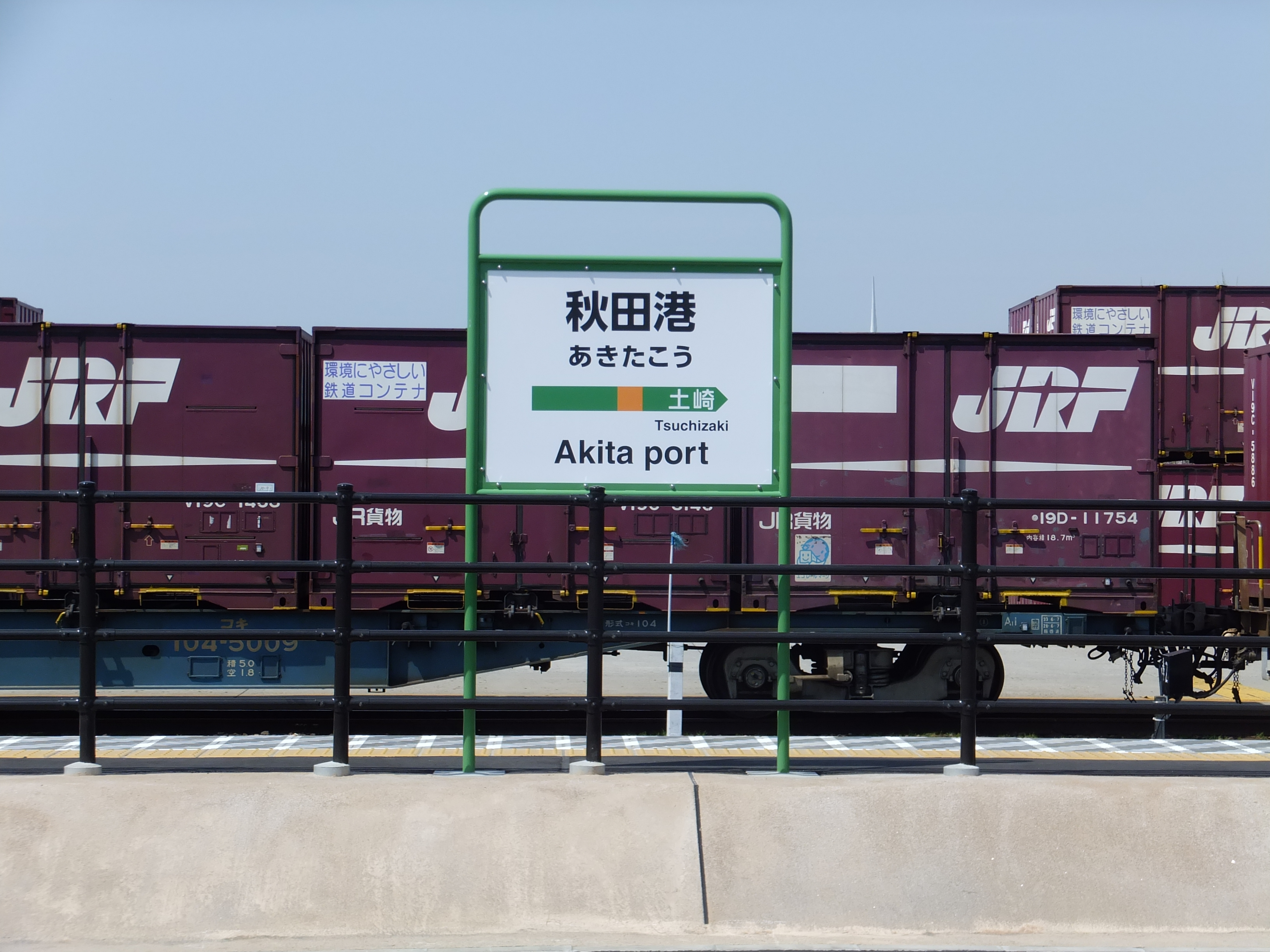
Station name sign

== History ==
Akita Port Station opened on 15 October 1919. The station was absorbed into the JR Freight network upon the privatization of JNR on 1 April 1987.

In March 2021, regular freight services on the freight branch line of the Ōu Main Line were discontinued. On 22 December 2025, it was announced that passenger services on the branch line are scheduled to cease operations by the end of fiscal 2025 before its closure on 1 July 2026.

== Surrounding area ==
- Port of Akita Nakajima Pier
  - Nakajima Pier Ferry Terminal
  - Akita Port Tower Selion (Akita City Port Tower)
- Akita City Northern Citizen Service Center
- Tsuchizaki Minato History Tradition Hall
- Akita Rinko Police Station
- Akita Maritime Japan Coast Guard

== See also ==
- List of railway stations in Japan
