= Fujisaki Line =

Railway line in Kumamoto Prefecture, Japan

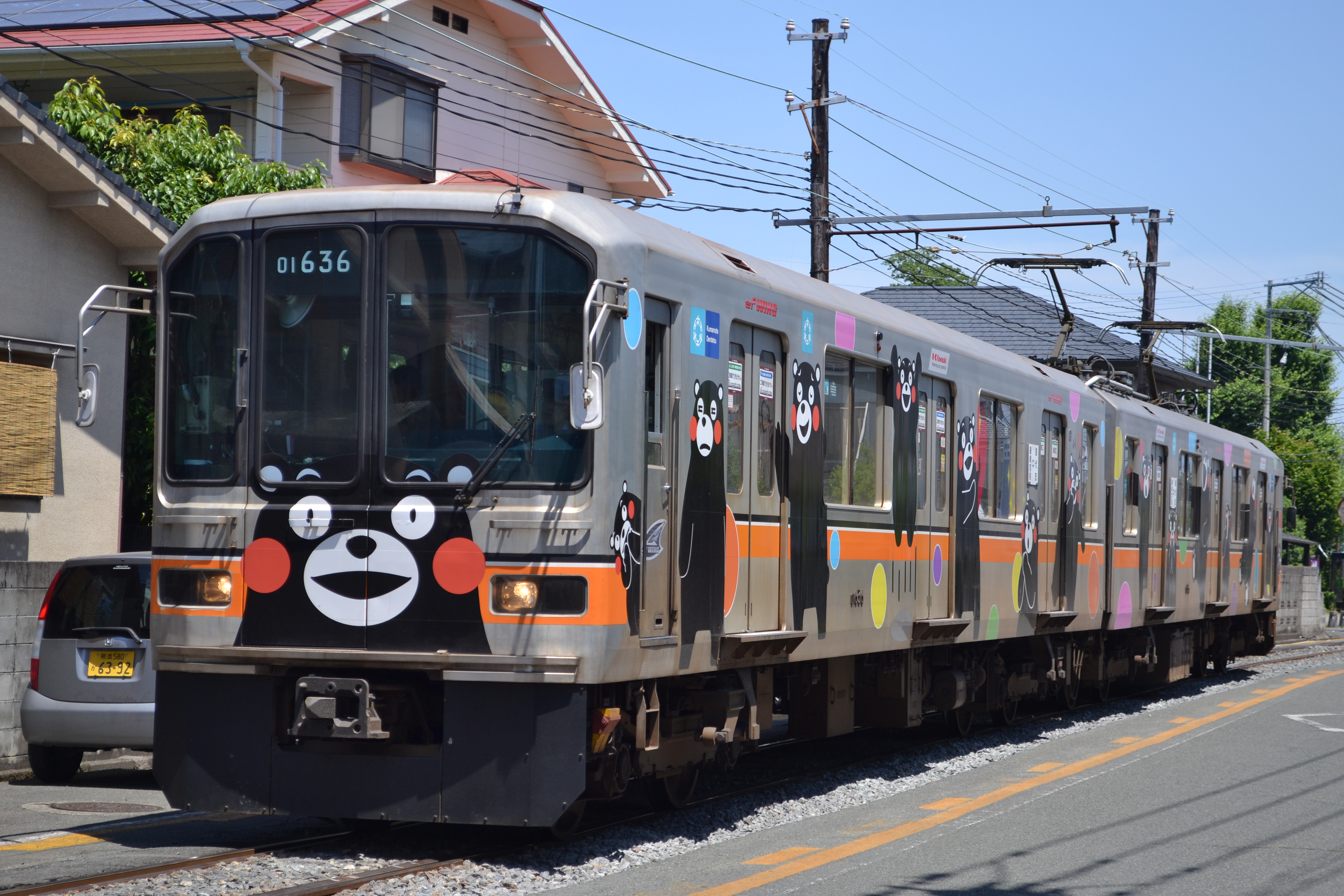
- A passenger train between Fujisakigu-mae and Kurokamimachi stations.

Overview
- Native name: 藤崎線
- Owner: Kumamoto Electric Railway
- Locale: Kumamoto Prefecture
- Termini: Kita-Kumamoto; Fujisakigū-mae
- Stations: 3
- Website: www.kumamotodentetsu.co.jp

Service
- Type: Heavy rail

History
- Opened: 27 March 1913

Technical
- Line length: 2.3 km (1.4 mi)
- Track gauge: 1,067 mm (3 ft 6 in)
- Electrification: Overhead line, DC 600 V

The Fujisaki Line (藤崎線, Fujisaki-sen) is a 2.3 km railway line owned by the Kumamoto Electric Railway, serving Kumamoto City, Kumamoto Prefecture, Japan. The line branches southward from Kita-Kumamoto Station to Fujisakigū-mae Station.

Previously, this line extended to Kami-Kumamoto Station on one side and Kikuchi on the other. The section between Kita-Kumamoto and Kikuchi was transferred to the Kikuchi Line on October 1, 1950, and the section between Fujisakigū-mae and Kami-Kumamoto was transferred to the Kumamoto City Tram as the Tsuboi Line on June 1, 1954. The Tsuboi Line ceased operations in 1970.

== Operations ==
The line is electrified with overhead lines and is single-tracked for the entire line. Passing loops are located at Kita-Kumamoto Station for trains continuing on the Kikuchi Line.

All passenger services on the line continue past Kita-Kumamoto Station to Miyoshi Station on the Kikuchi Line. Trains arrive roughly every thirty minutes.

== Stations ==
No.	Name		Distance (km)	Connections	Location	
KD08	Kita-Kumamoto	北熊本	0.0	Kumaden: Kikuchi Line	Kumamoto	Kita-ku
KD07	Kurokamimachi	黒髪町	1.2		Kumamoto	Chūō-ku
KD06	Fujisakigū-mae	藤崎宮前	2.3		Kumamoto	Chūō-ku
