= Midori-sō incident =

1981 rape and murder case in Japan

- Midori-sō incident (Oita Prefecture) Midori-sō incident (Japan)
- Date: 27–27 June 1981
- Time: Between 23:40 and 0:30 (Japan Standard Time (UTC+9))
- Location: Rokubo-cho, Oita, Oita Prefecture
- Theme: Assault, battery, and rape.
- Cause: Unknown, evidence suggests escalating tensions between two neighbours.
- Perpetrators: Unknown (the statute of limitations expired without any arrests), Mr. A.
- Outcome: Establishment of the Duty solicitor
- Deaths: Death of 1 person (18-year-old female junior college student at the time).
- Arrests: One person was falsely accused due to a mistaken arrest.
- Accused: The man in the next room was indicted but found not guilty.

Japanese name
- Kanji: みどり荘事件
- Kana: みどりそうじけん
Transcriptions
- Romanization: Midori-sō Jiken

The Midori-sō incident (Japanese: みどり荘事件, Hepburn: Midori-sō Jiken; lit. "Green village incident") was a rape and murder case that occurred in June 1981 in Oita, Ōita Prefecture. It is also called the Oita Female Junior College Student Murder Case.

The man in the adjacent room to the victim was arrested and indicted, and was sentenced to life imprisonment at first trial, but was found not guilty on appeal and the verdict was upheld.The appeal's court's verdict suggested the existence of a real culprit other than the defendant, but the statute of limitations expired on 28 June 1996, and the case remained unsolved.

This case is known as the first in Japan in which DNA testing was used by a court of law, and the case that led to the establishment of the duty solicitor.

== Overview ==
In the early hours of 27–28 June 1981, a female junior college student (then 18 years old) was murdered in an apartment building called Midori-so in Oita City, Oita Prefecture. Saliva of blood type A was found with blood type B. Since the victim's blood type was A, this other blood was presumed to be that of the perpetrator.

On 14 January 1982, approximately six months after the incident, Ryoichi Kutsukake, (then 25 years old), who lived in the next room and had type B blood, was arrested as a suspect. During the investigation and early in the trial, Kutsukake confessed to being in the victim's room, but changed his statement midway through the trial and claimed his innocence. However, in the first trial in March 1989, based on his confession and hair analysis by the National Research Institute of Police Science (NAPS), he was found guilty and sentenced to life imprisonment.

During the appeal's trial, numerous criticisms and inconsistencies were pointed out regarding the results of the hair analysis by the National Research Institute of Police Science and DNA analysis adopted by the Fukuoka High Court on its own initiative, which showed that body hair collected at the crime scene matched that of Kutsukake, and in August 1994, the defendant was granted bail, which is unusual for a murder case in Japan. On 30 June 1995, he was found not guilty, and on 13 July, the Fukuoka High Public Prosecutors Office gave up on appeal, and the verdict was finalized on 14 July.

Although there was approximately one year between the acquittal and the expiration of the statute of limitations for murder (which was 15 years at the time), the Oita Prefectural Police, the investigative agency, did not conduct a reinvestigation, and the statute of limitations expired on 28 June 1996.

== Incident ==
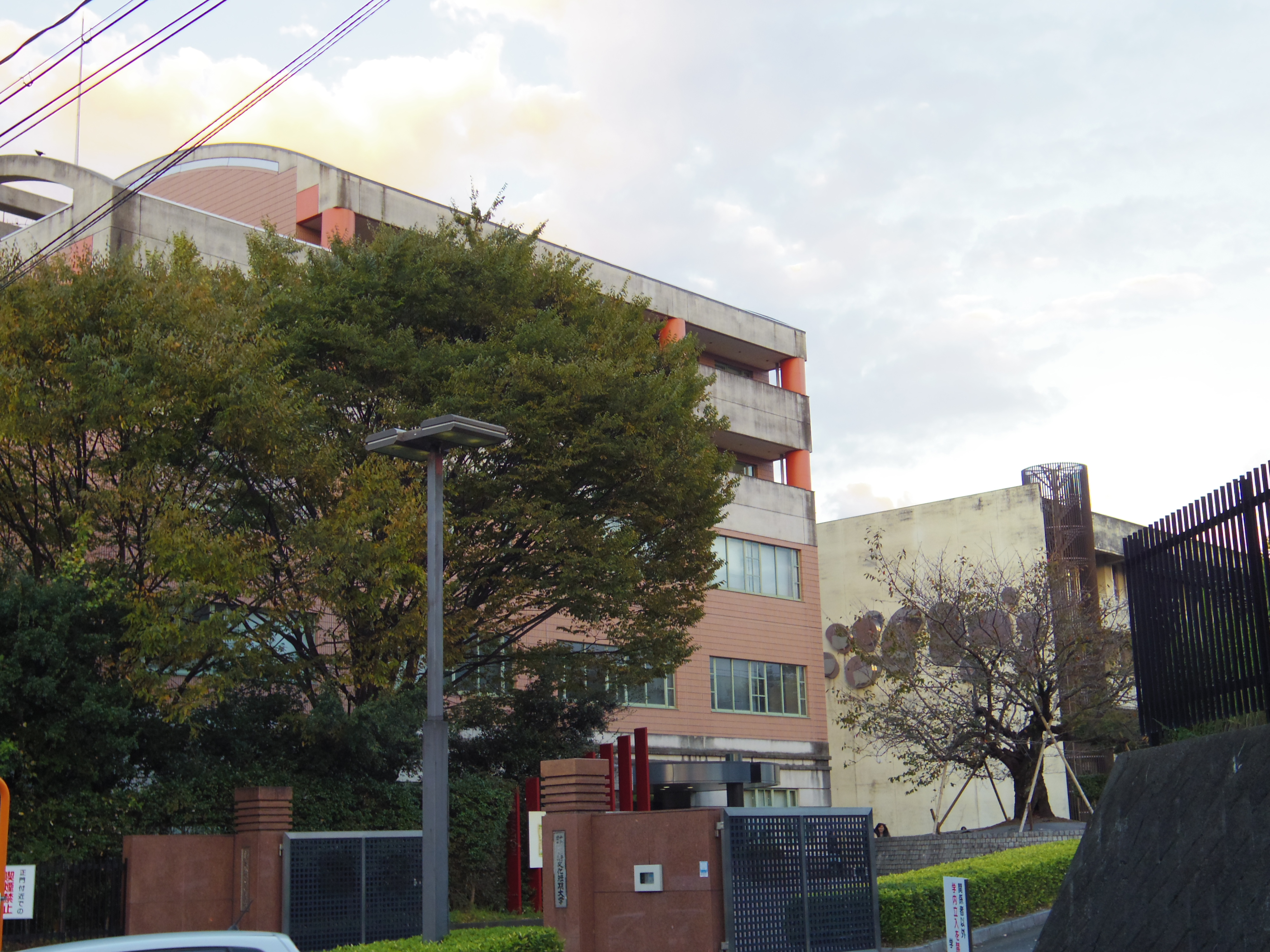
Oita Prefectural College of Arts and Culture Photographed in 2012.

The scene of the crime was a two-story apartment building called "Midori-so" in Rokubo-cho (now Rokubo-minami-cho), Oita City, Oita Prefecture.Located just north of Oita Prefectural College of Arts (now Oita Prefectural College of Arts and Culture), it was home to many young women, including students from college. The victim was a female first-year student at the same junior college who lived in room 203 with her older sister, a second-year student at the same college.

On 27 June 1981 the sisters went to a concert together with students from their college's music club and students from another University, additionally they attended the after party together. After the first party ended around 10:30 p.m., the sister headed to the second party, but the victim declined, saying that she "wanted to take a bath".

The incident is believed to have occurred shortly after the victim returned home. Around midnight, residents of Midori-so and the surrounding area heard a woman screaming, "Someone help me!", followed by the sounds of things falling and someone chasing someone else. After a moment, a normal conversational voice could be heard saying things like "tell me" and "why," followed by the thumping noises again.

When the after party ended, the older sister returned home around 12:30 am on 28 June. She tried to open the door but it was locked. When she managed to open the apartment she found her sister lying on the kitchen floor. The victim was found naked apart from the T-shirt she was wearing, her overalls wrapped around her neck. The sister realized she was probably dead, and went to look for help, she visited another male student living in a nearby apartment and the police were called at 12:51 am.

== Investigation ==
=== Initial investigation ===
At around 1:00 a.m. on 28 June, a police officer arrived at the scene. After confirming the body, the officer knocked on the doors of the neighbors on either side of the house to talk to them, but the lights were out in room 205, and although the lights were on in room 202, no one came out. Later, while searching the vacant lot in front of Midori-so, a man called out to them from the window of Room 202, "What are you doing?". The officer went to room 202 and told the man that a murder had occurred in room 203. He asked the man if he had heard anything, but the man replied, "I had been drinking and was asleep and didn't hear anything".

An investigation into the crime scene at Room 203 revealed signs of a struggle between the perpetrator and the victim, but no evidence of a search for money or valuables.There were also no footprints in the room. Semen was collected from the vagina and pubic hair of the deceased, and the semen found on the pubic hair was determined to be that of a person with blood type B. In the tatami room, underwear with menstrual blood, and a milky white liquid with a light pink tint were found, which turned out to be the saliva of a person with blood type A containing type B blood. The victim's blood type was Type A, and it was speculated that the victim had bitten the assailant. Additionally, human hair and numerous fingerprints of people other than the sisters were found in the room. An autopsy determined the cause of death was asphyxiation, caused by manual pressure on the victim's neck and then strangulation with the victim's overalls.

As dawn broke, the area of questioning was expanded and testimony was obtained from nearby residents. A resident of room 201 said, "I went to bed around 10 p.m., but I couldn't fall asleep because of the loud stereo sound coming from room 202 next door. After a while, it got quieter so I fell asleep, but I was woken up by a banging sound coming from somewhere in the apartment, and then I heard the sound of someone falling. In the meantime, I heard a woman's voice, and although it was a quite voice, I heard her say, 'Why, why?'". A resident living on the east side of Midori-so across the vacant lot said, "A little while after I went to bed around 11pm, I heard a woman's voice asking, 'Why?' and 'Tell me.' Afterwards, two or three banging sounds were heard coming from the second floor of Midori-so".

In addition, more detailed testimony was obtained from the resident of room 205, which was located to the north of room 203, where the crime occurred. According to her, "I fell asleep with the lights on in my room at around 11:40 p.m. that day, and I don't know how long it had been, but I was woken up by a woman screaming, 'Ahhh!' and 'Someone help me!' I also heard the sound of something falling. Thinking that a molester had entered one of the rooms, she left the room in her pajamas to check on the person next door, Room 203, and when she knocked, she heard a woman scream from inside. Scared, she hurried back to her room, covered her head with a blanket and got into bed. I also heard him say "uuuh" which made me a bit worried, but then I heard him talking normally again, so I thought he was just joking, I went to the bathroom and got back into bed. However, after a while, a thud was heard, along with a voice crying out "God, forgive me!", repeated about 10 times over the course of a minute or two. Then it became quiet again, but after a while I heard a rattling sound coming from the closet. I got scared, so I got changed and ran out of the room to go back to my parents' house. I got in the taxi at around 12:40, and I think I woke up when I first heard the woman scream about 15 or 20 minutes earlier".

Based on this information, it appears that the perpetrator knew the victim well enough to be allowed into her room even when visiting her late at night. On 29 June the Oita Godo newspaper also reported that the crime was likely committed by someone the perpetrator knew, as there were no signs that the perpetrator had entered the house wearing dirty shoes and the door lock had not been broken. However, the suspect who emerged in the investigation was someone completely different from the above description of the perpetrator.

=== Suspect ===
The suspect was Ryoichi Kutsukake, who lived in room 202 next to the crime scene.

Kutsukake was born on 9 May 1956 in Ono-cho, Ono-gun, Oita Prefecture (now part of the city of Hogo Ono). However, when he was in the fourth grade of elementary school, his father developed diabetes and was frequently admitted to and discharged from the hospital, and his life changed dramatically. When he entered junior high school, his mother moved to Oita City to care for his father, and so he began living with his two older sisters. He stopped going to school in the second semester of his second year of junior high, and was diagnosed with autistic psychopathology and began taking medication. Kutsukake began living in room 202 of Midori-so on 20 April 1981 with his girlfriend.

On 26 June 1981, the day before the incident, both Kutsukake and his girlfriend were working the early shift. After finishing work at 3 p.m., the two of them went to a pachinko parlor together, then stopped by a friend's house and a coffee shop before returning home late at night. The following day, 27 June, was a day off for both of them. An argument started when Kutsukake refused his girlfriend's invitation to go shopping for dinner together, and they ended up arguing about the cost of living, which Kutsukake had been unhappy about for a long time, In the end Kutsukake's girlfriend stormed out of the room saying she was going back to her parents. Although they had argued many times before, this was the first time a fight caused either of them to leave.

On the night of the incident, Kutsukake was alone in the apartment. Since even residents of 205 and 201 heard loud noises, It was odd for Kutsukake to say he had not heard anything considering his proximity. Furthermore, a few days after the incident, a resident of Room 102 testified that he heard the sound of running water in the bathtub in Room 201 or 202 after the slamming noise stopped.

=== Arrest ===
In December of the same year, a series of arson incidents occurred in Oita City. Also, a robbery that occurred in October of the same year, in which 5 million yen was robbed from a bank, remained unsolved. Citizens and the mass media were very critical of the police, and the prestige of the police was at stake in solving the Midori-so incident. Then, on 11 December, Kutsukake, along with four of his colleagues, assaulted a cab driver. Kutsukake returned to work on 1 August, The day was bonus pay day at the hotel where Kutsukake worked, and the five were in a drunken state. The police arrested only Kutsukake on the spot for assault. It appeared a blatantly separate arrest, as long as Kutsukake refused to be interviewed voluntarily, it seemed that the police wanted to take him into custody somehow. However, the morning after the incident, Kunio Furuta of Oita Godo Law Office, a lawyer retained by the labor union at Kutsukake's workplace, intervened. He prepared a settlement agreement and a petition, and persuaded Kutsukake, who was reluctant to admit that he wasn't drunk and didn't remember anything, by saying that he would be released if he admitted to the crime, Kutsukake was released within a week with a summary order for a 20,000 yen fine. However, Kutsukake was left with only one complaint: "The lawyers wouldn't listen to me".

On 28 December, the long-awaited report from the National Research Institute of Police Science arrived at the Oita Prefectural Police. A hair analysis showed that three of the body hairs left in the victim's room were identical to Kutsukake's. The police finally obtain physical evidence and moved to arrest Kutsukake. On 14 January 1982 (Showa 57), the Oita Godo newspaper ran a front-page article in its morning edition with the headline, "Oita Police Station confirms that the man in the next room is to be arrested due to matching body hair and blood type" and "Fresh wounds found immediately after the incident".

That morning, while at a driving school, Kutsukake received a phone call from his girlfriend saying, "It's in the paper that a man has been arrested". Kutsukake's manager contacted him and told him to resign and stay at home. Kutsukake rushed home thinking that his mother was worried when she saw the article, but she was not there. At 12:50 on the same day, Kutsukake was at home with a friend from high school who had visited him out of concern, when he was arrested by detective T. As the press and onlookers, who had gathered in response to the newspaper article, looked on, Kutsukake was taken to the Oita Police Station. The evening edition of the Oita Godo Newspaper that day carried the headlines "Hotel employee arrested, persistence ......7 months in the making" and "Mystery criminal Kutsukake," along with a large photo of Kutsukake being taken away.
