= Police psychology =

Police psychology, also referred to as "police and public safety psychology," was formally recognized in 2013 by the American Psychological Association as a specialty in professional psychology. The goal of police psychology is to ensure law enforcement is able to perform their jobs safely, effectively, ethically, and lawfully.

== Police psychologists ==
Police and public safety psychologists have specialty knowledge about the nature of police work. This specialized knowledge consists of police working environments, the goals of the agencies, stressors and trauma that public safety personnel experience, their responses to these stressors, and the interventions used to treat symptoms of PTSD. Additionally, police psychologists are aware of confidentiality and testimonial privilege when serving this community. These psychologists then apply the science and profession of psychology in four primary domains of practice: assessment (primarily preemployment assessments of prospective candidates and fitness-for-duty evaluations of incumbent personnel), clinical intervention, operational support, and organizational consultation. Police and public safety psychology intervention strategies primarily include short-term cognitive behavioral treatments and approaches. Training also includes review of research regarding the relative efficacy as well as the limitations of post-crisis interventions unique to law enforcement personnel (e.g., post-shooting incidents, line-of-duty deaths, deep undercover stress reactions). In addition, various modalities of treatment and programs are typically integrated within the training (e.g. peer support teams, EMDR, suicide intervention training, wellness coaching). Preparation for practice in operational psychology includes review of research in: crisis intervention, hostage negotiation, criminal profiling, psychological autopsy, and epidemiological factors affecting outcomes of various tactical situations.

== Organizations ==
There are several police and law enforcement agencies in the world today that employ police and public safety psychologists and these are:

- The Los Angeles Police Department - At the Behavioral Science Services
- The Federal Bureau of Investigation - At the Behavioral Analysis Unit
- U.S. Air Force Office of Special Investigations - A military investigative agency
- The National Police Improvement Agency (UK) - Behavioural Investigative Advisors (BIA)
- The Hong Kong Police - Hong Kong Police Force - Psychological Services Group
- The Japanese Police - Japanese Nation Policy Agency - National Research Institute of Police Science at the Criminology and Behavioral Sciences Section
- Singapore Police Force - Police Psychological Services Department (PPSD), Police Headquarters.
- Western Australia Police Academy - Occupational Psychology Unit.

== Professional organizations ==
- American Board of Police & Public Safety Psychology
- American Psychological Association, Division 18 (Psychologists in Public Service), Police & Public Safety Section
- Consortium of Police Psychological Services (COPPS)
- International Association of Chiefs of Police (IACP), Police Psychological Services Section.
- Society for Police and Criminal Psychology

== Investigative psychology ==
Investigative psychology has gained its own following. This field was started in 1990 by Professor David Canter whilst at the University of Surrey, in the South of England (Canter and Youngs, (2009). It brings together issues relating to investigative information, the drawing of inferences and the ways in which law enforcement decision-making can be supported through scientific research. Investigative psychology grew directly out of empirical research. This field covers the full range of investigation related activities such as:

- detection of deception,
- investigative interviewing,
- statement analyses,
- behavioral analyses of crimes.

This sphere has been much abused worldwide with the spread of the use of originally Eastern methods, including gradual copying of the type of methods once associated to some areas of Asia, what characterizes the latter is the contacting of the suspect via mental means, "thinking to" techniques known already in Eastern Europe followed by repetition of the alleged offence continually mentally to make it start repeating itself in the mind and even begin to affect speech. Thus these types of investigations and any based on them, being most legally conducted in their areas of origin, are highly dubious.

== Universities ==
- Bond University (Australia)
- Griffith University (Australia). Masters of Science in Forensic Psychology.
- University of South Australia (Australia). Master of Forensic Psychology.
- Hong Kong University (while it doesn't specialise in police psychology, its faculty includes police psychologists.
- University of Indonesia (Professor Sarlitos Wirawan Sarwono)
- Nanyang Technological University (Singapore) (not a course itself — but a module). The Forensic Psychology of Crime, Terrorism and Disasters
- National University of Singapore. Correctional Psychology (Singapore)
- Leicester University (UK). Masters of Science in Forensic Psychology.
- University of Liverpool (UK). Masters in Investigative and Forensic Psychology.
- Portsmouth University (UK). Masters of Science in Forensic Psychology.

== Police Psychology Blogs ==
- Dr. Gary S. Aumiller's Inside Police Psychology
- Dr. Laurence Miller
