= Maki Station =

Maki Station is the name of three train stations in Japan:

- Maki Station (Niigata) (巻駅)
- Maki Station (Kyoto) (牧駅)
- Maki Station (Oita) (牧駅)
