= Vincent B. Van Hasselt =

- Born: 1953 (71 Years Old)
- Occupation: Professor of Psychology, President's Distinguished Professor, Director of the First Responder Research and Training Program at Nova Southeastern University
- Education: San Diego State University (B.A) University of Pittsburgh (M.S & Ph.D)

Vincent B. Van Hasselt (born 1953) is a Professor in Psychology and the Director of the First Responder Research and Training Program at Nova Southeastern University. His area of focus is First Responder Psychology that looks into policing issues, 911 operators, firefighters and crime investigators.

Van Hasselt has worked for the Federal Bureau of Investigation (FBI), and has served roles in police department's such as, officer, director and training coordinator. Van Hasselt alongside being a professor is currently working on research for a National Survey of Mental Health in First Responders.

== Education ==
Dr. Van Hasselt obtained a B.A. in Psychology at San Diego State University (1976). Van Hasselt then obtained an M.S. in Clinical psychology at the University of Pittsburgh (1979). He then continued his studies and receive a Ph.D. in Clinical Psychology also at the University of Pittsburgh (1983).

In 1983, Van Hasselt also worked for the University of Pittsburgh School of Medicine in an internship for their Department of Psychiatry while in school obtaining his Ph.D.

== Career ==
From 1992-1997, Dr. Van Hasselt started his early career in the Criminal Investigation Division in the City of Miami Beach Florida where he served as a Consultant. In 1995, he started as a Law Enforcement Officer for the Plantation Florida Police Department. His lecturing history includes:

- 1996-2002: Instructor for Criminal Justice Institute for Broward County Police Academy
- 1998-2012: Lecturer and Consultant for the Behavioral Science Unit at the FBI Academy
- 2000-2007: Lecturer and Consultant for the Crisis Negotiation Unit at the FBI Academy
- 1998-Present: Training Coordinator for the Crisis response team for the Plantation Florida Police Department
- 2002-Present: Clinical Director for the Critical Incident Stress Management (CSIM) Team for the Plantation Florida Police Department
- 2002-Present: Instructor for the Police crisis intervention team in Broward County, Florida

In 2005, Dr. Van Hasselt was hired as a Team Psychologist for the FBI's Hostage Negotiation Team and also the FBI's National Crisis Prevention and Intervention Program. He works out of the Miami Field Office for the FBI. His focus is working with FBI personnel and managing crisis prevention and intervention. Dr. Van Hasselt is also a co-creator of the Global Hostage-Taking Research and Development for the Bureau which studies the motivations of hostage takers globally.

Dr. Van Hasselt remains as a part-time police officer for the Plantation Florida Police Department, specifically he is a member of the Field Force Unit. He is a Training Coordinator and Team member of the Department's Crisis Response Team in which he had co-founded. Heis also an Instructor for the Crisis Intervention Team in the Broward County Police Department. In this team, he works with officers to learn the necessary steps to intervene with the mentally ill and the precautions to take.

Van Hasselt has worked at Nova Southeastern University from 1993 to the Present Day. From 1992-1993, he served as an Associate Professor in the College of Psychology before becoming a full-time professor. In 1993, he served as the Associate Director for Community Clinic for Older Adults. He also served as the Director for the Family Violence Program at Nova for some years.

From 1993-Present, he has served as a Professor for the College of Psychology teaching a range of classes within the university. For a brief stint from 2005-2006, he was the Interim Associate Dean for the College of Psychology. In 2015, he received President's Distinguished from the College of Psychology at NSU to recognize his achievements in his profession.

Dr. Van Hasselt's current position at Nova Southeastern University is a Professor in Psychology and the Director of the First Responder Research and Training Program.

Dr. Van Hasselt licenses include, in 1993-Present he became a Licensed Psychologist in the State of Florida Department of Business and Professional Regulation, in 1995 he became a Certified Law Enforcement Officer for Broward County Florida Police Academy, in 1998 he became a Crisis (Hostage) Negotiator for FBI National Crisis Negotiation Course.

== Research ==
Dr. Van Hasselt's areas of academic focus include; Interpersonal relationship violence, Police psychology, Offender profiling, Apprehension, Interrogation techniques, first responder psychology, juvenile offenders interviewing and behavioral Criminology.

Van Hasselt's research mainly focuses on First Responder Psychology. Van Hasselt is currently working with the Behavioral Analysis Unit of the United States Marshals Service on a National Survey of Mental Health in First Responders and the Long-Term Evaders or LOTES Project. LOTES goal is to look into different strategies used by criminals who have not been caught to try to be able to catch future individuals sooner. His national survey is one of largest invesitgations done within emergency personnel up to date.

He has done research with both Assessment of Stress and Resilience in Emergency Communications Operations and Firefighter Stress and Resilience, Both of these research projects him and his team received a large grant from the Nova Southeastern University Quality of Life Grant.

Van Hasselt and other colleagues were awarded $15,000 from NSU grant. This was granted for the Assessment of Stress and Resilience in Emergency Communications Operators. He served as the Co-principal Investigator in this research.

His knowledge in these topics had led him to publish books and article on his topics and broaden the scope of research and knowledge of these topics.

== Publications ==
Van Hasselt has over 200 publications, his main publications include the mental health of first responders. For 25 years, Van Hasselt has served as the Editor of the Journal of Family Violence. He has also served as an Editor-in-chief for Aggression and Violent Behavior: A Review Journal, and Journal of Child and Adolescent Substance Abuse.

Dr. Van Hasselt has published over 100 journal articles and over 50 textbook and book chapters. Some notable works are listed below.

=== Books ===
- Van Hasselt, V.B., & Bourke, M.L., (2017) Handbook of Behavioral Criminology. New York: Springer.
- Van Hasselt, V.B., & Hersen, M (1999) Handbook of Psychological Approaches with Violent Offenders: Contemporary Strategies and Issues. New York: Kluwer Plenum Press.
- Van Hasselt, V.B., & Hersen, M. (2000) Aggression and Violence: An Introductory Text. Needham Heights, MA: Allyn & Bacon.
- Van Hasselt, V.B., Morrison, R.L., Bellack, A.S., & Henson, M. (1988) Handbook of Family Violence. New York: Plenum Press.

=== Articles ===
- Browning, S.L., Van Hasselt, V.B., Tucker, A.S., & Vecchi, G.M. (2011). Dealing with the Mentally Ill: The Crisis Intervention Team (CIT) in Law Enforcement. British Journal of Forensic Practice, 13, 235-243.https://psycnet.apa.org/doi/10.1108/14636641111189990
- Henderson, S., LeDuc, T.J., Couwels, J., & Van Hasselt, V.B. (2015). Firefighter Suicide: The Need to Examine Cultural Changes. Fire Engineering, 168, 71-73. https://www.fireengineering.com/firefighting/firefighter-suicide-the-need-to-examine-cultural-change/#gref
- Klinoff, V.A., Van Hasselt, V.B., LeDuc, T.J., & Couwels, J. (2018). Assessment of Resilience and Burnout in Correctional Officers. Criminal Justice and Behavior, 45, 1213-1233. https://nsuworks.nova.edu/cgi/viewcontent.cgi?article=1109&context=cps_stuetd
- Van Hasselt, V.B., Baker, M.T., Romano, S.J., Sellers, A.H., Noesner, G.W., & Smith, S. (2005). Development and Validation of a Role Play Test for Assessing Crisis (Hostage) Negotiation Skills. Criminal Justice and Behavior, 32, 345-361. https://psycnet.apa.org/record/2005-04387-005
- Van Hasselt, V.B., Sheehan, D.C., Tucker, A.S., Sellers, A.H., Baker, M.T, & Couwels, J. (2008). The Law Enforcement Officer Stress Survey (LEOSS): Evaluation of Psychometric Properties. Behavior Modification, 32, 133-151. https://pubmed.ncbi.nlm.nih.gov/18096976/

== Awards ==
- In 1981, he received a Honors Convocation Award from University of Pittsburgh.
- In 1995. he received a Recognition for High Academic Achievement as Class President in Broward County Police Academy.
- In 1996, he received an Annual Award for Best Article, Journal of Behavior Therapy and Experimental Psychiatry.
- In 2002, he received a President's Faculty Scholarship Award from NSU
- In 2004, he received both "Professor of the Year" Award from NSU and "Outstanding Presenter" Award from Florida Association of Hostage Negotiators.
- In 2015, he received President's Distinguished from the College of Psychology at NSU to recognize his achievements in his profession. He also honored alongside colleagues from Broward County Sheriff's Office for their work with first responders.
- 2010-2014, he received NSU External Funding Recognition Award.
- In 2018, he received a ASIS International Law Enforcement Award and a Unit Citation Award from Plantation Police Department.
