= Skull Reaper A-ji =

Japanese wrestler, politician and professional mahjong player (born 1968)

- スカルリーパーA-ji
- Born: November 13, 1968 (age 57); Ōita, Japan
- Professional wrestling career
- Billed height: 180 cm (5 ft 11 in)
- Billed weight: 95 kg (209 lb)
- Billed from: Ōita, Japan
- Debut: December 23, 2003

Member of the Ōita City Council
- Incumbent
- Assumed office February 24, 2013

Personal details
- Party: CDP (2020–present)
- Other political affiliations: Independent (2013–2016); LP (2016–2019); Independent (2019–2020)
- Education: Toshima High School

Skull Reaper A-ji (スカルリーパーA-ji, Sukaru Rīpā Eiji; born November 13, 1968) is a Japanese masked wrestler, politician and professional mahjong player. He is a member of the Ōita City Council, representing the Constitutional Democratic Party of Japan. Skull Reaper A-ji's real name is not a matter of public record, as is often the case with masked wrestlers in lucha libre (the style of pro-wrestling that influenced him) where their private lives are kept a secret from the wrestling fans.

== Early life and education ==
After dropping out of the Tokyo Metropolitan Toshima High School, he became the second in command of a bōsōzoku gang in his hometown of Ōita. After retiring from the gang, he worked as a restaurant clerk and then as an employee of a clothing manufacturer before quitting to become a professional wrestler, which had been his childhood dream.

== Professional wrestling career ==
Skull Reaper A-ji made his professional wrestling debut for Oita Attractive Merry World Pro-Wrestling (AMW) on December 24, 2003, in a match against Kendo Busan. On May 31, 2004, he and several AMW wrestlers left the organization to found Pro Wrestling FTO a month later. The inaugural event was held on November 23 at the Ōita Event Hall and saw Basara and Ricky Fuji defeat xXXx and Shoichi Ichimiya in the main event.

On November 15, 2019, he passed the professional test organized by the commissioner in Mexico to obtain a professional license certified by the Mexican State Boxing & Lucha Libre Commission.

== Professional mahjong career ==
On May 25, 2011, he became the world's first masked professional mahjong player. He is part of the Kyushu Headquarters of the Japan Professional Mahjong League (JPML) and is ranked at 1-dan.

== Political career ==
On February 24, 2013, he was a candidate for election to the Ōita City Council (44 seats) and was elected for the first time in 40th place with 2,828 votes. He is the third masked wrestler to serve as a local council member, following The Great Sasuke (member of the Iwate Prefecture Council) and Super Delfin (member of the Izumi City Council). On March 6, the City Council discussed his request to wear his mask in the assembly hall and decided not to allow him to wear it during plenary sessions and committee meetings. It was determined that this would violate the council's meeting rules, which prohibit the wearing of hats and coats except for reasons such as illness. The use of his ring name written as スカルリーパー・エイジ was approved. On March 11, he attempted to attend a plenary session of the City Council and a meeting of the Standing Committee on General Affairs wearing his mask, but was denied entry. On March 18, the question of whether or not to allow masked people to enter the City Council chambers was put to a vote at a plenary session of the City Council and was rejected by a majority vote. The next day, he attended the plenary session unmasked, wearing glasses and with his face uncovered.

On December 10, 2016, he was appointed as the chairman of the Ōita Prefectural Federation of the Liberal Party.

On February 19, 2017, he was elected to a second term in the Ōita City Council election due to the expiration of his term, coming in 44th place out of a fixed number of 44 (the difference between the runner-up and the losing candidate was only 57 votes).

On February 17, 2019, the Ōita Animal Protection Center opened after the construction of an animal welfare facility that he had requested from the Oita City Council to prevent the killing of pets, which he had long advocated. On April 26, following the Liberal Party's merger with the Democratic Party For the People, he resigned as chairman of the Liberal Party's Ōita Prefectural Federation and became an independent.

In 2020, he joined the Constitutional Democratic Party of Japan.

On February 22, 2021, he was elected to a third term in the Ōita City Council. On April 23, he announced his intention to file a lawsuit against the City Council, claiming that restrictions on his council activities while wearing a mask and not being allowed to publish his work in the council's public relations magazine were unfair discrimination. On June 30, he filed a lawsuit at the Ōita District Court seeking 5 million yen in damages because the City Council had always refused to publish his masked face photo on their website and official bulletin.

== Championships and accomplishments ==
- Fighting Ultimate Crazy Kings

- FUCK! World Dangerous Quality No Limit Championship (1 time)

- Pro Wrestling FTO

- D.o.A Heaven Deathmatch Championship (1 time)
- FTO Local Indie Openweight Championship (3 times)
- FTO Local Indie Tag Team Championship (1 time) – with Kenji Fukimoto
- Kyushu Openweight Championship (2 times)
- Kyushu Tag Team Championship (2 times) – with Azul Dragon
- WOW World Heavyweight Championship (1 time)

- Wrestle Strong Dojo

- WSD Heavyweight Championship (1 time)
- WSD Tag Team Championship (2 times) – with The Great Mitsu and Kaze
