= Oita Hovercraft =

Japanese hovercraft route

Oita Hovercraft 大分空港海上アクセス
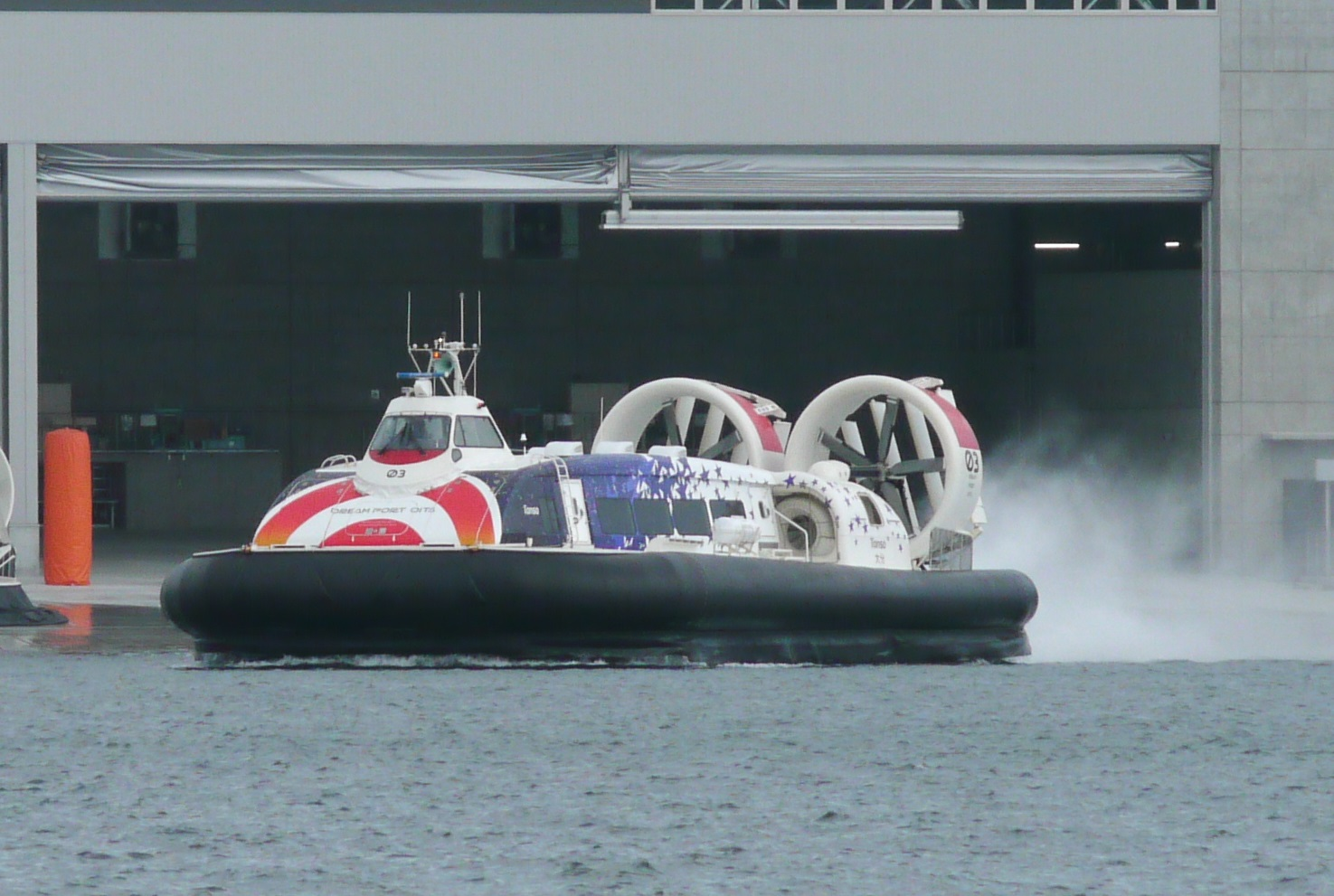
- Locale: Oita, Japan
- Fleet: Hovercraft
- Owner: Oita prefecture
- Operator: Oita Daiichi Hoverdrive
- Began operation: July 2025

Oita Hovercraft is a hovercraft service operating a 33-kilometre route between the centre of Oita City and Oita Airport in Kyushu, Japan. The route is one of the two regular hovercraft services in the world, the other being the service operated by Hovertravel between Ryde on the Isle of Wight and Southsea, Portsmouth in England.

== Overview ==
The route was served by the Oita Hover Ferry company from 1971 to 2009, operating hovercraft on the airport route as well as other tourist routes. When it ceased operations in 2009, the company's fleet consisted of four hovercraft built by Mitsui E&S.

Financial difficulties were the primary reason the hovercraft service was withdrawn. However, the replacement bus route took over an hour to reach the city centre from the airport, whereas the hovercraft made the trip in just 25 minutes. This prompted Oita Governor Katsusada Hirose to decide on resuming the hovercraft service in 2020.

After a series of accidents during training caused a delay of more than a year from the originally scheduled start of operations, regular service of the new hovercraft began in July 2025.

As Mitsui E&S, the only Japanese builder of commercial hovercraft, had already stopped building them, the British hovercraft company Griffon Hoverwork Ltd, the only builder of such ships in the world, was commissioned to build a fleet of three ships. These three ships cost the prefecture approximately 4 billion yen in total (approximately £26 million using the exchange rate when the order was placed). The ships were based on those operated on the Isle of Wight routes, while being approximately two metres longer. The three ships were named Baien, Banri, and Tanso, each after a renowned scholar from Oita during the Edo period.

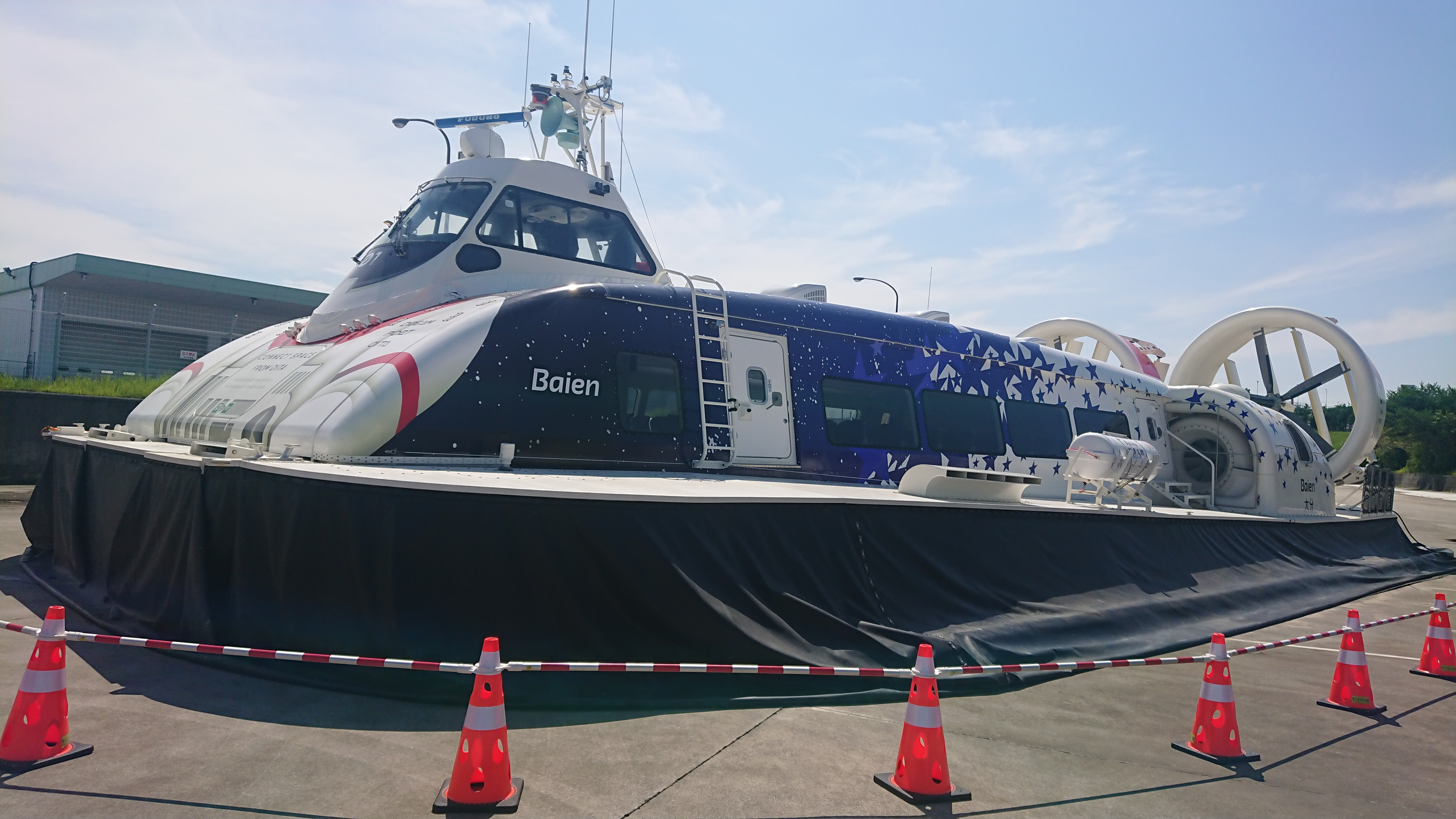
Baien at the Port of Oita, 2023

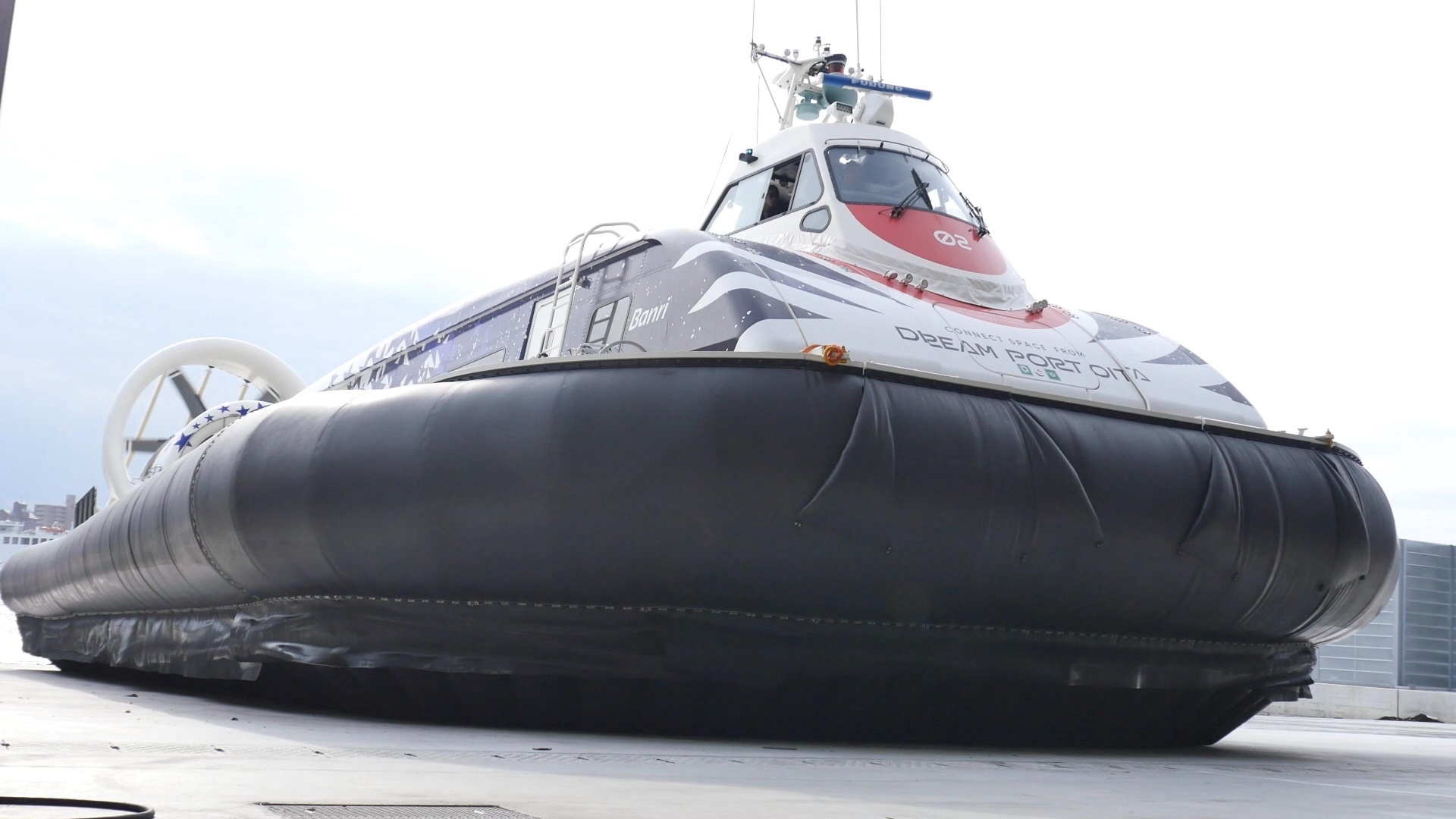
Banri at the Oita Hover Depot, 2023

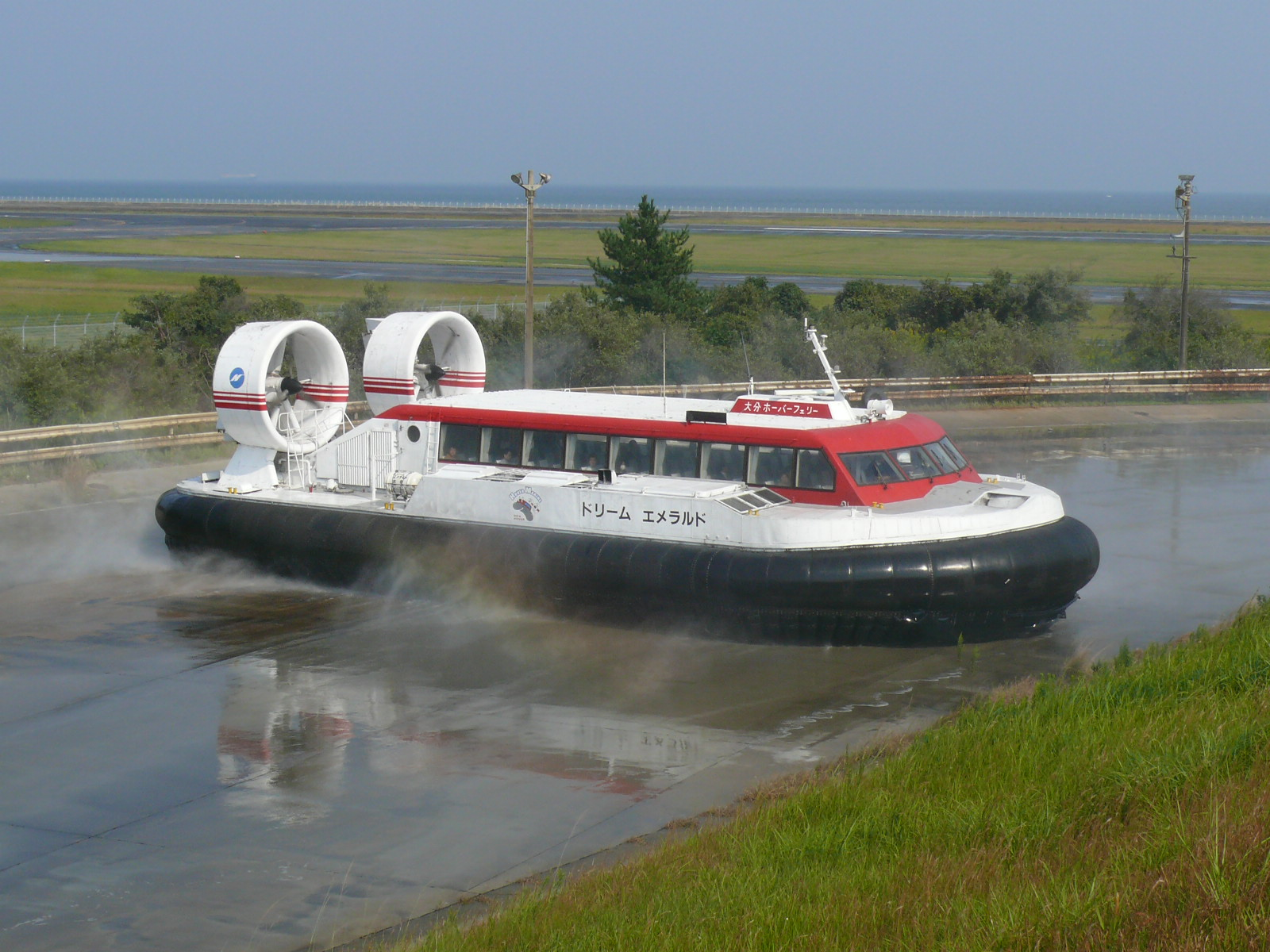
Oita Hover Ferry hovercraft in 2009

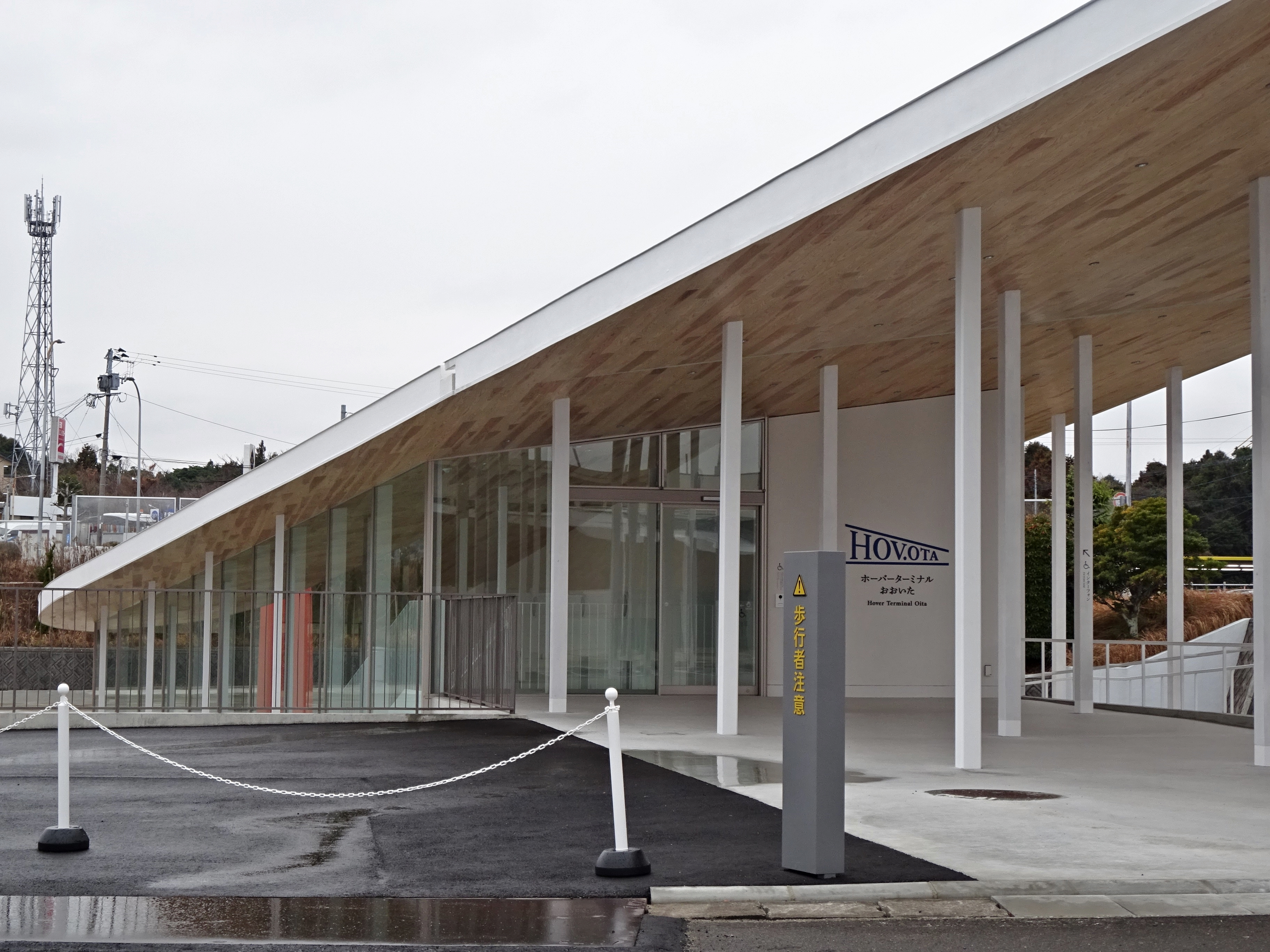
Oita Airport Hover Terminal, 2023
