= Oita University of Nursing and Health Sciences =

Coordinates: 33°10′32″N 131°32′34″E

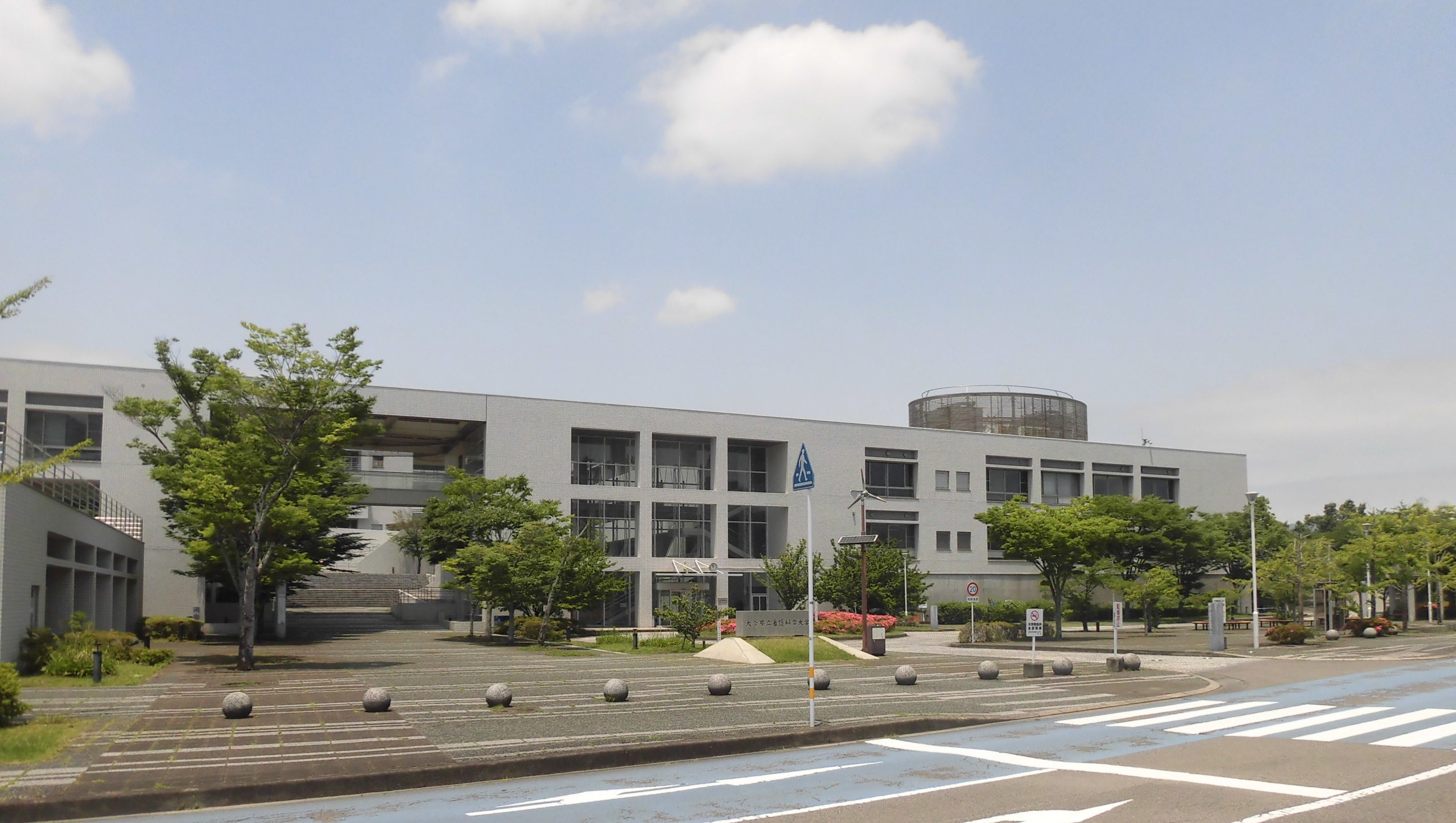
Oita University of Nursing and Health Sciences

Oita University of Nursing and Health Sciences (大分県立看護科学大学, Ōita kenritsu kango kagaku daigaku) is a public university in Ōita, Ōita, Japan, established in 1998.
