= Shikido Station =

Railway station in Ōita, Ōita Prefecture, Japan

Shikido Station 敷戸駅
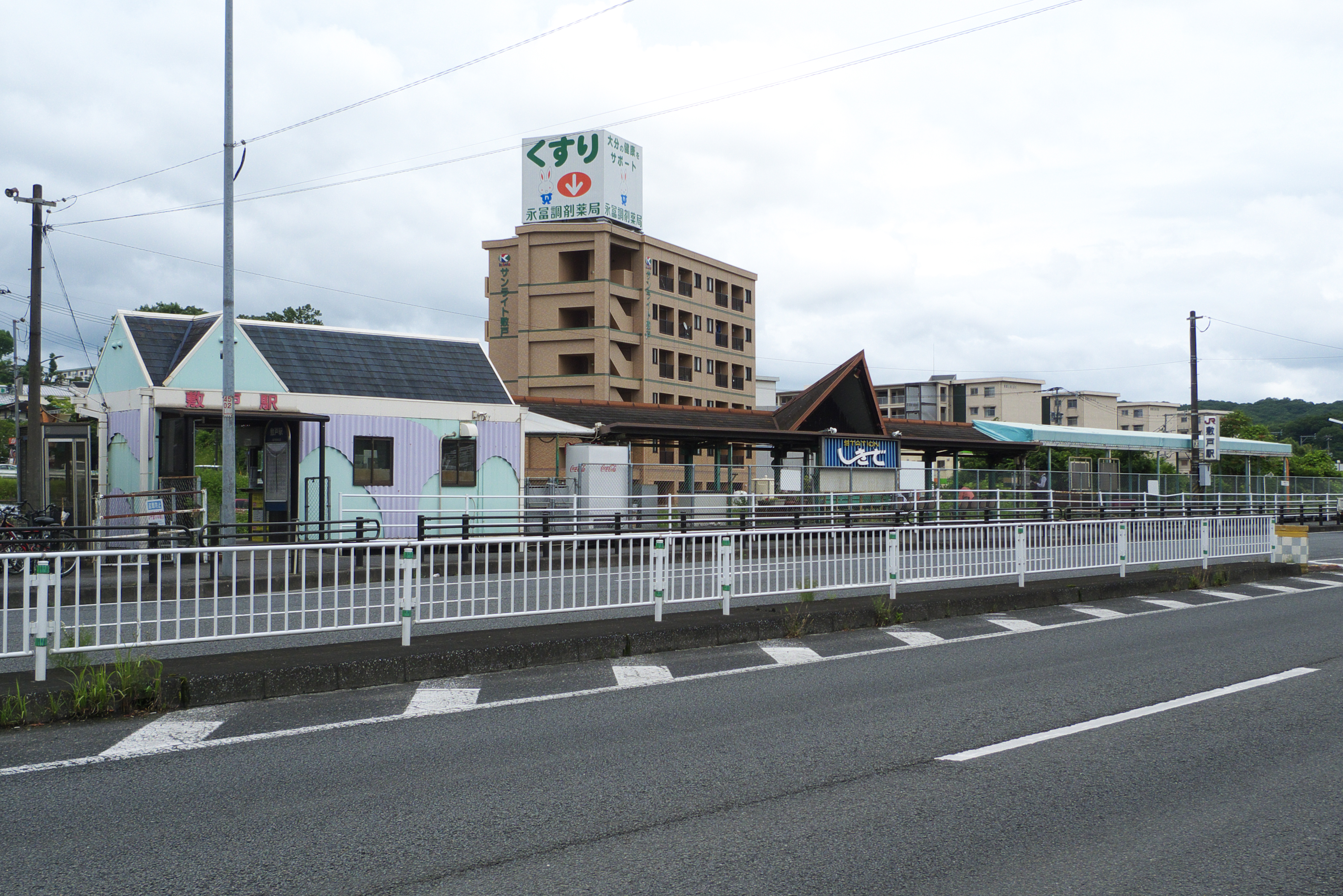
- Shikido Station in 2016

General information
- Location: Oshino, Ōita-shi, Ōita-ken, 870-1121; Japan
- Coordinates: 33°11′17″N 131°36′54″E
- Operator: JR Kyushu
- Line: ■ Hōhi Main Line
- Distance: 140.2 km from Kumamoto
- Platforms: 1 side platform
- Tracks: 1

Construction
- Structure type: At grade

Other information
- Status: Staffed ticket window (outsourced)
- Website: Official website

History
- Opened: 22 February 1987

Passengers
- FY2016: 1,166 daily
- Rank: 146th (among JR Kyushu stations)

Services
| Preceding station | JR Kyushu | Following station |
|---|---|---|
| Ōita-Daigaku-mae towards Kumamoto | Hōhi Main Line | Takio towards Ōita |
Location
- Location within Oita Prefecture Location within Japan

Shikido Station (敷戸駅, Shikido-eki) is a passenger railway station located in Ōita City, Ōita Prefecture, Japan. It is operated by JR Kyushu.

== Lines ==
The station is served by the Hōhi Main Line and is located 140.2 km from the starting point of the line at Kumamoto.

== Layout ==
The station consists of a side platform serving a single track. There is no station building, but a shelter is provided on the platform together with a staffed ticket booth, an automatic ticket vending machine, a SUGOCA card charging station and a SUGOCA card reader.

Management of the station has been outsourced to the JR Kyushu Tetsudou Eigyou Co., a wholly owned subsidiary of JR Kyushu specialising in station services. It staffs the ticket booth which is equipped with a POS machine but does not have a Midori no Madoguchi facility.

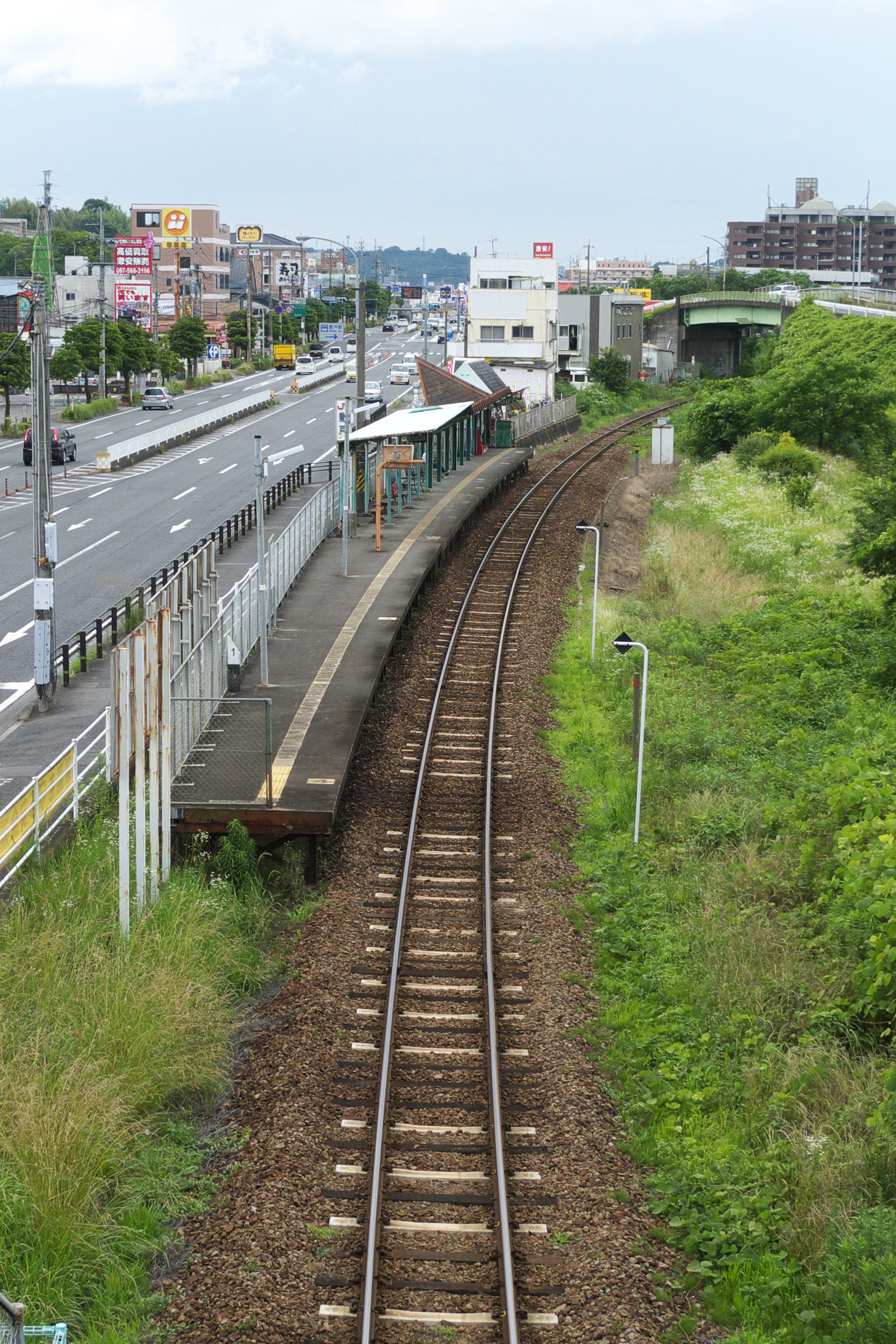
A view of the station platform and track.

== History ==
Japanese National Railways (JNR) opened the station on 22 February 1987 as an additional station on the existing track of the Hōhi Main Line. With the privatization of JNR on 1 April 1987, the station came under the control of JR Kyushu.

In February 2018, JR Kyushu announced that the station would become unstaffed in the autumn of 2018 after completing barrier-free improvements and introducing the "Smart Support" remote station management scheme.

== Passenger statistics ==
In fiscal 2016, the station was used by an average of 1,166 passengers daily (boarding passengers only), and it ranked 146th among the busiest stations of JR Kyushu.

== Surrounding area ==
- Japan National Route 10
- Seiwadai housing complex
- Hagawaradai housing complex
- Shikitodai housing complex
- Miyazakidai housing complex

== See also ==
- List of railway stations in Japan
