= Ōita-Daigaku-mae Station =

Railway station in Ōita, Ōita Prefecture, Japan

Ōitadaigaku-mae Station 大分大学前駅
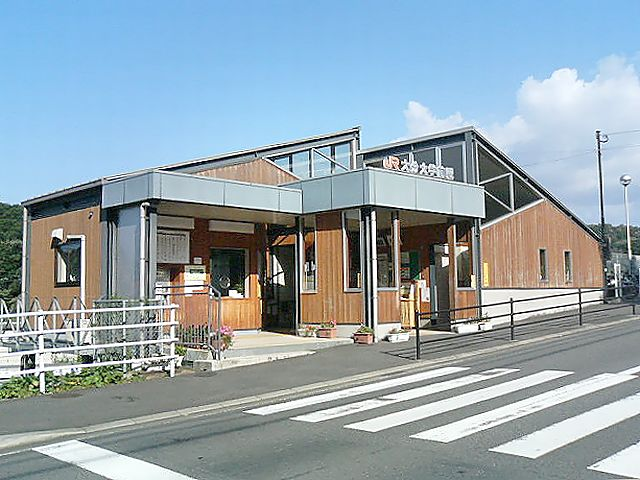
- Ōitadaigaku-mae Station in 2006

General information
- Location: Dannoharu, Ōita-shi, Ōita-ken, 870-1124; Japan
- Coordinates: 33°10′38″N 131°37′08″E
- Operator: JR Kyushu
- Line: ■ Hōhi Main Line
- Distance: 138.8 km from Kumamoto
- Platforms: 1 side platform
- Tracks: 1

Construction
- Structure type: At grade
- Cycle facilities: Designated parking area for bikes
- Accessible: Yes - ramp to platform

Other information
- Status: Staffed ticket window (outsourced)
- Website: Official website

History
- Opened: 23 March 2002

Passengers
- FY2016: 1,604 daily
- Rank: 113th (among JR Kyushu stations)

Services
Preceding station	JR Kyushu	Following station
Naka-Handa towards Kumamoto	Hōhi Main Line	Shikido towards Ōita
Location
- Location within Oita Prefecture Location within Japan

Oitadaigaku-mae Station (大分大学前駅, Ōitadaigaku-mae eki) is a passenger railway station located in Ōita City, Ōita Prefecture, Japan. It is operated by JR Kyushu.

== Lines ==
The station is served by the Hōhi Main Line and is located 138.8 km from the starting point of the line at Kumamoto.

== Layout ==
The station consists of a side platform serving a single track. The station building is a modern wooden structure equipped with a staffed ticket window, an automatic vending machine and a SUGOCA card reader. After the ticket gate, a long sheltered ramp leads down to the platform, which is located at a lower level.

Management of the station has been outsourced to the JR Kyushu Tetsudou Eigyou Co., a wholly owned subsidiary of JR Kyushu specialising in station services. It staffs the ticket booth which is equipped with a POS machine but does not have a Midori no Madoguchi facility.

== History ==
JR Kyushu (JNR) opened the station on 23 March 2002 as an additional station on the existing track of the Hōhi Main Line.

In February 2018, JR Kyushu announced that the station would become unstaffed in the autumn of 2018 after completing barrier-free improvements and introducing the "Smart Support" remote station management scheme.

== Passenger statistics ==
In fiscal 2016, the station was used by an average of 1,604 passengers daily (boarding passengers only), and it ranked 113th among the busiest stations of JR Kyushu.

== Surrounding area ==
- Oita University Dannohara Campus
- Japan Ground Self-Defense Force Camp Oita
- Oita Prefecture Industrial Science and Technology Center

== See also ==
- List of railway stations in Japan
