= Oita Junior College =

Coordinates: 33°14′40″N 131°36′16″E

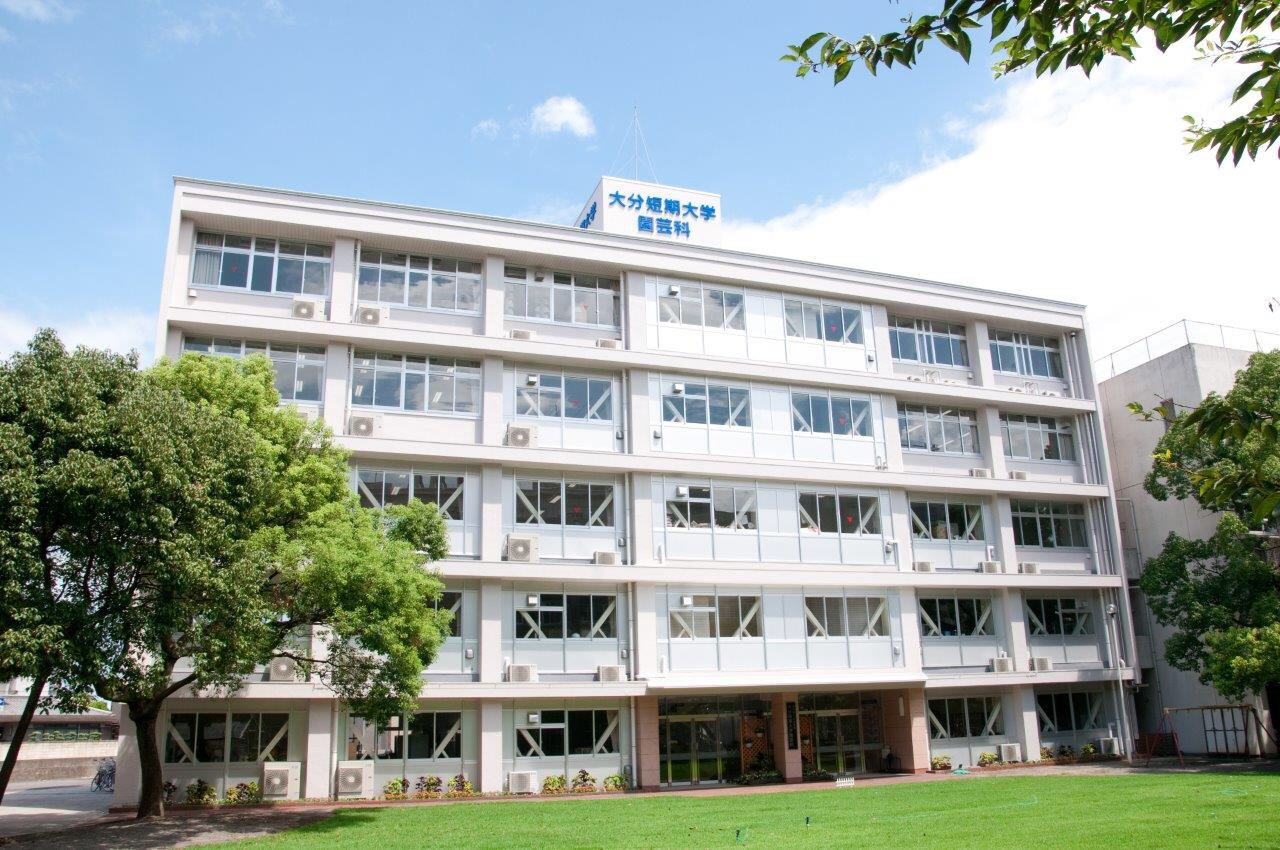

Oita Junior College (大分短期大学, Ōita tanki daigaku) is a private junior college in Ōita, Ōita, Japan, established in 1964.
