= Ōita (city) =

Ōita 大分市
- Prefecture capital and Core city
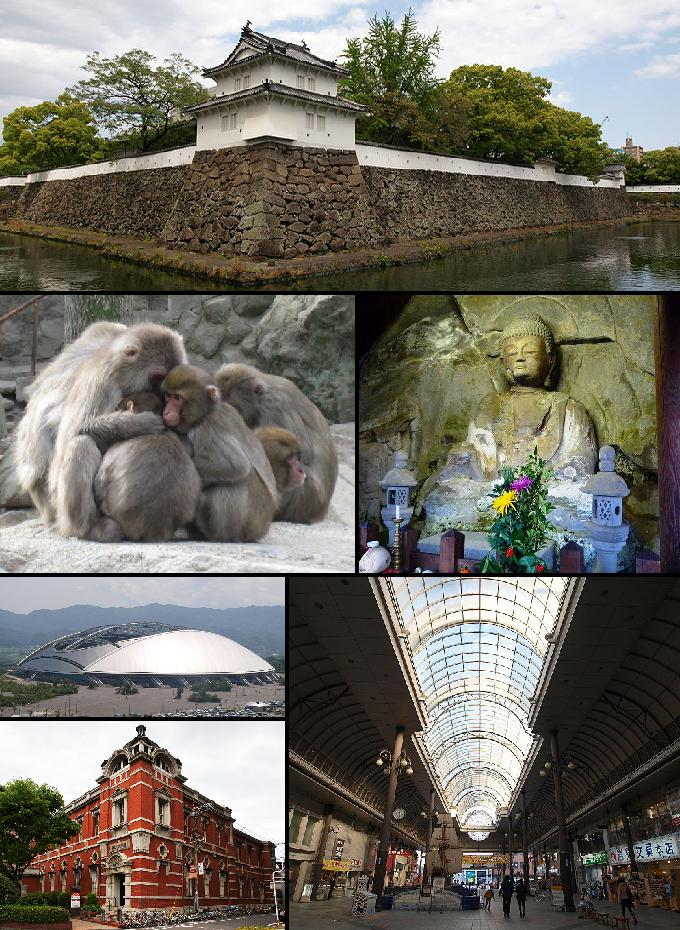
- From top, left to right: Funai Castle, Monkeys in Mount Takasaki, Motomachi Stone Buddhas, Ōita Stadium, Old Ōita Bank, Shopping street in central Ōita

- Flag Seal
- Location of Ōita in Ōita Prefecture

- Location in Japan
- Coordinates: 33°14′0″N 131°36′24″E
- Country: Japan
- Region: Kyushu
- Prefecture: Ōita

Government
  - Mayor: Shinya Adachi (since April 2023)

Area
  - Total: 502.38 km^{2} (193.97 sq mi)

Population (November 30, 2023)
  - Total: 474,804
  - Density: 945.11/km^{2} (2,447.8/sq mi)
- Time zone: UTC+09:00 (JST)
- City hall address: 2–31 Niage-machi, Ōita-shi, Ōita-ken 870-8504
- Website: Official website
- Symbols
- Flower: Camellia sasanqua
- Tree: Elaeocarpus sylvestris

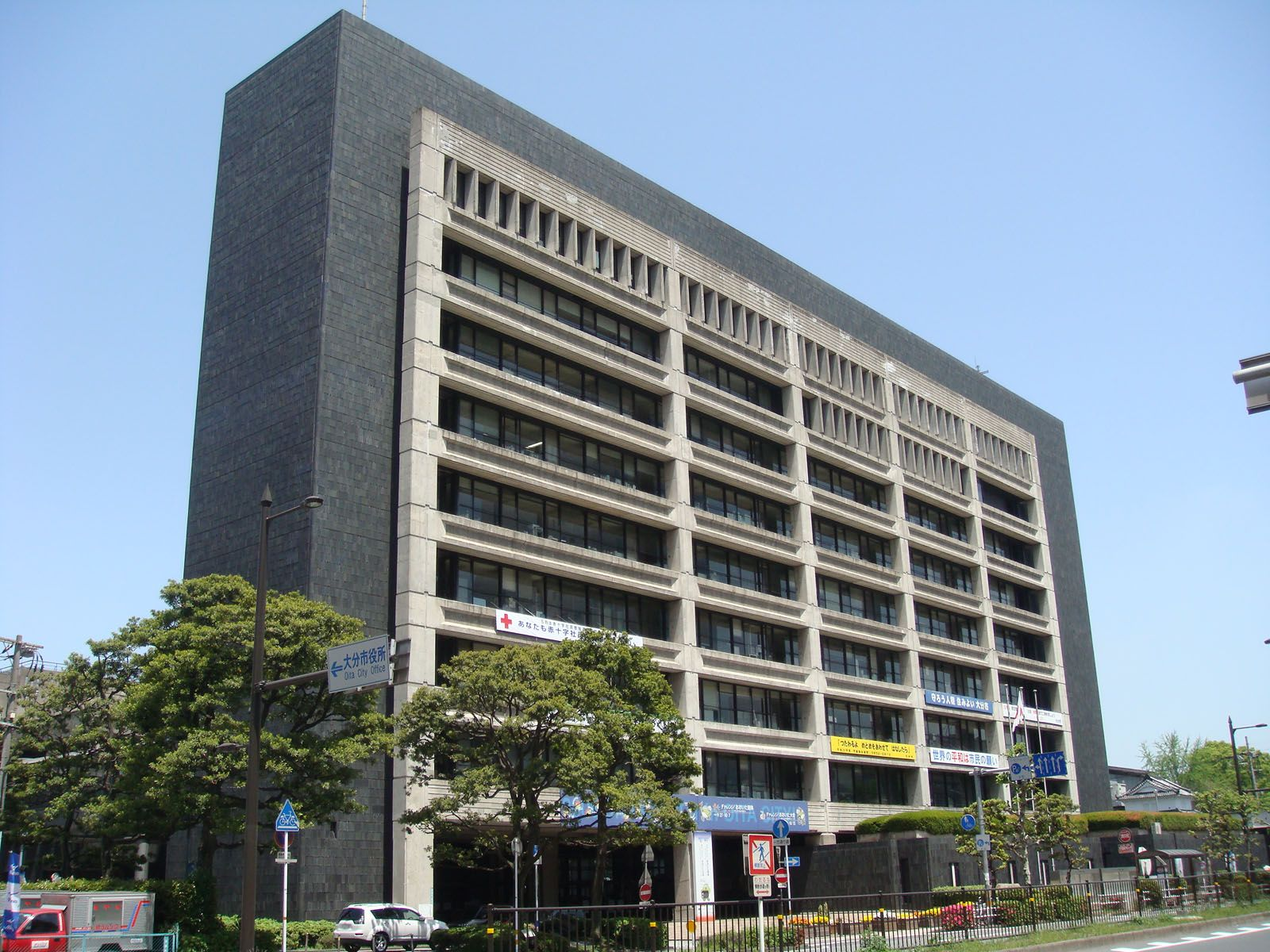
Ōita City Hall

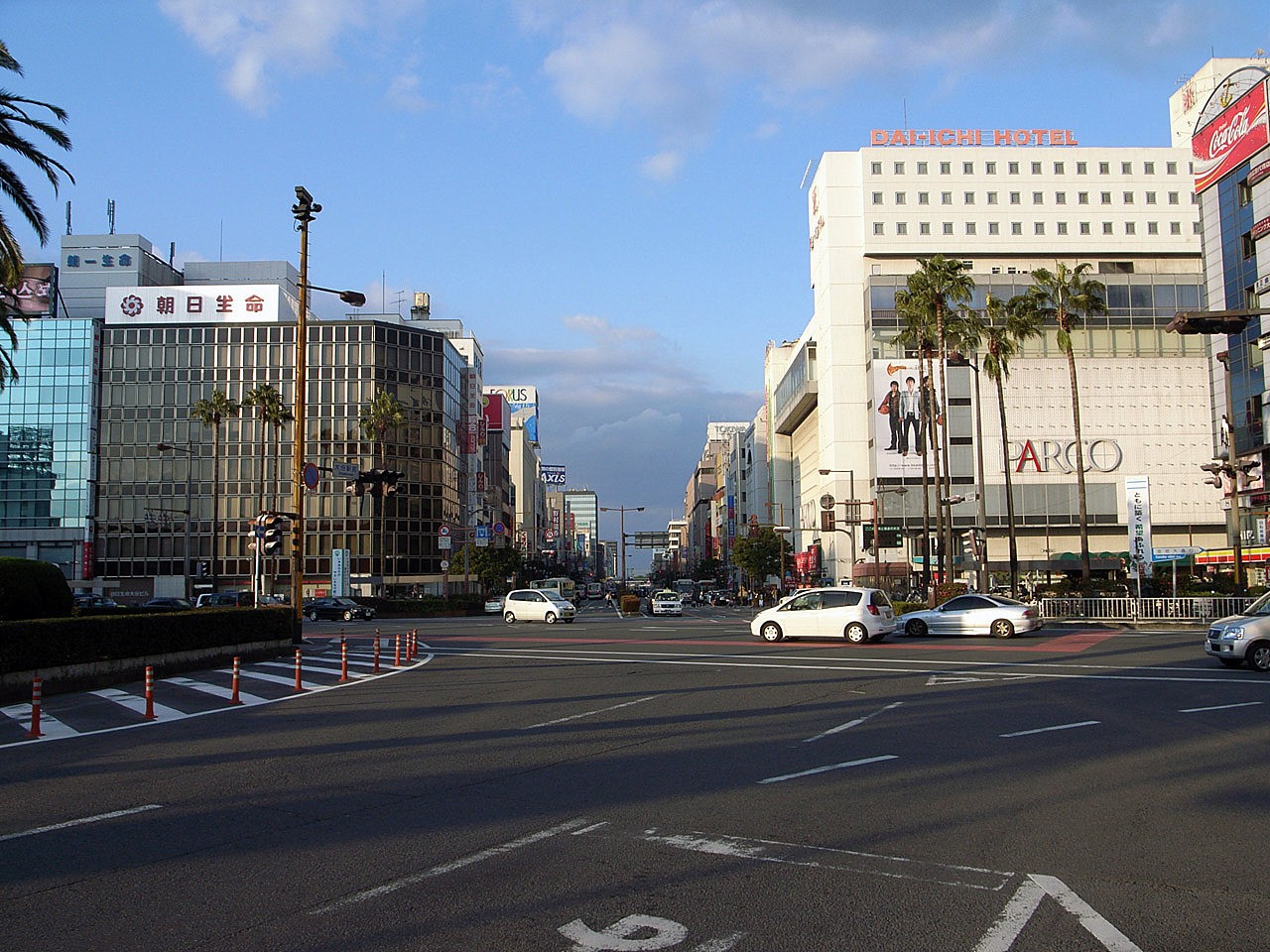
Main street of Ōita

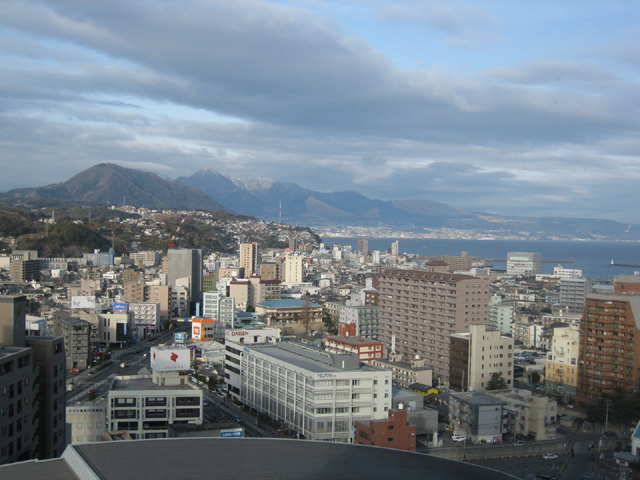
City view from city centre

Ōita (大分市, Ōita-shi; Japanese pronunciation: [ó̞ò̞.ì.tä̀, ò̞ó̞.í.tä́(.ɕì), ó̞ó̞.í.tä́(.ɕì)]) is the capital city of Ōita Prefecture, located on the island of Kyushu, Japan. As of 30 November 2023, the city had an estimated population of 474,804 in 230,867 households, and a population density of 950 persons per km^{2}. The total area of the city is 502.38 km^{2} (193.97 sq mi).

== Geography ==
Ōita city is located in east-central Ōita Prefecture, facing Beppu Bay on the Seto Inland Sea. The Ōno River flows from the south to the east, and the Ōita River flows from the west to the west, with the main urban center on the west side of the mouth of the Ōita River, with the Ōita Plain consisting of deltas and alluvial plains formed by the Ōita River and the Ōno River, and surrounding hills. The Takashima area in of the city is within the borders of the Seto Inland Sea National Park.

=== Neighboring municipalities ===
Ōita Prefecture

- Beppu to the northwest
- Bungo-Ōno to the south
- Taketa to the southwest
- Usuki to the southeast
- Yufu to the west

=== Climate ===
Ōita has a humid subtropical climate (Köppen Cfa) characterized by warm summers and cool winters with light to no snowfall. The average annual temperature in Ōita is 15.6 °C. The average annual rainfall is 1663 mm with September as the wettest month. The temperatures are highest on average in August, at around 26.3 °C, and lowest in January, at around 5.1 °C.

Climate data for Oita City (Nagahama District), elevation 5 meters (1991-2020 normals, extremes 1887-present)
Month	Jan	Feb	Mar	Apr	May	Jun	Jul	Aug	Sep	Oct	Nov	Dec	Year
Record high °C (°F)	24.6 (76.3)	25.5 (77.9)	29.3 (84.7)	31.2 (88.2)	32.7 (90.9)	35.4 (95.7)	37.8 (100.0)	37.6 (99.7)	36.5 (97.7)	33.1 (91.6)	28.0 (82.4)	25.0 (77.0)	37.8 (100.0)
Mean maximum °C (°F)	16.5 (61.7)	18.7 (65.7)	22.3 (72.1)	26.3 (79.3)	29.6 (85.3)	32.6 (90.7)	35.4 (95.7)	35.7 (96.3)	33.2 (91.8)	28.7 (83.7)	23.6 (74.5)	18.8 (65.8)	36.1 (97.0)
Mean daily maximum °C (°F)	10.7 (51.3)	11.5 (52.7)	14.6 (58.3)	19.7 (67.5)	24.1 (75.4)	26.5 (79.7)	30.9 (87.6)	32.2 (90.0)	28.2 (82.8)	23.3 (73.9)	18.1 (64.6)	13.0 (55.4)	21.1 (70.0)
Daily mean °C (°F)	6.5 (43.7)	7.2 (45.0)	10.2 (50.4)	14.8 (58.6)	19.3 (66.7)	22.6 (72.7)	26.8 (80.2)	27.7 (81.9)	24.2 (75.6)	19.1 (66.4)	13.8 (56.8)	8.7 (47.7)	16.8 (62.2)
Mean daily minimum °C (°F)	2.6 (36.7)	3.0 (37.4)	5.9 (42.6)	10.3 (50.5)	15.0 (59.0)	19.3 (66.7)	23.5 (74.3)	24.3 (75.7)	20.9 (69.6)	15.2 (59.4)	9.5 (49.1)	4.6 (40.3)	12.8 (55.0)
Mean minimum °C (°F)	−1.8 (28.8)	−1.7 (28.9)	−0.1 (31.8)	3.6 (38.5)	9.6 (49.3)	15.0 (59.0)	20.2 (68.4)	21.2 (70.2)	15.9 (60.6)	9.6 (49.3)	3.4 (38.1)	−0.5 (31.1)	−2.4 (27.7)
Record low °C (°F)	−7.3 (18.9)	−7.8 (18.0)	−5.2 (22.6)	−2.1 (28.2)	1.7 (35.1)	7.2 (45.0)	14.0 (57.2)	14.1 (57.4)	8.8 (47.8)	2.0 (35.6)	−2.0 (28.4)	−6.1 (21.0)	−7.8 (18.0)
Average precipitation mm (inches)	49.8 (1.96)	64.1 (2.52)	99.2 (3.91)	119.7 (4.71)	133.6 (5.26)	313.6 (12.35)	261.3 (10.29)	165.7 (6.52)	255.2 (10.05)	144.8 (5.70)	72.9 (2.87)	47.1 (1.85)	1,727 (67.99)
Average snowfall cm (inches)	0 (0)	0 (0)	0 (0)	0 (0)	0 (0)	0 (0)	0 (0)	0 (0)	0 (0)	0 (0)	0 (0)	0 (0)	1 (0.4)
Average precipitation days (≥ 0.5 mm)	5.9	7.7	10.0	10.0	9.7	14.0	12.0	10.6	11.1	7.7	6.9	5.5	111.0
Average snowy days	6.4	4.6	1.5	0.0	0.0	0.0	0.0	0.0	0.0	0.0	0.1	4.6	17.3
Average relative humidity (%)	62	63	65	65	68	77	77	75	74	70	69	64	69
Mean monthly sunshine hours	149.4	149.1	175.0	190.1	194.6	135.7	180.8	202.8	151.5	164.2	148.2	151.2	1,992.4
Source: Japan Meteorological Agency

== Demographics ==
Ōita is the most populous city in Ōita Prefecture. Per Japanese census data, the population of Ōita is as shown below

Historical population
Year	Pop.	±%
1960	242,001	—
1970	289,951	+19.8%
1980	385,635	+33.0%
1990	429,927	+11.5%
2000	454,424	+5.7%
2010	473,955	+4.3%
2020	477,393	+0.7%

== History ==
The area of Ōita city was part of ancient Bungo Province, and the location of the Bungo Kokubun-ji and presumably the Bungo kokufu were located in this area. According to the Bungo no Kuni Fudoki, the name Ōita was given by Emperor Keiko when he visited this area in the late Kofun period; however, the main urban center was the port of Funai (府内) on the coast. During the Kamakura period, the Ōtomo clan was appointed shugo of the province, and made Funai their jōkamachi. By the Sengoku period, the Ōtomo has conquered most of Kyushu and had embraced Nanban culture, with Funai becoming a stronghold of the Kirishitan religion and western technology. However, the Ōtomo were destroyed by the Shimazu clan and after the establishment of the Tokugawa shogunate, their territories were divided, with Funai becoming the center of Funai Domain ruled by the Ogyū-Matsudaira clan.

The town of Ōita was established on 1 May 1889 with the creation of the modern municipalities system, and was raised to city status in 1911. On 1 April 1997, it was designated as a core city with greater local autonomy.

On 1 January 2005, the town of Notsuharu (from Ōita District) and the town of Saganoseki (from Kitaamabe District) were merged into Ōita.

== Government ==
Ōita has a mayor-council form of government with a directly elected mayor and a unicameral city council of 44 members. Ōita contributes 13 members to the Ōita Prefectural Assembly. In terms of national politics, the city is divided between the Ōita 1st district and Ōita 2nd district of the lower house of the Diet of Japan.

== Economy ==
During the 1960s and 1970s, an industrial region was formed along the Beppu Gulf coast. Among the plants in the region were flagship plants of Nippon Steel and Showa Denko.

In the 1970s, Toshiba and Canon built and expanded their plants in inland area. By then, the city emerged as a major production center of electronics products such as LSIs and digital cameras.

The downtown and shopping districts are located to the north of Oita Station. However, the area has been gradually declining because the main commercial areas have been dispersed due to the construction of big shopping malls in the suburbs.

== Education ==
=== National universities ===
- Oita University

=== Prefectural universities ===
- Oita Prefectural College of Arts and Culture
- Oita University of Nursing and Health Sciences

=== Private universities ===
- Beppu University – Oita Campus
- Nippon Bunri University
- Oita Junior College
- Ritsumeikan Asia Pacific University

=== Primary and secondary schools ===
Ōita has 54 public elementary schools, 25 public junior high schools, and two combined elementary/junior high schools operated by the city government. The city has 14 public high schools and one combined middle/high school operated by the Ōita Prefectural Board of Education, six private high schools and three private combined middle/high schools. The city also operates four and the prefecture operates one special education schools for the handicapped.

== Transportation ==
=== Airport ===
Oita Airport is located in neighbouring Kunisaki, and is accessible by bus, taxi, private vehicle, and hovercraft.

=== Railways ===
The luxury Aru Ressha train was designed by Eiji Mitooka. It runs between Ōita and Hita and is in service to also revive tourism and the local economy. JR Kyushu - Nippō Main Line

- Nishi-Ōita - Ōita - Maki - Takajō - Tsurusaki - Ōzai - Sakanoichi - Kōzaki

JR Kyushu - Hōhi Main Line

- Takenaka - Naka-Handa - Ōita-Daigaku-mae - Shikido - Takio - Ōita

JR Kyushu - Kyūdai Main Line

- Bungo-Kokubu - Kaku - Minami-Ōita - Furugō - Ōita

=== Highways ===
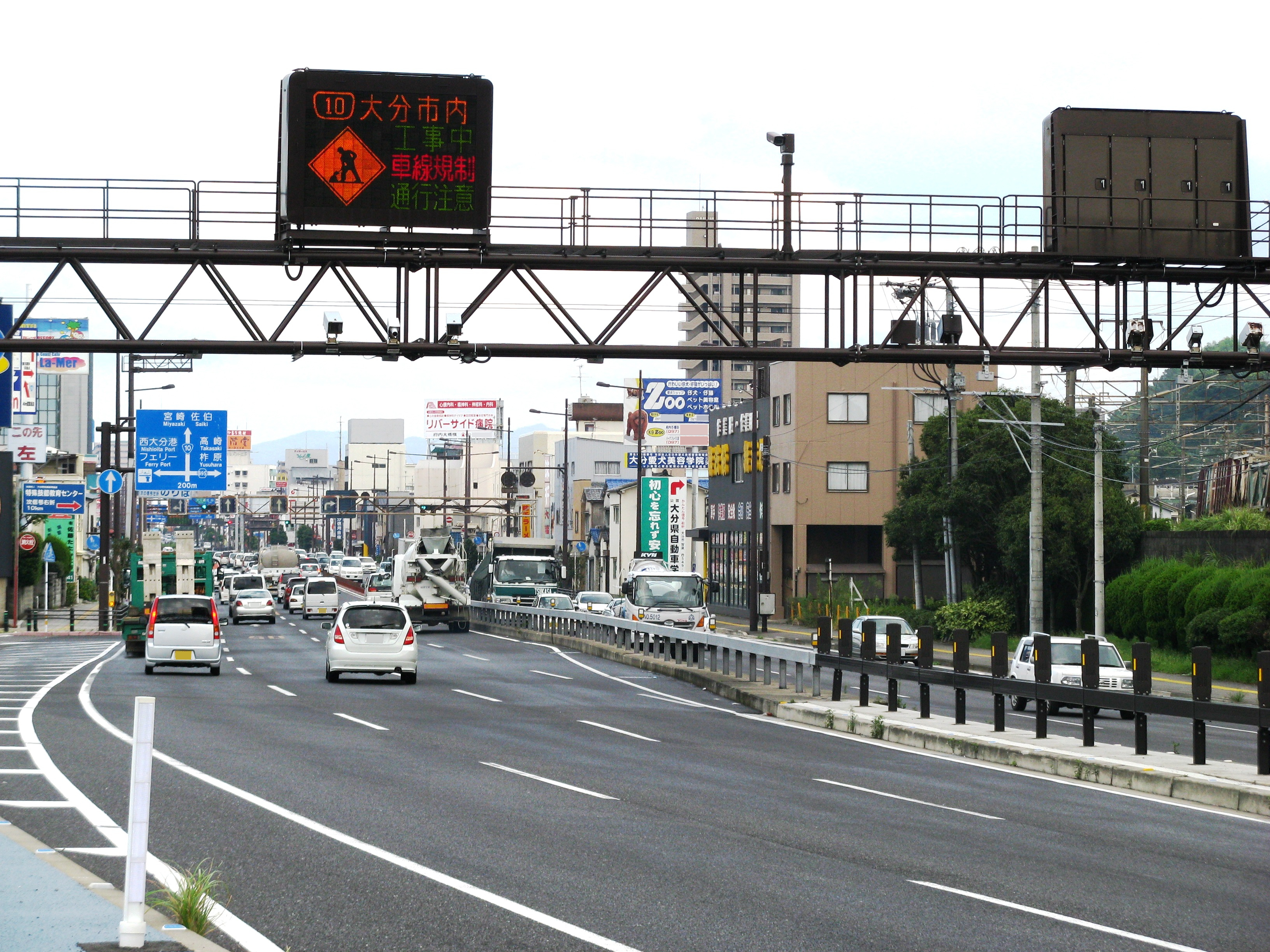
Japan National Route 10 at Oita, Oita

- Higashikyushu Expressway
- National Route 10
- National Route 57
- National Route 197
- National Route 210
- National Route 217
- National Route 442

=== Ports ===
- Port of Oita

== Sister cities ==
- Austin, Texas, United States, sister city since October 1990
- Aveiro, Portugal, sister city since October 1978
- Guangzhou, China, exchange promotion city partnership since September 1997
- Wuhan, China, friendship city since September 1979

== Local attractions ==
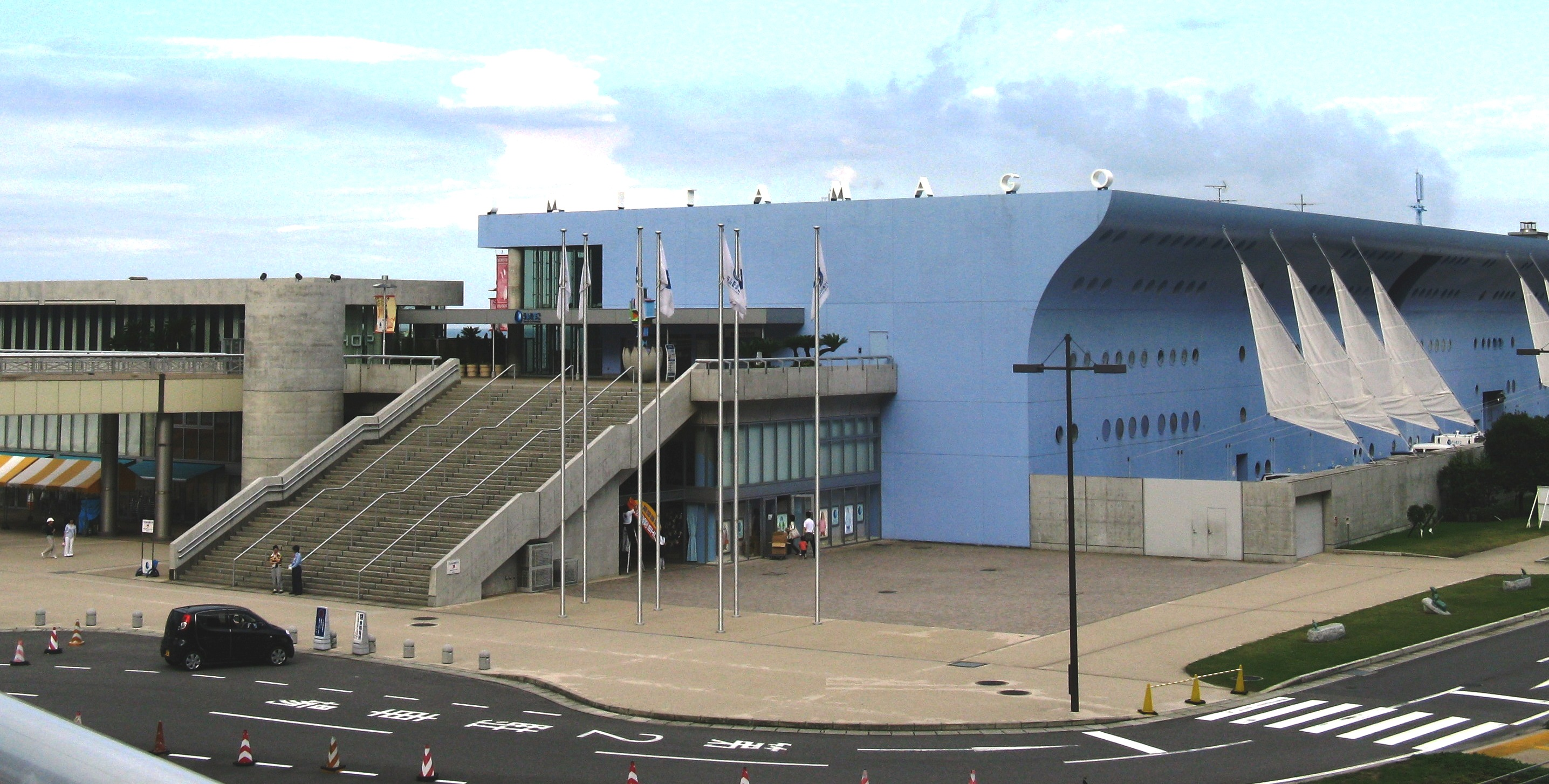
Marine Palace AKA "Umi Tamago"

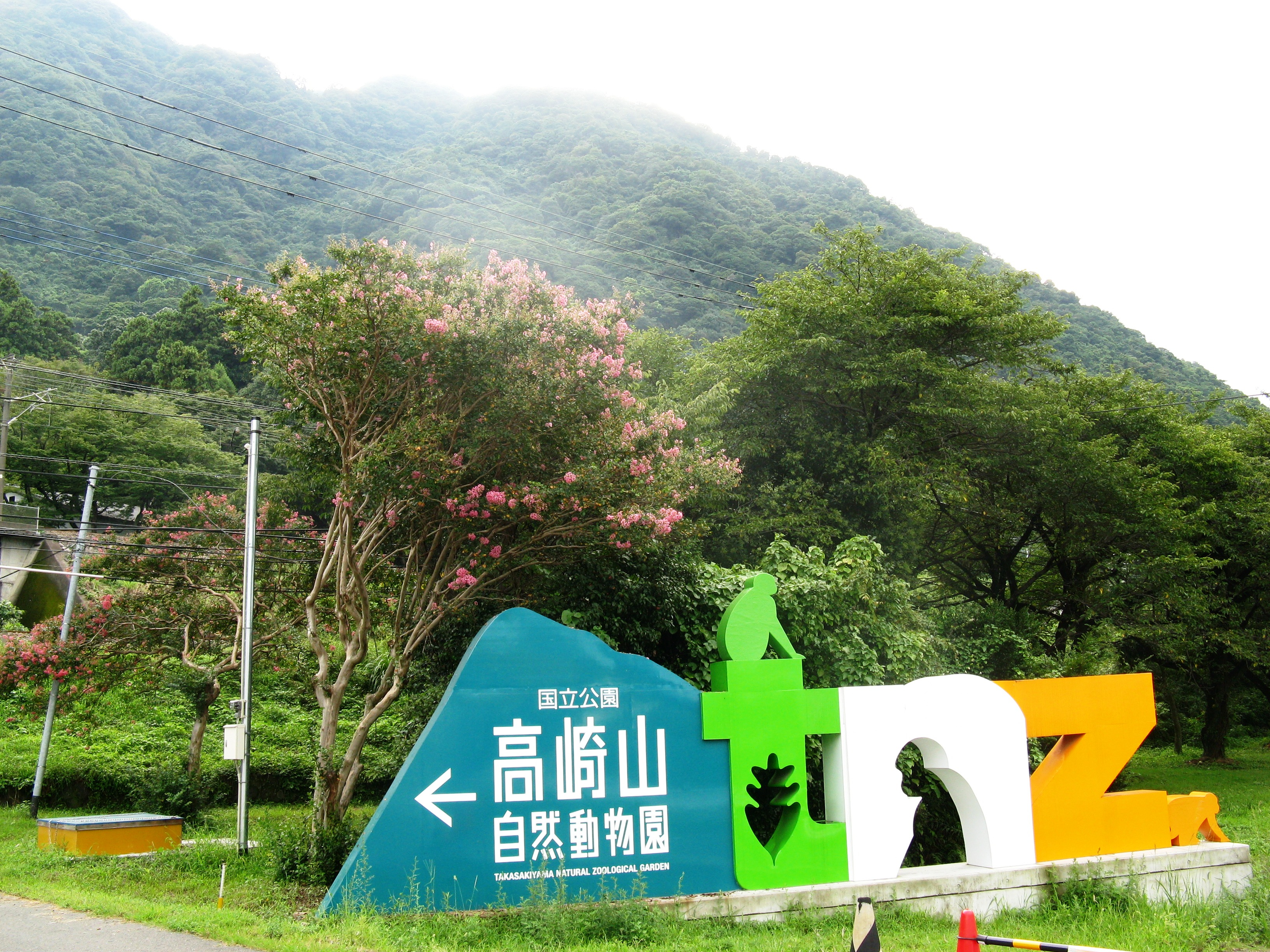
Takasaki Mountain

- Resonac Dome Oita (originally the Ōita Stadium), also known as Big Eye, is situated along the city expressway. It is the home field of the J.League football club Ōita Trinita and is used for large local events.
- Takasaki Mountain (高崎山) that borders Beppu is famous for wild monkeys, specifically the Japanese macaque. Facing the entrance to the Takasaki-yama park is the "Oita Marine Palace Aquarium", also known as "Umi-Tamago", or "Sea Egg".

== Festivals and events ==
- The Ōita Tanabata Festival (大分七夕まつり, Ōita Tanabata Matsuri) is annually held on the first weekend of August. On the first night of the festival, an event called Funai Pacchin (府内戦紙) in which Matsuri floats depicting warriors are paraded through the central streets of the city is held.
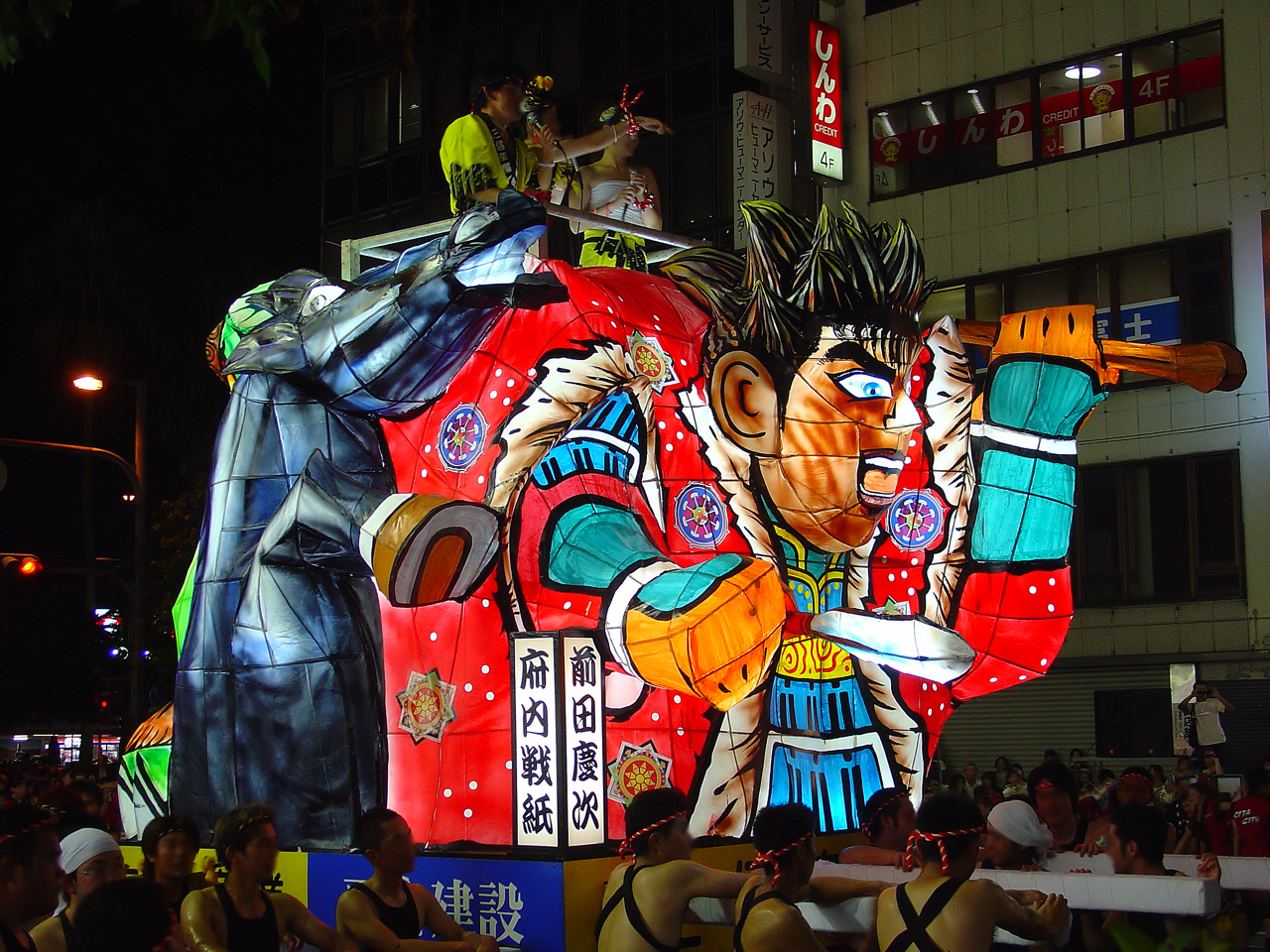
  Funai Pacchin float

== Sports ==
Annual sporting events include:

- Beppu-Oita Mainichi Marathon, which traces a path between Ōita and its neighbouring city of Beppu. The competition has been held every year since 1952 and is classed as an IAAF Silver Label road race.
- The Kyūshū Ekiden, beginning in Nagasaki and ending in Fukuoka, the world's longest relay race

Sporting events held in Oita include:

- 1966 National Sports Festival of Japan
- 2001 Kirin Cup
- 2002 FIFA World Cup
- 2003, 2006, 2007 Kirin Challenge Cup
- 2005 J. League All-Star Soccer
- 2019 Rugby World Cup

=== Sports teams and facilities ===
Club	Sports	League	Venue	Established
Ōita Trinita	Football	J.League; Division 1	Resonac Dome Oita	1994 (as Ōita Trinity, changed to current name in 1999)
Vasagey Oita	Futsal	F.League	Oita Prefectural General Gymnasium	2003
Oita Miyoshi Weisse Adler	Volleyball	V.League	Toto Oita factory gymnasium	1996 (as Miyoshi Department of Cardiology EKG, changed to current name in 2006)

== Notable people from Ōita ==
- Mao Abe, singer-songwriter
- Takamasa Anai, judo wrestler
- Yuya Ando, baseball player
- Misa Etō, former Nogizaka46
- Eri Fukatsu, actress
- Sōsuke Genda, baseball player
- Arata Isozaki, architect
- Yūko Kotegawa, actress
- Atsuhiro Miura, football player
- Daisuke Miyazaki, handball player
- Tomiichi Murayama, 81st Prime Minister of Japan
- Shigeichi Nagano, photographer
- Chiyotaikai Ryūji, sumo wrestler
- Yūsuke Santamaria, tarento
- Rino Sashihara, HKT48, former AKB48
- Kenichi Shinoda, yakuza, sixth chairman of the Yamaguchi-gumi
- Skull Reaper A-ji, professional wrestler, mahjong player and politician
- Seiichi Uchikawa, baseball player
- Naomi Zaizen, actress

== See also ==
- 2025 Ōita fire
