= National Police Agency (Japan) =

Japanese central coordination law enforcement agency

National Police Agency 警察庁 Keisatsu-chō

- The Kyokujitsushou
- Abbreviation: NPA

Agency overview
- Formed: July 1, 1954
- Preceding agency: National Rural Police Headquarters (国家地方警察本部, Kokka Chihō Keisatsu Honbu)
- Employees: 7,995 (2020)
- Annual budget: ¥360.348 billion (2020)
- Legal personality: Law enforcement agency

Jurisdictional structure
- National agency: Japan
- Operations jurisdiction: Japan

Operational structure
- Headquarters: 2-1-2 Kasumigaseki, Chiyoda, Tokyo 100-8974, Japan
- Civilians: 4,800
- Agency executive: Yoshinobu Kusunoki, Commissioner General
- Parent agency: National Public Safety Commission
- Child agencies: National Police Academy; National Research Institute of Police Science; Imperial Guard Headquarters
- Bureaus: 5: Community Safety; Criminal Investigation; Traffic Bureau; Security Bureau; Cyber Affairs
- Regional Bureaus: 6: Tōhoku—covering prefectures: Aomori; Iwate; Miyagi; Akita; Yamagata; Fukushima; Kantō—covering prefectures: Ibaraki; Tochigi; Gunma; Saitama; Chiba; Kanagawa; Niigata; Yamanashi; Nagano; Shizuoka; Chūbu—covering prefectures: Toyama; Ishikawa; Fukui; Gifu; Aichi; Mie; Kinki—covering prefectures: Shiga; Kyoto; Osaka; Hyogo; Nara; Wakayama; Chūgoku–Shikoku—covering prefectures: Tottori; Shimane; Okayama; Hiroshima; Yamaguchi; Tokushima; Kagawa; Ehime; Kochi; Kyūshū—covering prefectures: Fukuoka; Saga; Nagasaki; Kumamoto; Oita; Miyazaki; Kagoshima; Okinawa

Website
- www.npa.go.jp/english/index.html (in English) www.npa.go.jp (in Japanese)

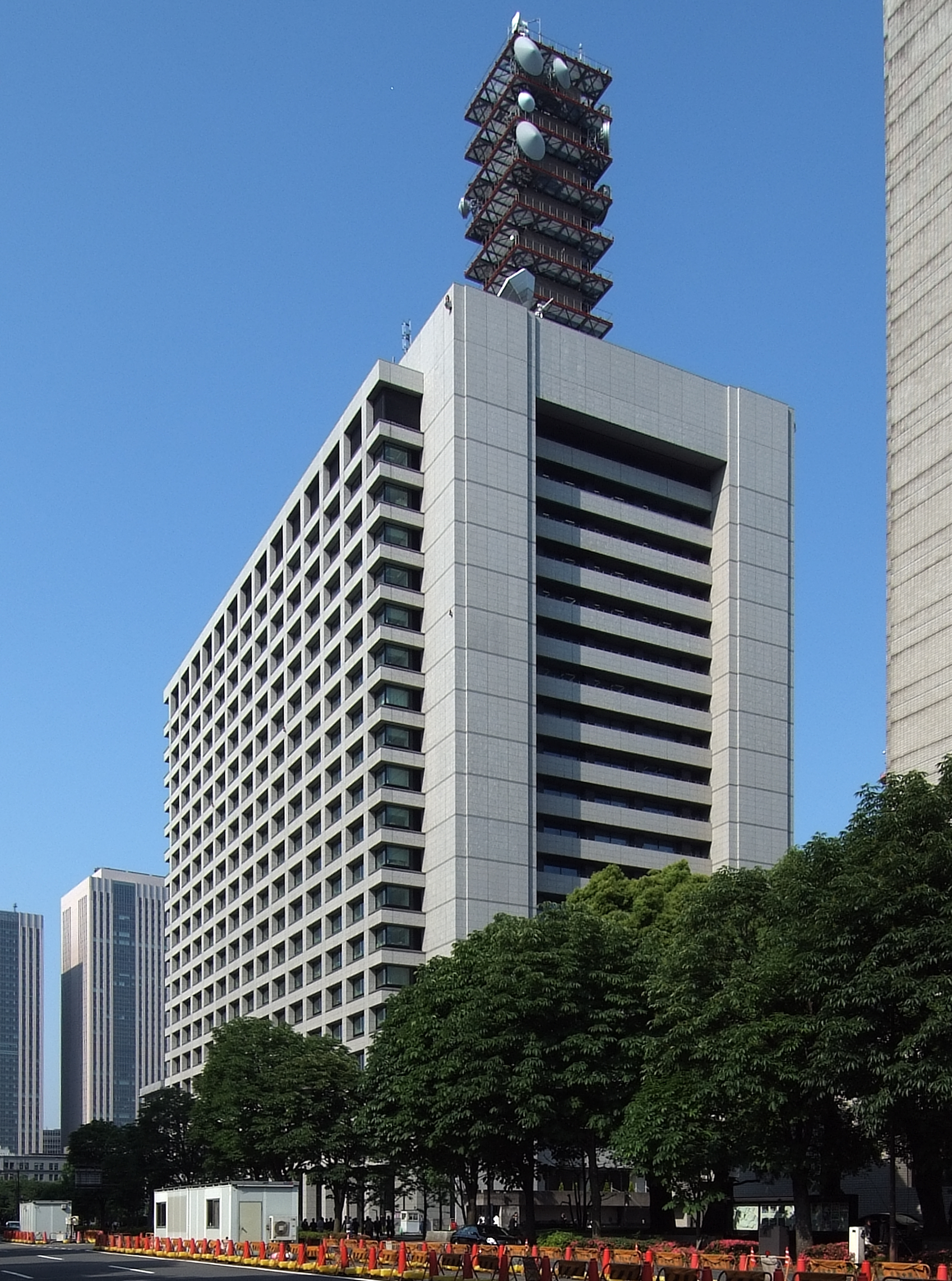
2nd Building of the Central Common Government Office, the building which houses the agency

The National Police Agency (Japanese: 警察庁, Hepburn: Keisatsu-chō) is the central coordinating law enforcement agency of the Japanese police system. Unlike national police in other countries, the NPA does not have any operational units of its own aside from the Imperial Guard; rather, it is responsible for supervising Japan's 47 prefectural police departments and determining their general standards and policies, though it can command police agencies under it in national emergencies or large-scale disasters. It is under the National Public Safety Commission of the Cabinet Office.

As of 2017, the NPA has a strength of approximately 7,800 personnel: 2,100 sworn officers, 900 guards, and 4,800 civilian staff.

== History ==
Police services of the Empire of Japan were placed under complete centralized control with the Police Affairs Bureau (警保局, Keiho-kyoku) of the Home Ministry at their core. But after the surrender of Japan, the Supreme Commander for the Allied Powers regarded this centralized police system as undemocratic.

During the occupation, the principle of decentralization was introduced by the 1947 Police Law. Cities and large towns had their own municipal police services (自治体警察, Jichitai Keisatsu), and the National Rural Police (国家地方警察, Kokka Chihō Keisatsu) was responsible for smaller towns, villages and rural areas. But most Japanese municipalities were too small to have a large police force, so sometimes they were unable to deal with large-scale violence. In addition, excessive fragmentation of the police organization reduced the efficiency of police activities.

As a response to these problems, complete restructuring created a more centralized system under the 1954 amended Police Law. All operational units except for the Imperial Guard were reorganized into prefectural police for each prefecture, and the National Police Agency was established as the central coordinating agency for these Police Departments.

On April 1, 2022, the NPA created the Cyber Affairs Bureau and the National Cyber Unit. In December 2023, the NPA announced that the TAIT (Telecom Scam Allianced Investigation Team) will be established in April 2024 to unify investigation efforts across Japan on fraud cases.

Since 2022, the number of people coming forward with racial profiling complaints against Japan's National Police Agency has grown. Foreigners are acknowledged to have been frequent racial profiling targets, with numerous racial profiling incidents not documented by police.

== Organization ==
=== Leadership ===
The Commissioner General of the National Police Agency (警察庁長官, Keisatsu-chō Chōkan) is the highest ranking police officer of Japan, regarded as an exception to the regular class structure. For the Deputy Commissioner General (次長, Jichō), the Senior Commissioner is supplemented. The Commissioner General's Secretariat (長官官房, Chōkan Kanbō) are their staff. The civilian political leadership is provided by the National Public Safety Commission.

=== Internal Bureaus ===
==== Community Safety Bureau ====
The Community Safety Bureau (生活安全局, Seikatsu Anzen-kyoku) is responsible for crime prevention, combating juvenile delinquency, and pollution control.

This bureau was derived from the Safety Division of the Criminal Affairs Bureau in 1994.

- Community Safety Planning Division (生活安全企画課)
- Personal Safety and Juvenile Division (人身安全・少年課)
- Safety Division (保安課)
- Director for Economic Crimes Investigation (生活経済対策管理官)

==== Criminal Affairs Bureau ====
The Criminal Affairs Bureau (刑事局, Keiji-kyoku) is in charge of research statistics and coordination of the criminal investigation of nationally important and international cases.

- (Direct reporting divisions)
  - Criminal Affairs Planning Division (刑事企画課)
  - First Investigation Division (捜査第一課)
  - Second Investigation Division (捜査第二課)
  - Director for Criminal Intelligence Support (捜査支援分析管理官)
  - Director for Criminal Identification (犯罪鑑識官)
- Organized Crime Department (組織犯罪対策部)
  - First Organized Crime Division (組織犯罪対策第一課)
  - Second Organized Crime Division (組織犯罪対策第二課)
  - Director for International Investigative Operations (国際捜査管理官)

==== Traffic Bureau ====
The Traffic Bureau (交通局, Kōtsū-kyoku) is responsible for traffic policing and regulations. This bureau was derived from the Safety Bureau (保安局, Hoan-kyoku) (later merged with the Criminal Affairs Bureau; predecessor of the Community Safety Bureau) in 1962 because of the expression indicating a high number of deaths from traffic accidents.

- Traffic Planning Division (交通企画課)
- Traffic Enforcement Division (交通指導課)
- Traffic Management and Control Division (交通規制課)
- License Division (運転免許課)

==== Security Bureau ====
The Security Bureau (警備局, Keibi-kyoku) is in charge of the internal security affairs, such as counter-intelligence, counter-terrorism or disaster response.

- (Direct reporting divisions)
  - Security Planning Division (警備企画課)
  - Public Security Division (公安課)
- Foreign Affairs and Intelligence Department (外事情報部)
  - Foreign Affairs Division (外事課)
  - Counter International Terrorism Division (国際テロリズム対策課)
- Security Operations Department (警備運用部)
  - 1st Security Operations Division (警備第一課)
  - 2nd Security Operations Division (警備第二課)
  - 3rd Security Operations Division (警備第三課)

After the 1996 Japanese embassy hostage crisis in Peru, the Security Bureau established the Terrorism Response Team where officers liaise with foreign law enforcement and intelligence agencies when Japanese interests or nationals are in danger. It was later reformed to the Terrorism Response Team - Tactical Wing (TRT-2) for Overseas in order to meet with demands to coordinate with foreign police forces in assisting them whenever a terror attack has happened.

==== Cyber Affairs bureau ====
The Cyber Affairs bureau (サイバー警察局, Saibā keisatsu-kyoku) is in charge of policing in cyberspace, combat with cybercrime and cyberterrorism. This bureau was restructured from the Info-Communications Bureau in 2022 by integrating cyber-related divisions in several bureaus.

- Cyber-Policy Planning Division (サイバー企画課)
- Cybercrime Investigation Division (サイバー捜査課)
- Digital Analysis Division (情報技術解析課)

=== Local Branch Bureaus and Departments ===
==== Regional Police Bureaus ====
There are six Regional Police Bureaus (管区警察局), each responsible for a number of prefectures as below:

Tōhoku Regional Police Bureau (東北管区警察局, Tōhoku Kanku Keisatsu-kyoku)
Aomori, Iwate, Miyagi, Akita, Yamagata, and Fukushima Prefectures
Kantō Regional Police Bureau (関東管区警察局, Kantō Kanku Keisatsu-kyoku)
Ibaraki, Tochigi, Gunma, Saitama, Chiba, Kanagawa, Niigata, Yamanashi, Nagano, and Shizuoka Prefectures
Chūbu Regional Police Bureau (中部管区警察局, Chūbu Kanku Keisatsu-kyoku)
Toyama, Ishikawa, Fukui, Gifu, Aichi, and Mie Prefectures
Kinki Regional Police Bureau (近畿管区警察局, Kinki Kanku Keisatsu-kyoku)
Shiga, Kyoto, Osaka, Hyogo, Nara, and Wakayama Prefectures
Chūgoku–Shikoku Regional Police Bureau (中国四国管区警察局, Chūgoku Shikoku Kanku Keisatsu-kyoku)
Tottori, Shimane, Okayama, Hiroshima, and Yamaguchi Prefectures
Tokushima, Kagawa, Ehime, and Kochi Prefectures
Kyūshū Regional Police Bureau (九州管区警察局, Kyūshū Kanku Keisatsu-kyoku)
Fukuoka, Saga, Nagasaki, Kumamoto, Oita, Miyazaki, Kagoshima, and Okinawa Prefectures

They are located in major cities of each geographic region. The Tokyo Metropolitan Police Department and Hokkaido Prefectural Police Headquarters are excluded from the jurisdiction of regional police bureaus. Headed by a Senior Commissioner, each regional police bureaus exercises necessary control and supervision over and provides support services to prefectural police within its jurisdiction, under the authority and orders of NPA's Commissioner General. Attached to each Regional Police Bureaus is a Regional Police School which provides police personnel with education and training required of staff officers as well as other necessary education and training.

==== Police Communications Departments ====
Metropolitan Tokyo and the island of Hokkaidō are excluded from the regional jurisdictions and are run more autonomously than other local forces, in the case of Tokyo, because of its special urban situation, and of Hokkaidō, because of its distinctive geography. The National Police Agency maintains police communications divisions in these two areas to handle any coordination needed between national and local forces. In other area, Police Communications Departments are established within each Regional Police Bureaus.

- Independent Communications Departments
  - Tokyo Metropolitan Police Info-Communications Department (東京都警察情報通信部, Tōkyō-to Keisatsu Jōhō Tsūshin-bu)
  - Hokkaido Police Info-Communications Department (北海道警察通信情報部, Hokkaidō Keisatsu Tsūshin Jōhō-bu)

=== Subsidiary Organs ===
- National Police Academy (警察大学校, Keisatsu Dai-gakkō)
- National Research Institute of Police Science (科学警察研究所, Kagaku Keisatsu Kenkyū-sho)
- Imperial Guard Headquarters (皇宮警察本部, Kōgū-Keisatsu Honbu)

== See also ==
- Police services of the Empire of Japan
- Law enforcement in Japan
- Public order and internal security in Japan
- Fire and Disaster Management Agency
