= Oita Prefectural College of Arts and Culture =

Coordinates: 33°13′25″N 131°36′56″E

- 大分県立芸術文化短期大学
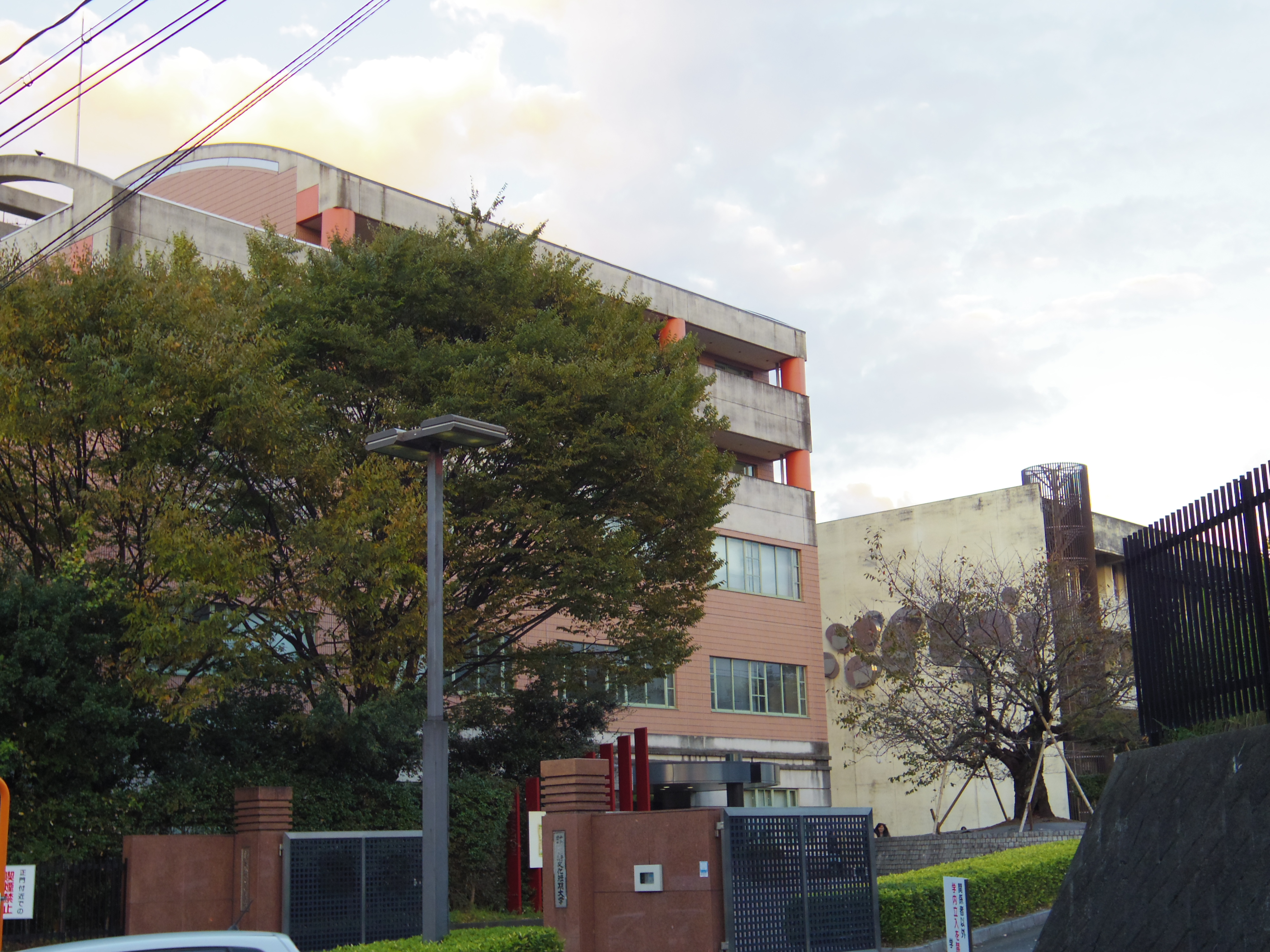
- Main entrance
- Type: Public
- Established: 1961
- President: Kingo Nakayama
- Location: Ōita, Ōita, Japan
- Website: Official website

Oita Prefectural College of Arts and Culture (大分県立芸術文化短期大学, Ōita-kenritsu geijutsu bunka tanki daigaku) is a public junior college in Ōita, Ōita Prefecture, Japan, established in 1961. The university has departments in art, music, global studies, and information and communication.
