= Maki Station (Ōita) =

Railway station in Ōita, Ōita Prefecture, Japan

Maki Station 牧駅
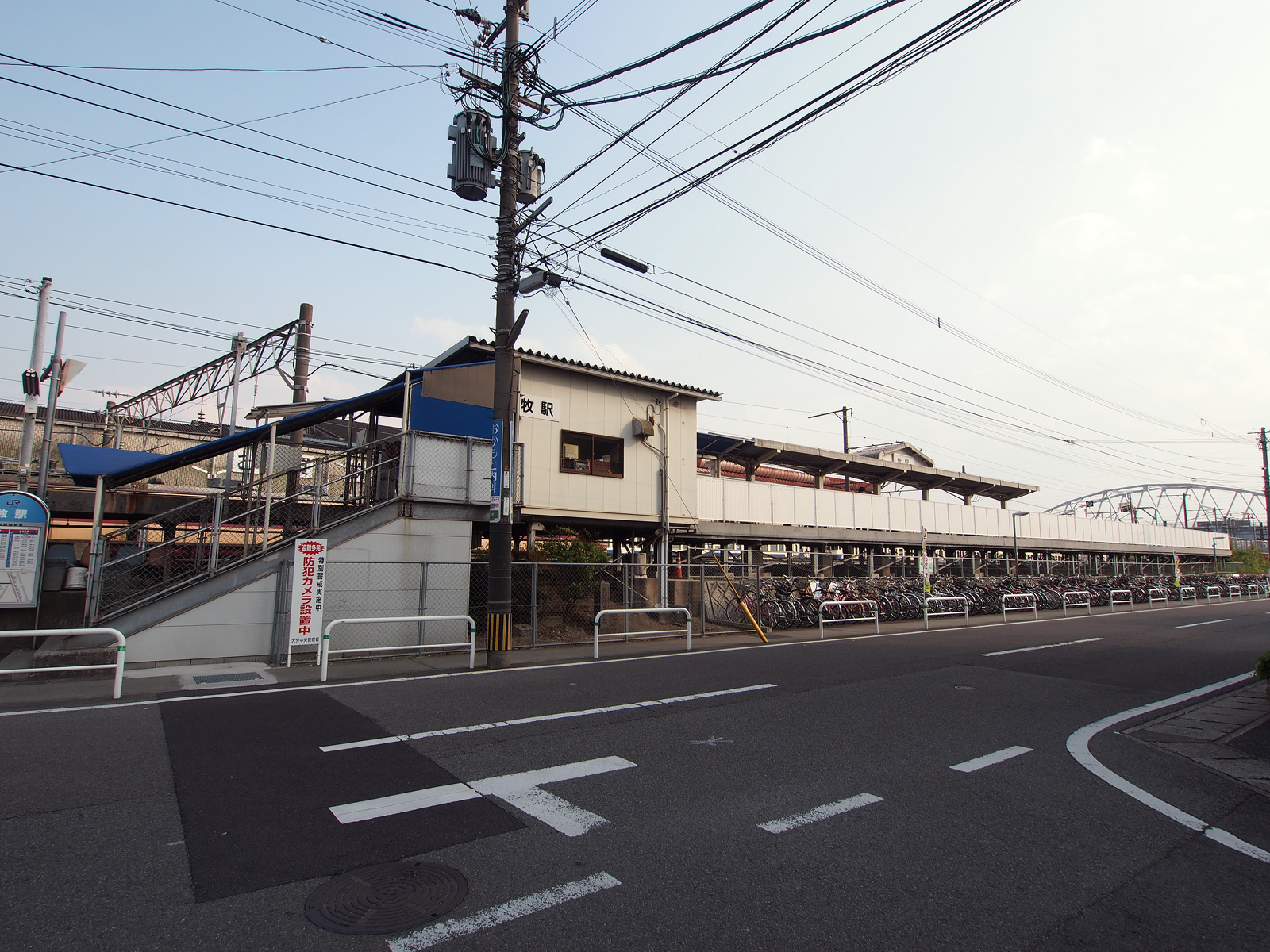
- Maki Station in 2013

General information
- Location: 1 Makikamimachi, Ōita-shi, Ōita-ken, 870-0925; Japan
- Coordinates: 33°14′14″N 131°38′16″E
- Operator: JR Kyushu
- Line: ■ Nippō Main Line
- Distance: 136.2 km from Kokura
- Platforms: 1 side platform
- Tracks: 1

Construction
- Structure type: Elevated
- Cycle facilities: Bike shed
- Accessible: No - steps to platform

Other information
- Status: Remotely managed station
- Website: Official website

History
- Opened: 22 February 1987

Passengers
- FY2016: 752 daily
- Rank: 196th (among JR Kyushu stations)

Services
Preceding station	JR Kyushu	Following station
Takajō towards Kagoshima	Nippō Main Line	Ōita towards Kokura
Location
- Location within Oita Prefecture Location within Japan

Maki Station (牧駅, Maki-eki) is a passenger railway station located in the city of Saiki, Ōita, Japan. It is operated by JR Kyushu.

== Lines ==
The station is served by the Nippō Main Line and is located 136.2 km from the starting point of the line at Kokura.

== Layout ==
The station consists of a side platform serving a single elevated track. There is no station building, only a shelter on the platform for waiting passengers and an automatic ticket vending machine. A small shed on the platform that housed a ticket window has now become unstaffed. To the south and southwest of the station are the extensive sidings of the Ōita Branch Vehicle Centre, one of JR Kyushu's major rail depots.

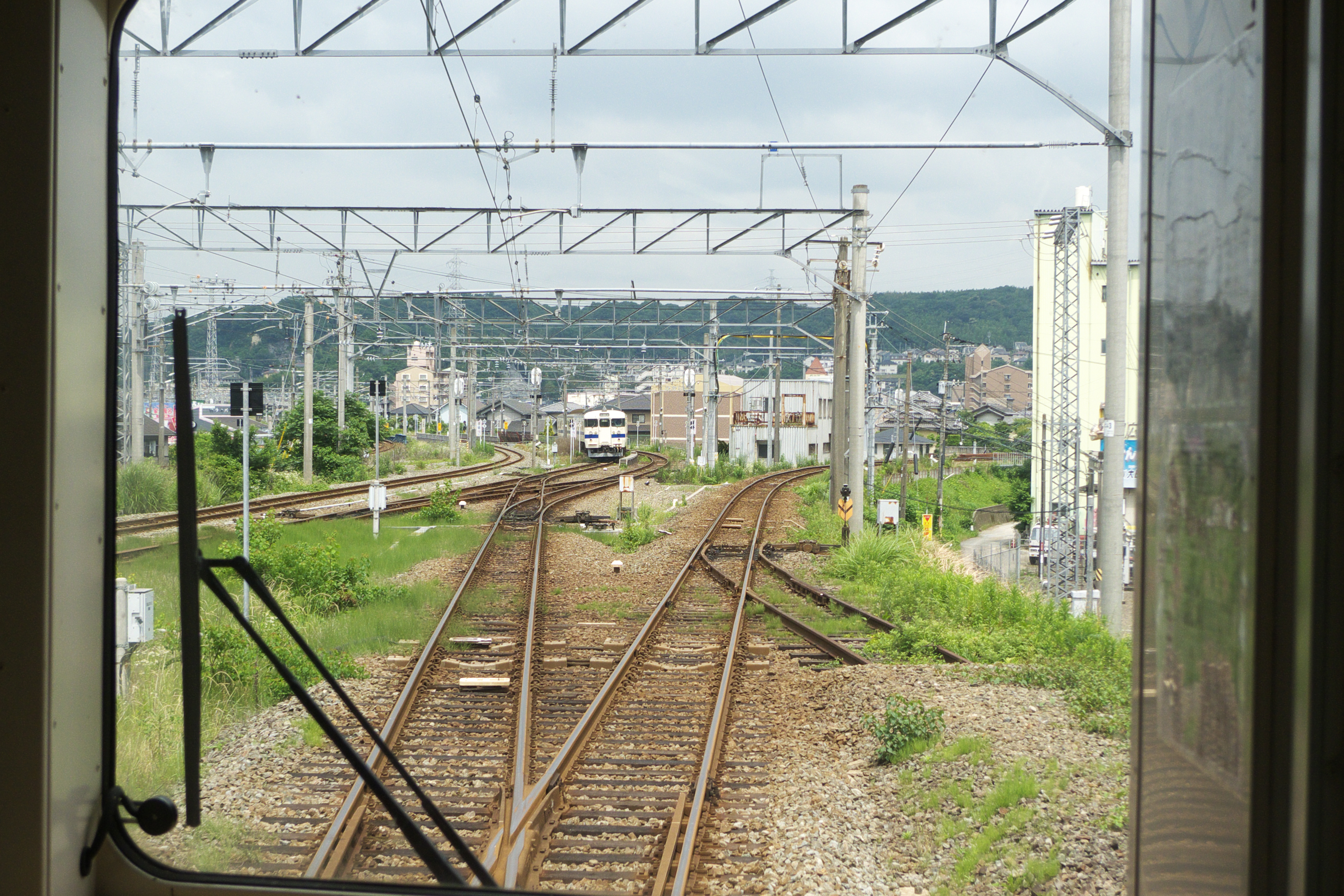
The Shimogōri Signal Box from Ōita. The track turns left for Maki, right for Takio on the Hōhi Main Line.

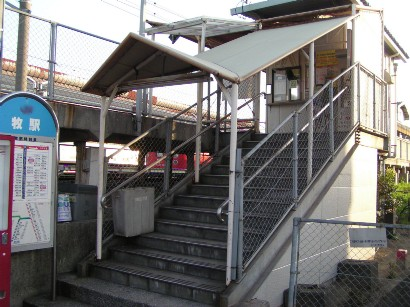
Station entrance

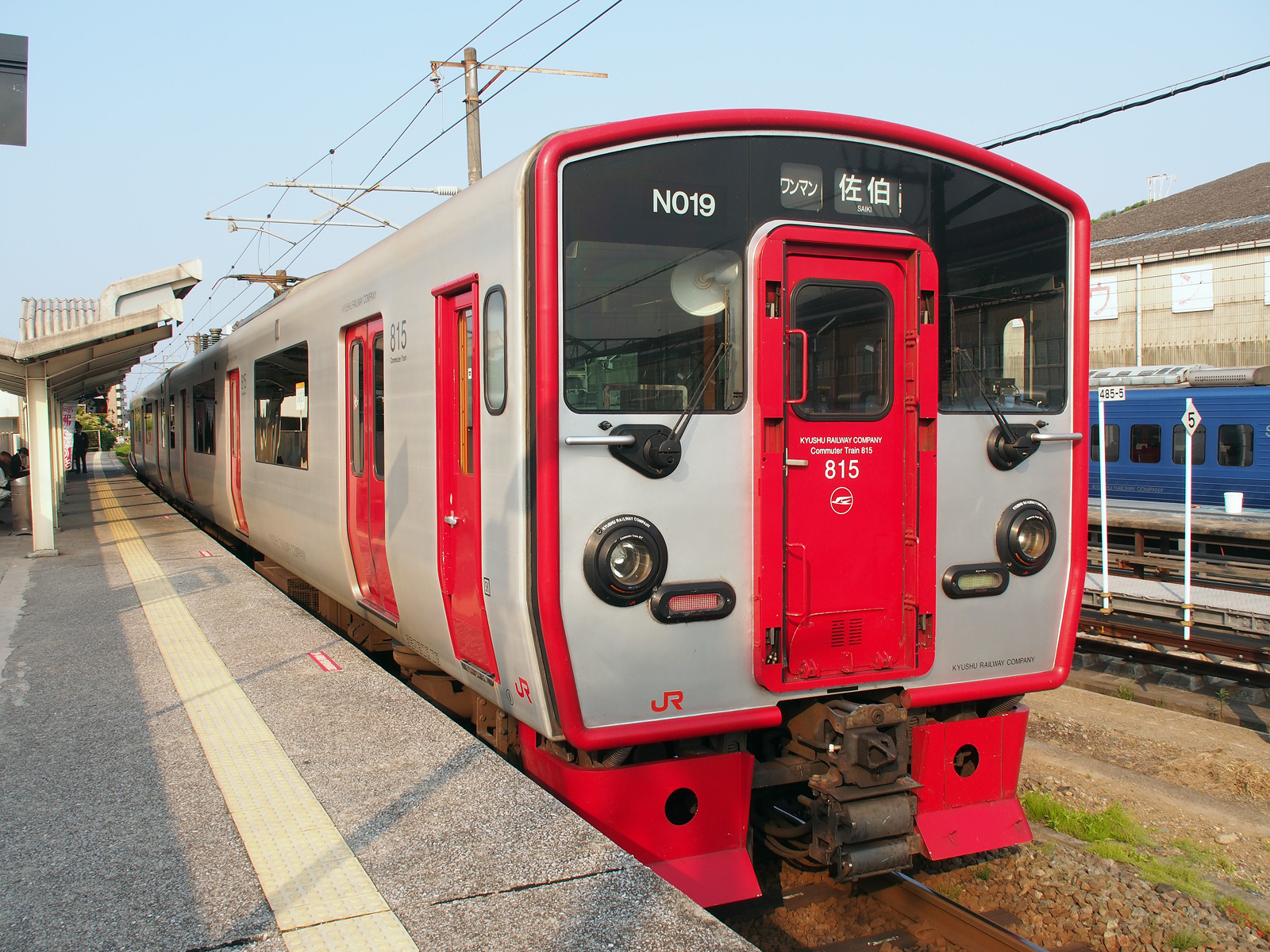
Platform

== History ==
Japanese National Railways (JNR) opened the station on 22 February 1987 as an additional station on the existing track of the Nippō Main Line. With the privatization of JNR on 1 April 1987, the station came under the control of JR Kyushu.

On 17 March 2018, Maki became a "Smart Support Station". Under this scheme, although the station became unstaffed, passengers can receive assistance via intercom from staff at a central support centre.

== Passenger statistics ==
In fiscal 2016, the station was used by an average of 752 passengers daily (boarding passengers only), and it ranked 196th among the busiest stations of JR Kyushu.

== Surrounding area ==
- Oita Prefectural Buried Cultural Properties Center (formerly Oita Prefectural Art Center) - 6 minutes walk .
- Peace Citizens Park (formerly known as Urakawa Park)

== See also ==
- List of railway stations in Japan
