= National Research Institute of Police Science =

Coordinates: 35°53′46.9″N 139°56′37.8″E

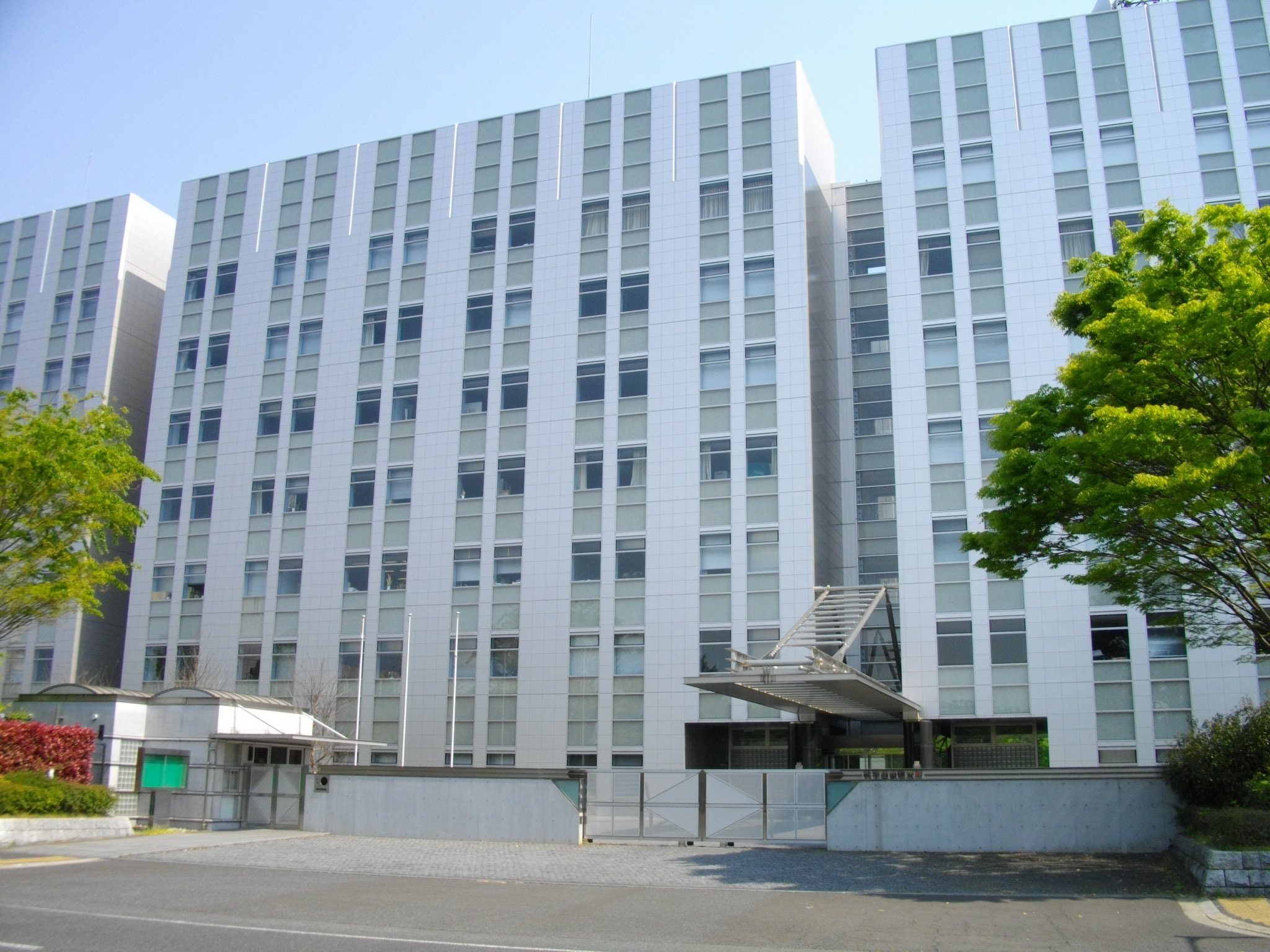
National Research Institute of Police Science (Japan)

The National Research Institute of Police Science (NRIPS) is an attached organization of the National Police Agency of Japan.

Its role includes: research and development, identification and analysis, and training.

== Address ==
- 6-3-1, Kashiwanoha, Kashiwa, Chiba Prefecture, Japan

== Organization ==
- President (Technical officer)
- Vice President (Technical officer)
- Department of General Affairs- General Affairs Section, Accounting Section
- First Department of Forensic Science - First Biology Section, Second Biology Section, Third Biology Section, Fourth Biology Section, Fifth Biology Section
- Second Department of Forensic Science - Physics Section, Fire Investigation Section, Explosion Investigation Section, Mechanical Section
- Third Department of Forensic Science - First Chemistry Section, Second Chemistry Section, Third Chemistry Section, Fourth Chemistry Section, Fifth Chemistry Section
- Fourth Department of Forensic Science - First Information Science Section, Second Information Section, Third Information Section
- Department of Criminology and Behavioral Science - Juvenile Section, Crime Prevention Section, Investigation Support Section
- Department of Traffic Science - First Traffic Science Section, Second Traffic Science Section, Third Traffic Science Section
- Research Coordinator
- Identification Center
- Training Center of Forensic Science
