= Ōzai Station =

Railway station in Ōita, Ōita Prefecture, Japan

Ōzai Station 大在駅
- Ōzai Station in 2026

General information
- Location: 1456 Madokoro, Ōita-shi, Ōita-ken, 870-0268; Japan
- Coordinates: 33°14′39″N 131°43′13″E
- Operator: JR Kyushu
- Line: ■ Nippō Main Line
- Distance: 144.3 km from Kokura
- Platforms: 1 side + 1 island platforms
- Tracks: 3

Construction
- Structure type: At grade
- Parking: Available
- Cycle facilities: Bike shed
- Accessible: No - island platform accessed by footbridge

Other information
- Status: Unstaffed station Smart support station introduction station.
- Website: Official website

History
- Opened: 25 November 1924
- Rebuilt: 2005

Passengers
- FY2016: 2,061 daily
- Rank: 89th (among JR Kyushu stations)

Services
Preceding station	JR Kyushu	Following station
Sakanoichi towards Kagoshima	Nippō Main Line	Tsurusaki towards Kokura
Location
- Location within Oita Prefecture Location within Japan

Ōzai Station (大在駅, Ōzai-eki) is a passenger railway station located in Ōita City, Ōita Prefecture, Japan. It is operated by JR Kyushu. The station serves Ōzai, a village that has now been merged into Ōita City and is typically busy with commuter traffic. It is also the nearest station to the Nippon Bunri University located at the nearby Ōita suburb of Sakanoichi.

== Lines ==
The station is served by the Nippō Main Line and is located 144.3 km from the starting point of the line at Kokura. The station is served by all local trains and by one Sonic express in each direction daily.

== Layout ==
The station consists of a side platform and an island platform serving three tracks at grade. The station building is a modern concrete structure with a distinctive saw-tooth roof. It houses a waiting area, SUGOCA card readers and a staffed ticket window. Access to the island platform is by means of a footbridge. Bike sheds and parking are available at the station forecourt. Next to the station building is another footbridge which links the streets on both sides of the tracks.

Although it is an unstaffed station, automatic ticket vending machines are installed.

=== Platforms ===
1, 2	■ ■ Nippō Main Line	for Saiki and Nobeoka for Ōita and Kokura
3	■ ■ Nippō Main Line	for Ōita and Kokura (special trains and first departures)

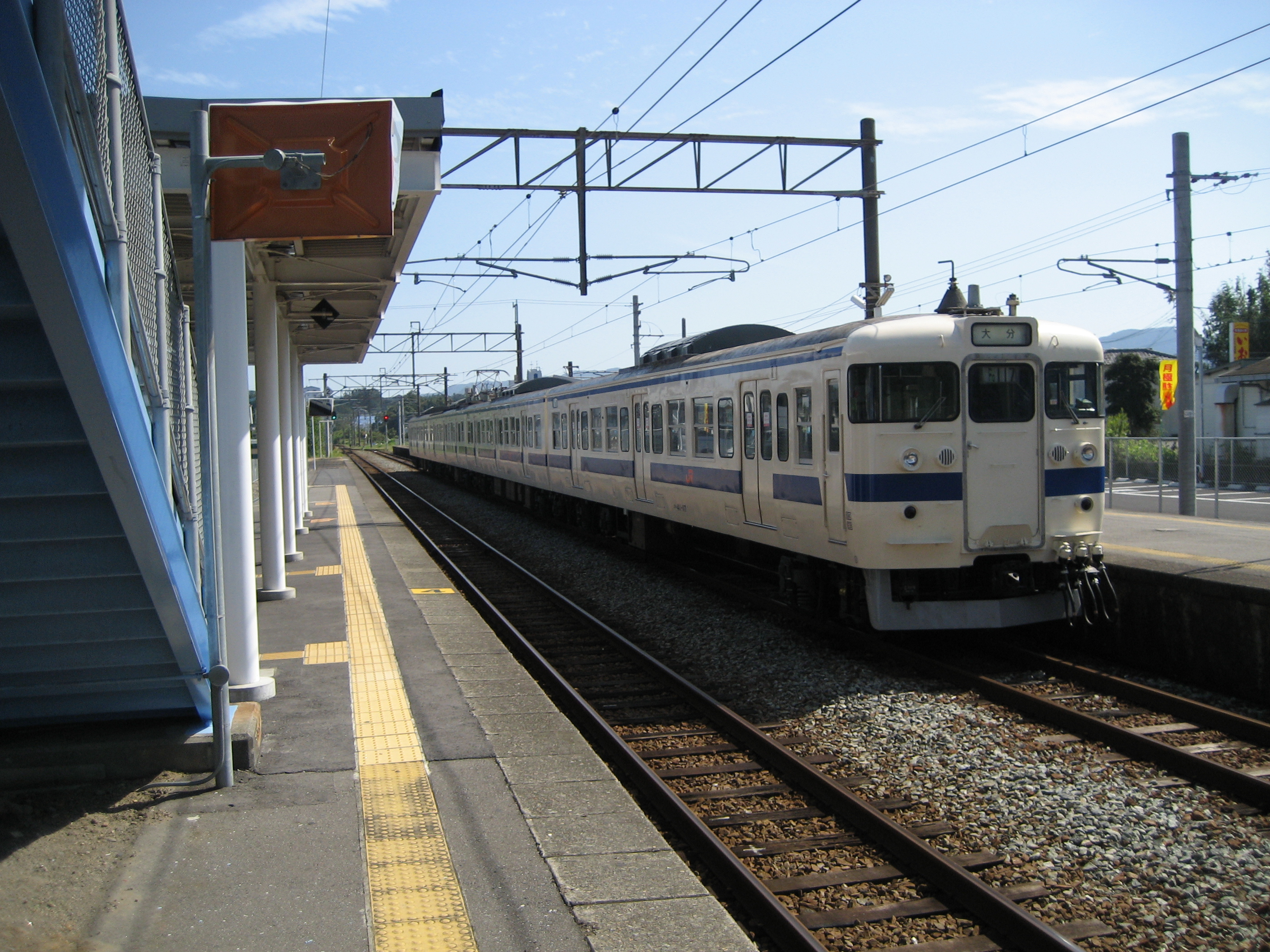
A view of the station platforms and tracks.

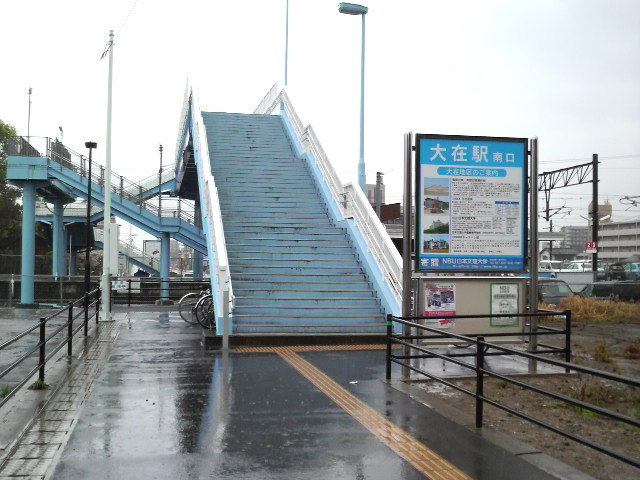
The sign says "Ōzai Station South Entrance". This footbridge leads to the forecourt next to the station building on the other side of the tracks.

== History ==
Japanese Government Railways (JGR) opened the station on 25 November 1924 as an additional station on the existing track of its Nippō Main Line. With the privatization of Japanese National Railways (JNR), the successor of JGR, on 1 April 1987, the station came under the control of JR Kyushu.

JR Kyushu had planned to convert Ōzai (with several other stations in Ōita City) into an unstaffed, remotely-managed "Smart Support Station" by 17 March 2018. After opposition from users, this move was postponed, pending works to improve accessibility. It was then introduced on July 1, 2023.

== Passenger statistics ==
In fiscal 2016, the station was used by an average of 2,061 passengers daily (boarding passengers only), and it ranked 89th among the busiest stations of JR Kyushu.

In fiscal 2021, the station saw an average of 1,789 passengers daily, and was said to be one of the busiest stations of Kyushu Railway Co.'s railway network.

== Surrounding area ==
- Nippon Bunri University

== See also ==
- List of railway stations in Japan
