= Tsurusaki Station =

Railway station in Ōita, Ōita Prefecture, Japan

Tsurusaki Station 鶴崎駅
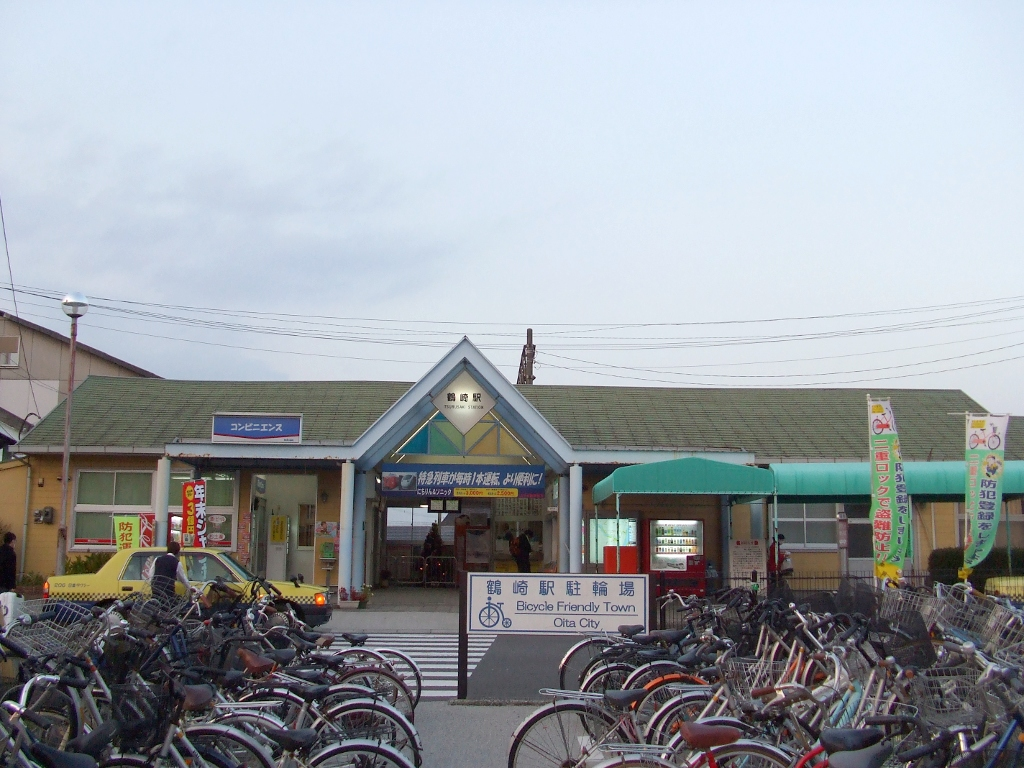
- Tsurusaki Station in 2008

General information
- Location: 2710-4 Tsurusaki, Ōita-shi, Ōita-ken, 870-0106; Japan
- Coordinates: 33°14′33″N 131°41′15″E
- Operator: JR Kyushu; JR Freight
- Line: ■ Nippō Main Line
- Distance: 141.0 km from Kokura
- Platforms: 1 island platform
- Tracks: 2 + several siding (disused)

Construction
- Structure type: At grade
- Cycle facilities: Designated parking area for bicycles
- Accessible: No - platform accessed by footbridge

Other information
- Status: Staffed ticket window (Midori no Madoguchi) (outsourced)
- Website: Official website

History
- Opened: 1 April 1914

Passengers
- FY2016: 2,006 daily
- Rank: 91st (among JR Kyushu stations)

Services
Preceding station	JR Kyushu	Following station
Takajō towards Kagoshima	Nippō Main Line	Ōzai towards Kokura
Location
- Location within Oita Prefecture Location within Japan

Tsurusaki Station (鶴崎駅, Tsurusaki-eki) is a passenger railway station located in Ōita City, Ōita Prefecture, Japan. It is operated by JR Kyushu. It is also a freight depot operated by the Japan Freight Railway Company (JR Freight)

== Lines ==
The station is served by the Nippō Main Line and is located 141.0 km from the starting point of the line at Kokura.

== Layout ==
The station consists of an island platform serving two tracks at grade. The station building is a wooden structure in western style. It houses an enclosed waiting room, a shop, automatic ticket vending machines and a staffed ticket window. Access to the island platform is by means of a footbridge.

Management of the passenger facilities at the station has been outsourced to the JR Kyushu Tetsudou Eigyou Co., a wholly owned subsidiary of JR Kyushu specialising in station services. It staffs the ticket window which is equipped with a Midori no Madoguchi facility.

=== Platforms ===
3	■ ■ Nippō Main Line	for Ōita and Kokura
4	■ ■ Nippō Main Line	for Saiki, Nobeoka and Miyazaki

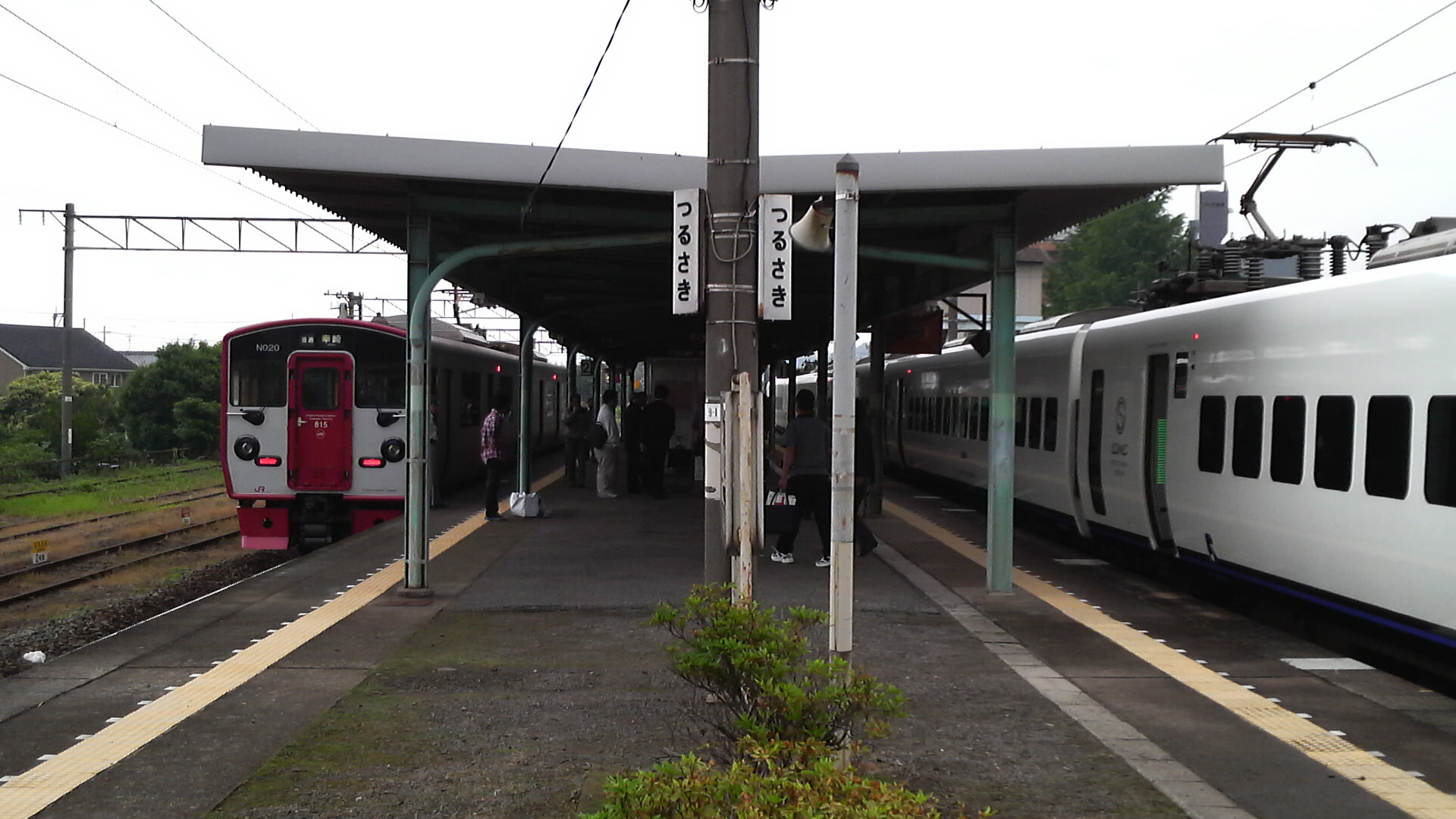
View of the platform and tracks. Note the many sidings to the left.

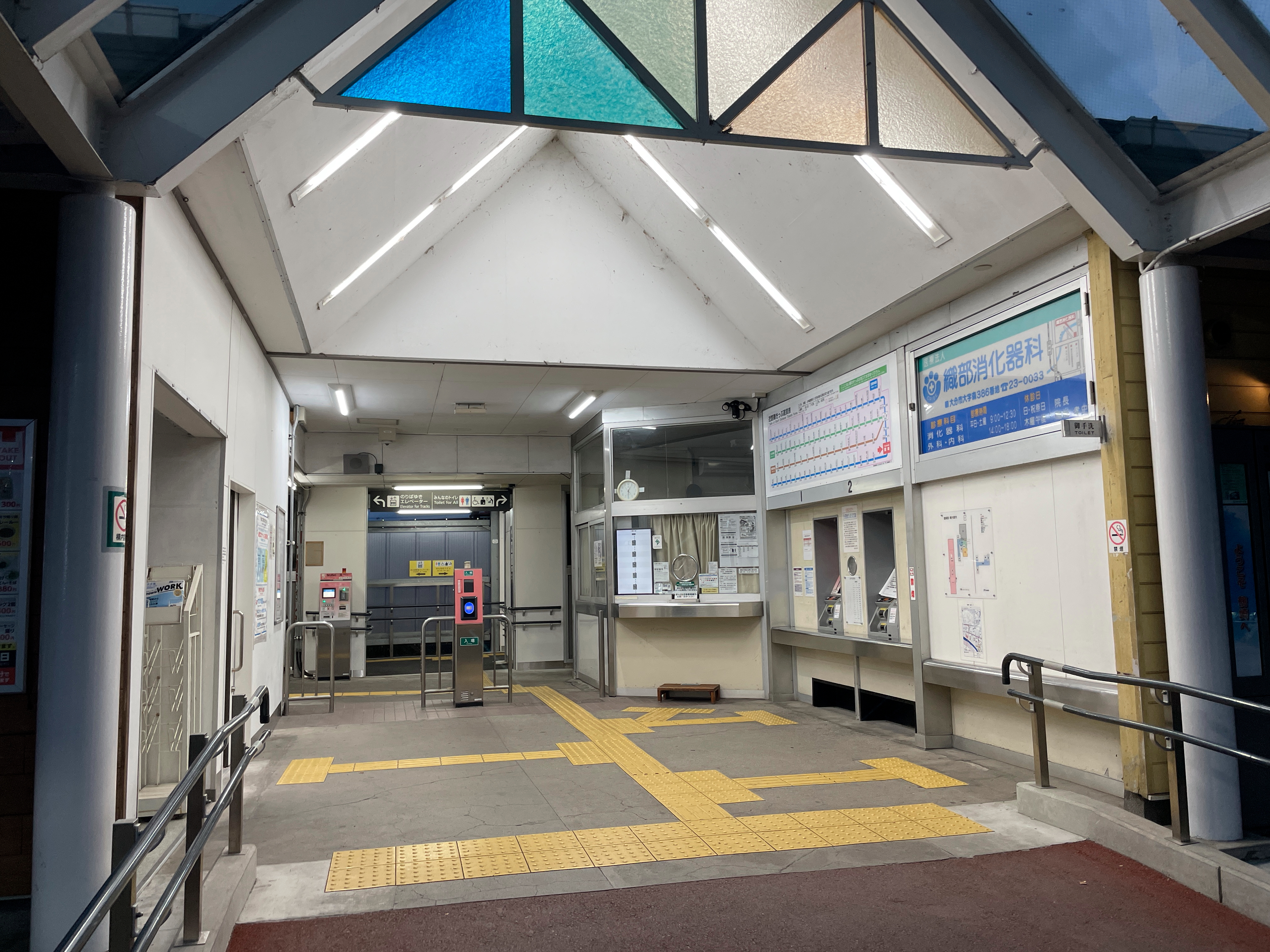
Ticket Gate

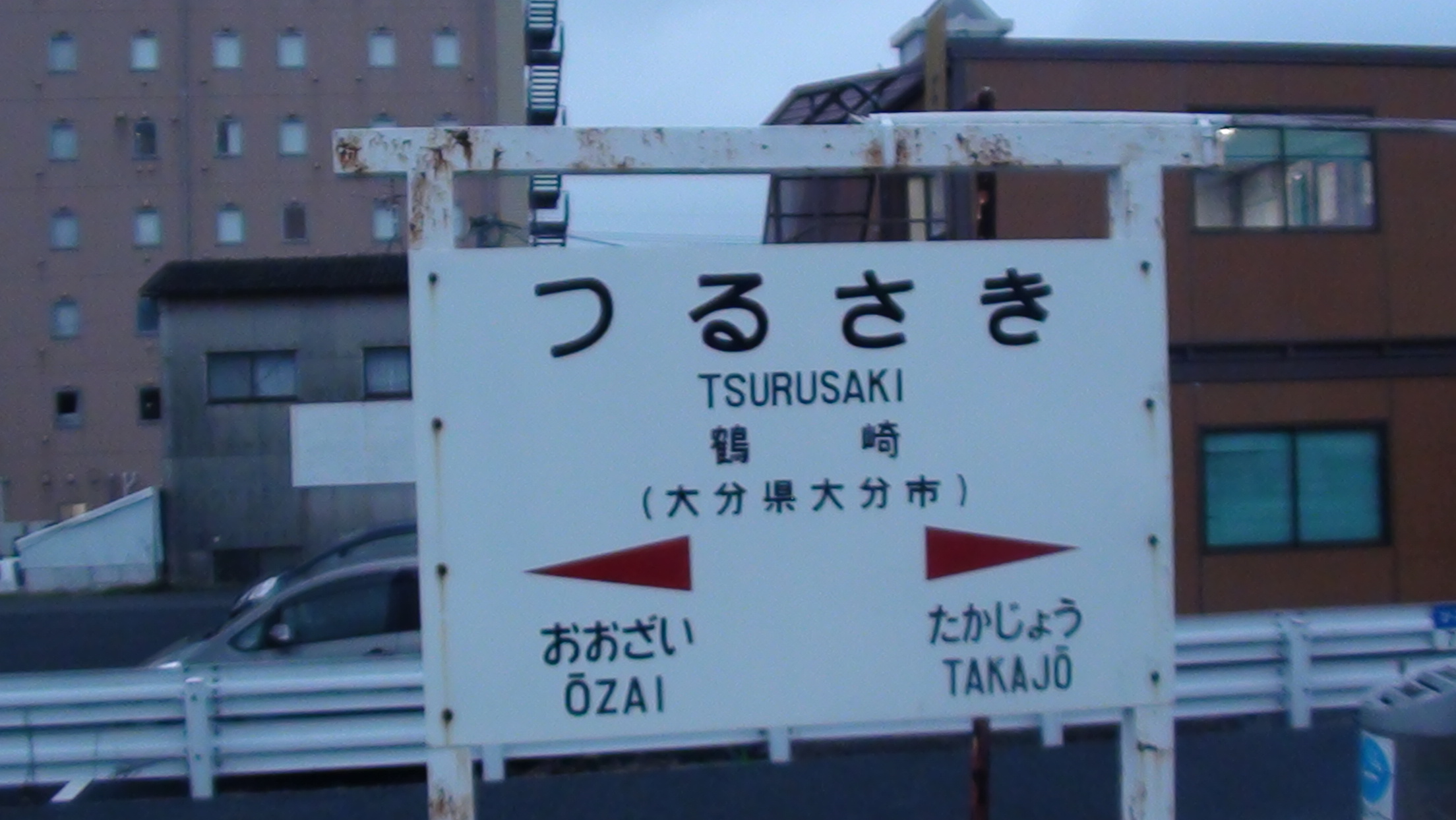
Signboard

== Adjacent stations ==
«	Service	»
Nippō Main Line
Takajō	Local	Ōzai
JR Kyushu Limited Express
Ōita	Sonic	Ōzai
Ōita	Nichirin	Kōzaki

== History ==
The private Kyushu Railway had, by 1909, through acquisition and its own expansion, established a track from Kokura to Yanagigaura. The Kyushu Railway was nationalised on 1 July 1907. Japanese Government Railways (JGR), designated the track as the Hōshū Main Line on 12 October 1909 and expanded it southwards in phases. On 1 April 1914, Kōzaki was opened as the new southern terminus after the track had been extended south from Ōita. On the same day, Tsurusaki was opened as an intermediate station on the new track. On 15 December 1923, the Hōshū Main Line was renamed the Nippō Main Line. With the privatization of Japanese National Railways (JNR), the successor of JGR, on 1 April 1987, the station came under the control of JR Kyushu.

JR Kyushu had planned to convert Tsurusaki (with several other stations in Ōita City) into an unstaffed, remotely-managed "Smart Support Station" by 17 March 2018 but after opposition from users, this was postponed, pending works to improve accessibility. It was then introduced on 1 July 2023.

== Passenger statistics ==
In fiscal 2016, the station was used by an average of 2,006 passengers daily (boarding passengers only), and it ranked 91st among the busiest stations of JR Kyushu.

== Surrounding area ==
- Tsurusaki Citizen Administration Center (Oita City Hall Tsurusaki Branch)
- Oita Port Joint Government Building
- Oita Prefectural Oita Tsurusaki High School
- Oita Prefectural Tsurusaki Technical High School
- Japan National Route 197

== See also ==
- List of railway stations in Japan
