= Sakanoichi Station =

Railway station in Ōita, Ōita Prefecture, Japan

Sakanoichi Station 坂ノ市駅
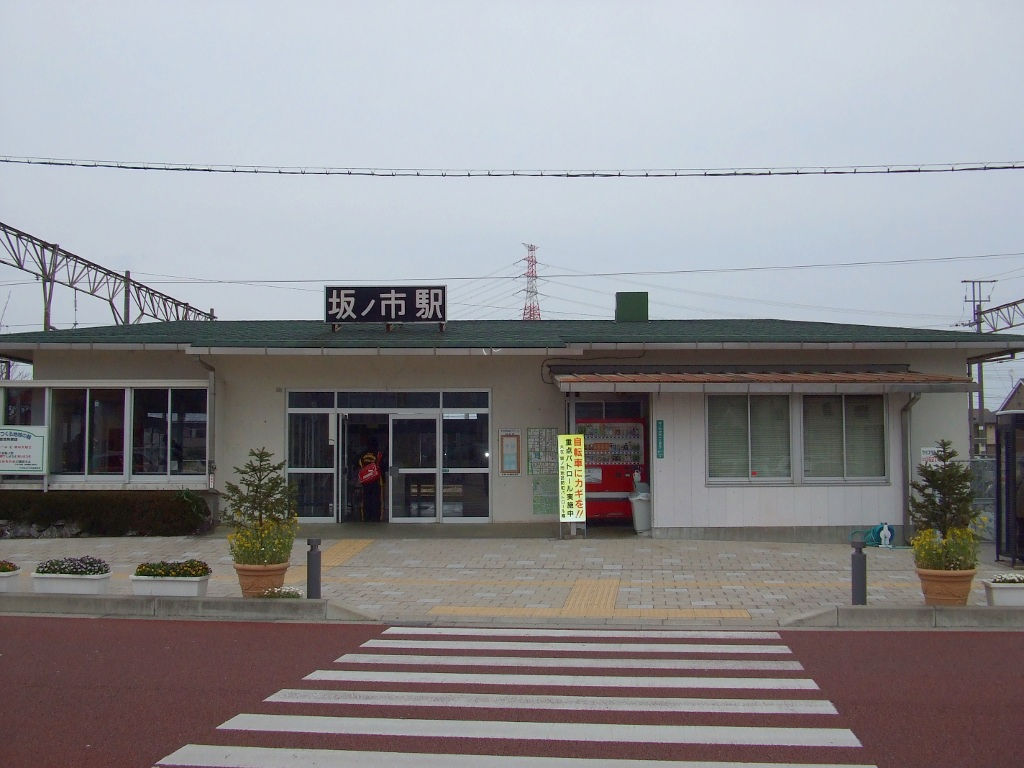
- Sakanoichi Station in 2009

General information
- Location: 1-chōme-9 Sakanoichichūō, Ōita-shi, Ōita-ken, 870-0307; Japan
- Coordinates: 33°14′12″N 131°45′07″E
- Operator: JR Kyushu
- Line: ■ Nippō Main Line
- Distance: 147.4 km from Kokura
- Platforms: 1 island platform
- Tracks: 2 + 1 siding

Construction
- Structure type: At grade
- Parking: Available
- Cycle facilities: Designated parking area for bikes
- Accessible: No - island platform accessed by footbridge

Other information
- Status: unstaffed station Smart support station introduction station.
- Website: Official website

History
- Opened: 1 April 1914

Passengers
- FY2016: 1,165 daily
- Rank: 147th (among JR Kyushu stations)

Services
| Preceding station | JR Kyushu | Following station |
|---|---|---|
| Kōzaki towards Kagoshima | Nippō Main Line | Ōzai towards Kokura |
Location
- Location within Oita Prefecture Location within Japan

Sakanoichi Station (坂ノ市駅, Sakanoichi-eki) is a passenger railway station located in Ōita City, Ōita Prefecture, Japan. It is operated by JR Kyushu. The station serves the Ōita suburb of Sakanoichi.

== Lines ==
The station is served by the Nippō Main Line and is located 147.4 km from the starting point of the line at Kokura.

== Layout ==
The station consists of an island platform serving two tracks at grade with a siding. The station building is a modern steel frame structure with a flat roof. It houses a waiting area, SUGOCA card readers, automatic ticket vending machines and a staffed ticket window. Access to the island platform is by means of a footbridge. Bike sheds and parking are available at the station forecourt.

Although it is an unstaffed station, automatic ticket vending machines are installed.

=== Platforms ===
| 1 | ■ ■ Nippō Main Line | for Ōita and Beppu |
| 2 | ■ ■ Nippō Main Line | for Saiki and Nobeoka |

== History ==
The private Kyushu Railway had, by 1909, through acquisition and its own expansion, established a track from Kokura to Yanagigaura. The Kyushu Railway was nationalised on 1 July 1907. Japanese Government Railways (JGR), designated the track as the Hōshū Main Line on 12 October 1909 and expanded it southwards in phases. On 1 April 1914, Kōzaki was opened as the new southern terminus after the track had been extended south from Ōita. On the same day, Sakanoichi was opened as an intermediate station on the new track. On 15 December 1923, the Hōshū Main Line was renamed the Nippō Main Line. With the privatization of Japanese National Railways (JNR), the successor of JGR, on 1 April 1987, the station came under the control of JR Kyushu.

JR Kyushu had planned to convert Sakanoichi (with several other stations in Ōita City) into an unstaffed, remotely-managed "Smart Support Station" by 17 March 2018 but after opposition from users, this was postponed, pending works to improve accessibility. It was then introduced on July 1, 2023.

== Passenger statistics ==
In fiscal 2016, the station was used by an average of 1,165 passengers daily (boarding passengers only), and it ranked 147th among the busiest stations of JR Kyushu.

== Surrounding area ==
- Oita City Sakano Branch Office (former Sakano City Town Hall)
- Manko-ji (Founded by Emperor Yomei around the 7th century. The Mankoji Market, one of the three major markets in Oita Prefecture)
- Oita Prefectural Oita Higashi High School
- Kamezuka Kofun - The largest kofun in the prefecture and a nationally designated historic site.
- Japan National Route 197

== See also ==
- List of railway stations in Japan
