= Takajō Station =

Railway station in Ōita, Ōita Prefecture, Japan

Takajō Station 高城駅
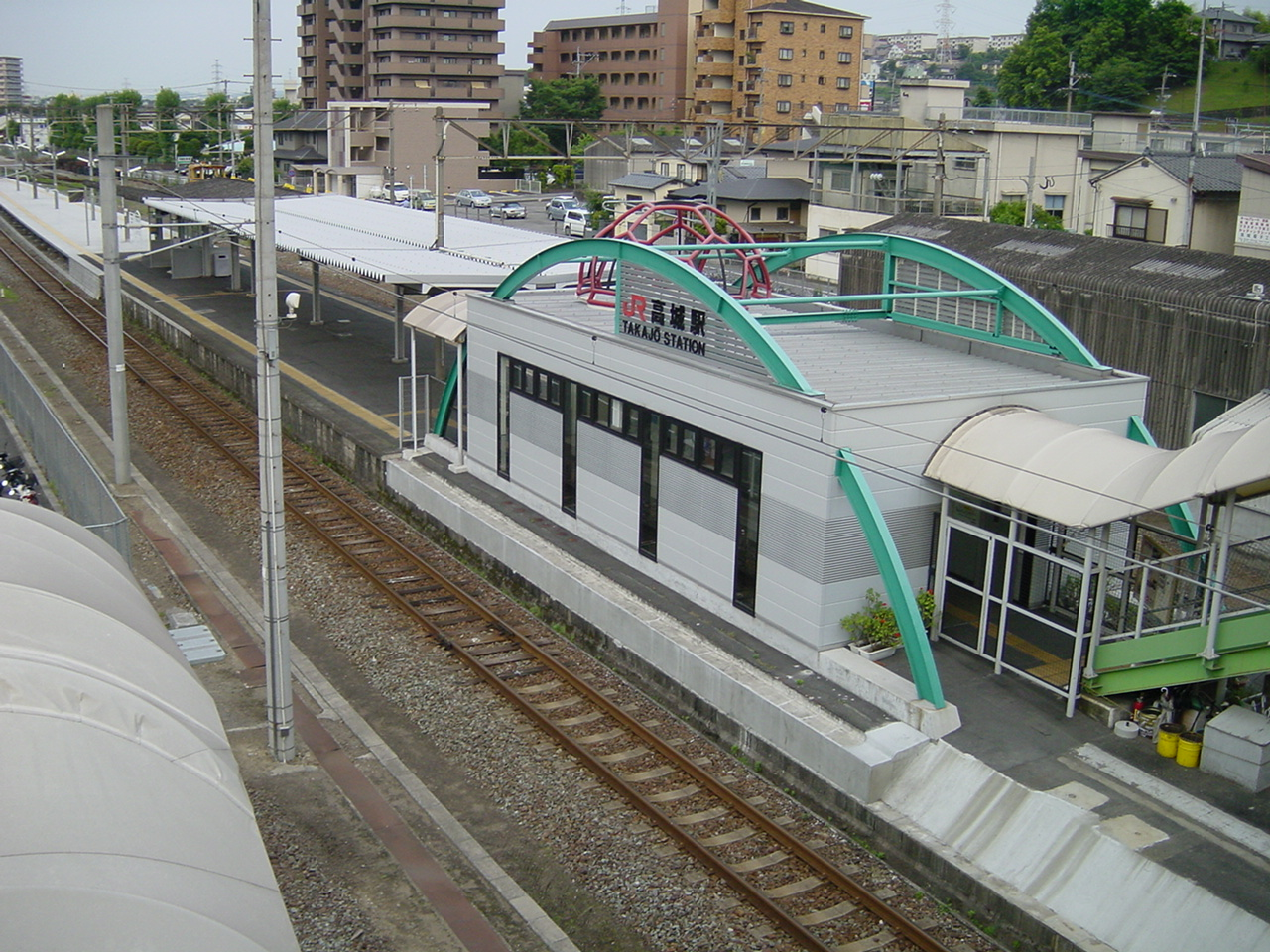
- Takajō Station in 2006

General information
- Location: 14 Takajōshinmachi, Ōita-shi, Ōita-ken, 870-0156; Japan
- Coordinates: 33°14′34″N 131°39′19″E
- Operator: JR Kyushu
- Line: ■ Nippō Main Line
- Distance: 138.0 km from Kokura
- Platforms: 1 island platform
- Tracks: 2 + 1 siding

Construction
- Structure type: At grade
- Accessible: No - platform accessed by footbridge

Other information
- Status: Unstaffed station Smart support station introduction station.
- Website: Official website

History
- Opened: 1 April 1914

Passengers
- FY2016: 1,800 daily
- Rank: 102nd (among JR Kyushu stations)

Services
Preceding station	JR Kyushu	Following station
Tsurusaki towards Kagoshima	Nippō Main Line	Maki towards Kokura
Location
- Location within Oita Prefecture Location within Japan

Takajō Station (高城駅, Takajō-eki) is a passenger railway station located in Ōita City, Ōita Prefecture, Japan. It is operated by JR Kyushu.

== Lines ==
The station is served by the Nippō Main Line and is located 138.0 km from the starting point of the line at Kokura.

== Layout ==
The station consists of an island platform serving two tracks at grade. The station building is a small modern concrete structure located on the island platform and is accessed by a footbridge which also serves as a free passage, linking streets on both sides of the track. A staffed ticket window is located inside the station building.

The station is unstaffed, but there is an automatic ticket vending machine.

=== Platforms ===
1	■ ■ Nippō Main Line	for Saiki
2	■ ■ Nippō Main Line	for Ōita and Beppu

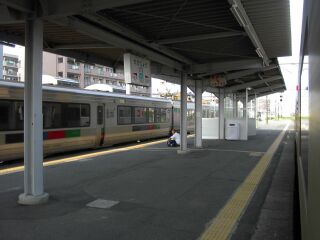
A view of the station platform.

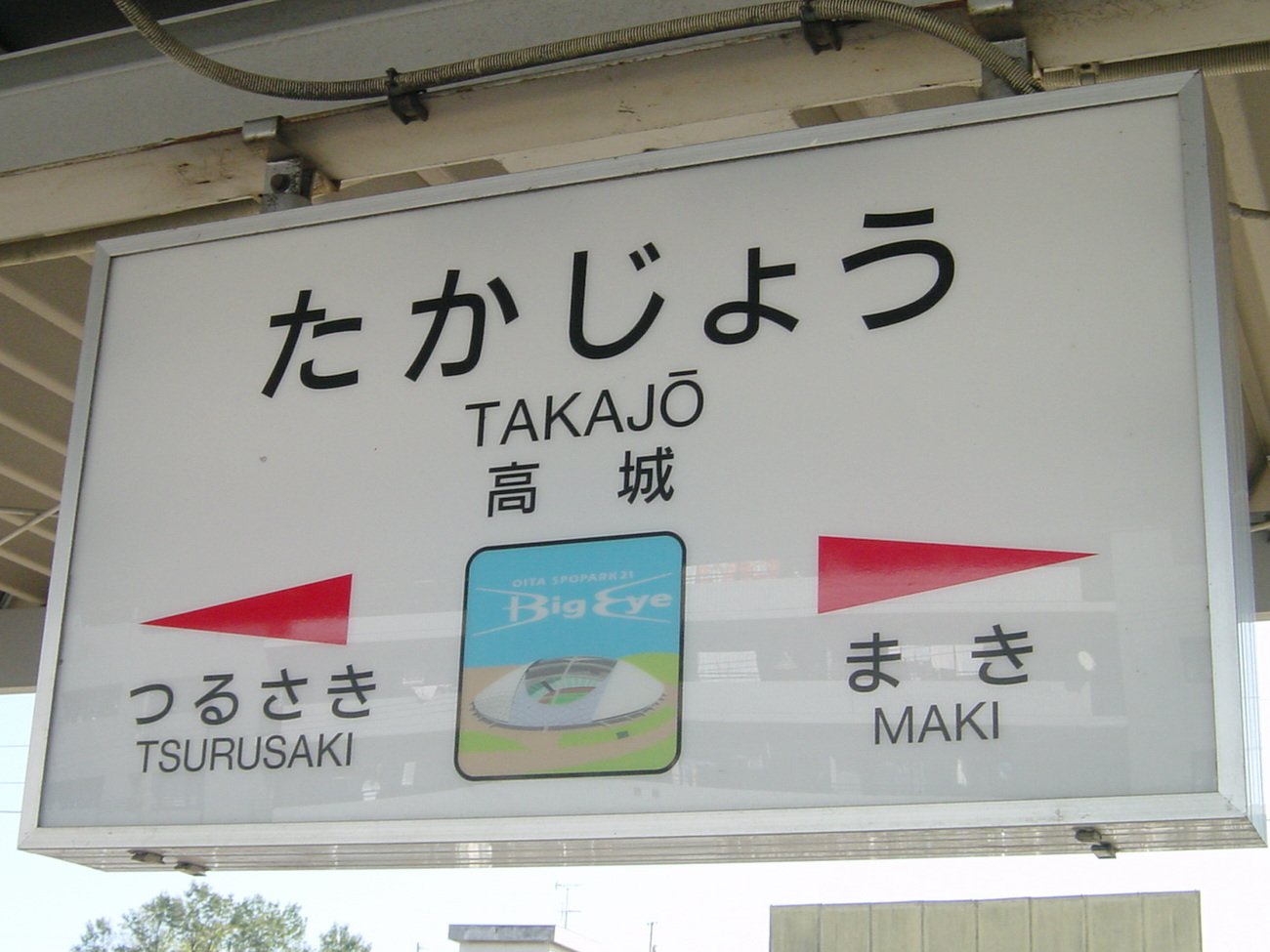
Station signboard

== History ==
The private Kyushu Railway had, by 1909, through acquisition and its own expansion, established a track from Kokura to Yanagigaura. The Kyushu Railway was nationalised on 1 July 1907. Japanese Government Railways (JGR), designated the track as the Hōshū Main Line on 12 October 1909 and expanded it southwards in phases. On 1 April 1914, Kōzaki was opened as the new southern terminus after the track had been extended south from Ōita. On the same day, Takajō was opened as an intermediate station on the new track. On 15 December 1923, the Hōshū Main Line was renamed the Nippō Main Line. With the privatization of Japanese National Railways (JNR), the successor of JGR, on 1 April 1987, the station came under the control of JR Kyushu.

JR Kyushu had planned to convert Takajō (with several other stations in Ōita City) into an unstaffed, remotely-managed "Smart Support Station" by 17 March 2018 but after opposition from users, this was postponed, pending works to improve accessibility. It was then introduced on 1 July 2023.

== Passenger statistics ==
In fiscal 2016, the station was used by an average of 1,800 passengers daily (boarding passengers only), and it ranked 102nd among the busiest stations of JR Kyushu.

== Surrounding area ==
- Resonac Dome Oita
- Oita City Hioka Elementary School
- Oita City Harakawa Junior High School

== See also ==
- List of railway stations in Japan
