= Kamioka Station =

Railway station in Saiki, Ōita Prefecture, Japan

Kamioka Station 上岡駅
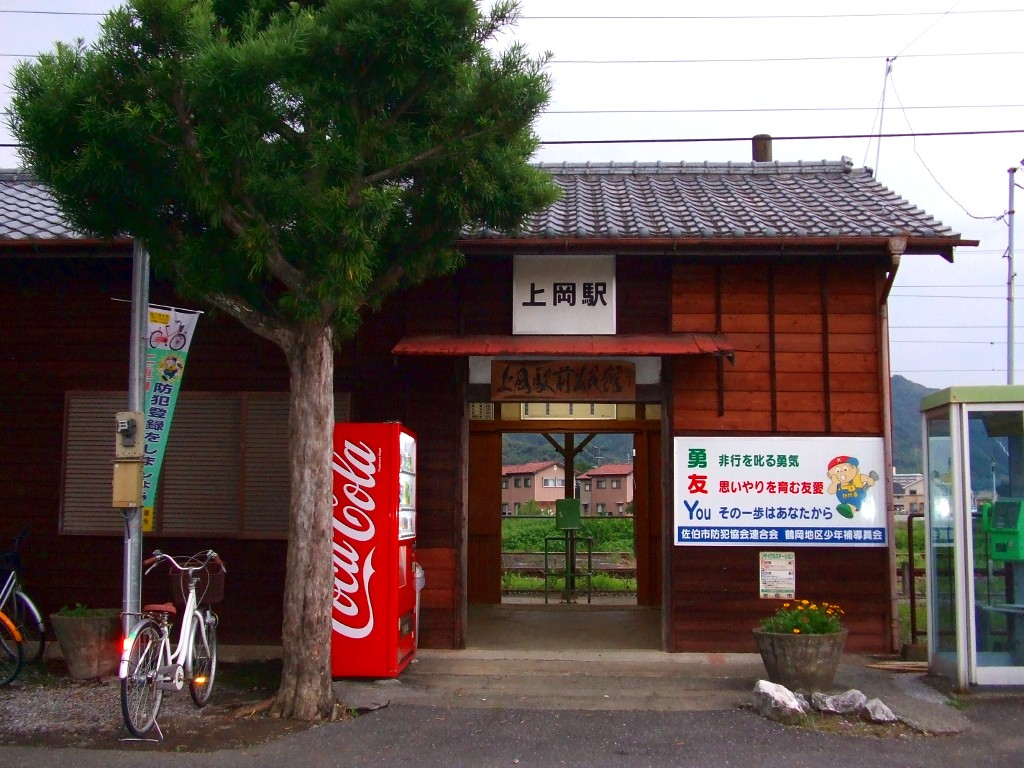
- Kamioka Station in 2009

General information
- Location: Kamioka, Saiki-shi, Ōita-ken 876-0045; Japan
- Coordinates: 32°57′23″N 131°51′44″E
- Operator: JR Kyushu
- Line: ■ Nippō Main Line
- Distance: 202.4 km from Kokura
- Platforms: 1 island platform
- Tracks: 2 + 1 siding

Construction
- Structure type: At grade
- Accessible: No - platform accessed by footbridge

Other information
- Status: Unstaffed
- Website: Official website

History
- Opened: 20 November 1920

Passengers
- FY2015: 13 daily

Services
| Preceding station | JR Kyushu | Following station |
|---|---|---|
| Naomi towards Kagoshima | Nippō Main Line | Saiki towards Kokura |
Location
- Location within Oita Prefecture Location within Japan

Kamioka Station (上岡駅, Kamioka-eki) is a passenger railway station located in the city of Saiki, Ōita, Japan. It is operated by JR Kyushu.

== Lines ==
The station is served by the Nippō Main Line and is located 202.4 km from the starting point of the line at Kokura.

== Layout ==
The station, which is unstaffed, consists of an island platform serving two tracks, with a siding. The station building is a simple wooden structure in Japanese style with a tiled roof which serves only to house a waiting area with seats and an automatic ticket vending machine. Access to the island platform is by means of a footbridge. A wooden shed is provided on the platform as a weather shelter.

=== Platforms ===
| 1 | ■ ■ Nippō Main Line | for Nobeoka |
| 2 | ■ ■ Nippō Main Line | for Saiki |

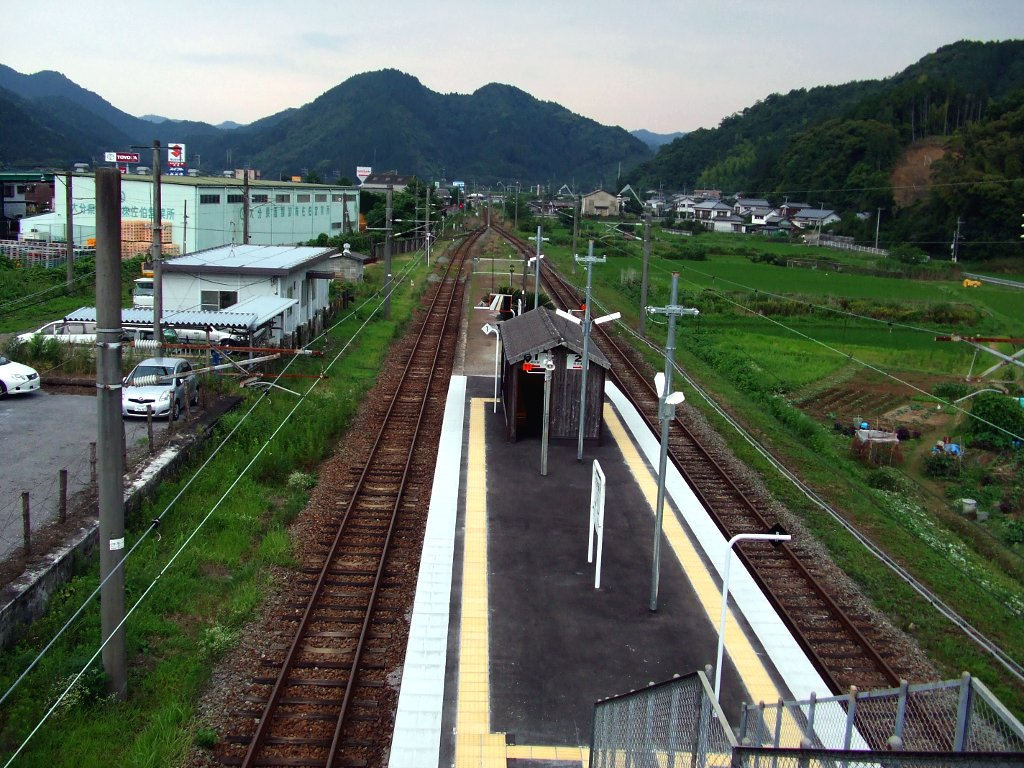
A view of the station platform looking south. The siding can be seen in the distance branching to the left.

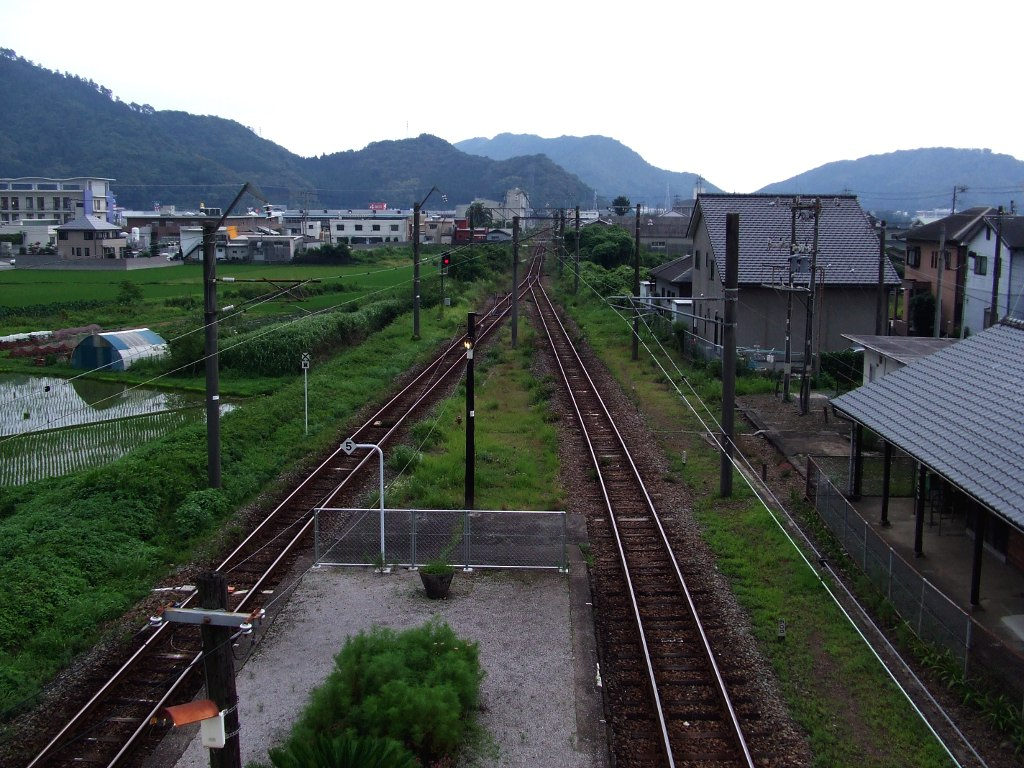
A view of the station platform looking north.

== History ==
The private Kyushu Railway had, by 1909, through acquisition and its own expansion, established a track from Kokura to Yanagigaura. The Kyushu Railway was nationalised on 1 July 1907. Japanese Government Railways (JGR), designated the track as the Hōshū Main Line on 12 October 1909 and expanded it southwards in phases, with Gōnohara (today Naokawa) opening as the new southern terminus on 20 November 1920. On the same day, Kamioka was opened as an intermediate station on the new track. On 15 December 1923, the Hōshū Main Line was renamed the Nippō Main Line. With the privatization of Japanese National Railways (JNR), the successor of JGR, on 1 April 1987, the station came under the control of JR Kyushu.

== Passenger statistics ==
In fiscal 2015, there were a total of 4,706 boarding passengers, giving a daily average of 13 passengers.

== Surrounding area ==
- Nishida Atsutoku Hospital
- Bansho River
- Japan National Route 217

== See also ==
- List of railway stations in Japan
