= Naomi Station =

Railway station in Saiki, Ōita Prefecture, Japan

Naomi Station 直見駅
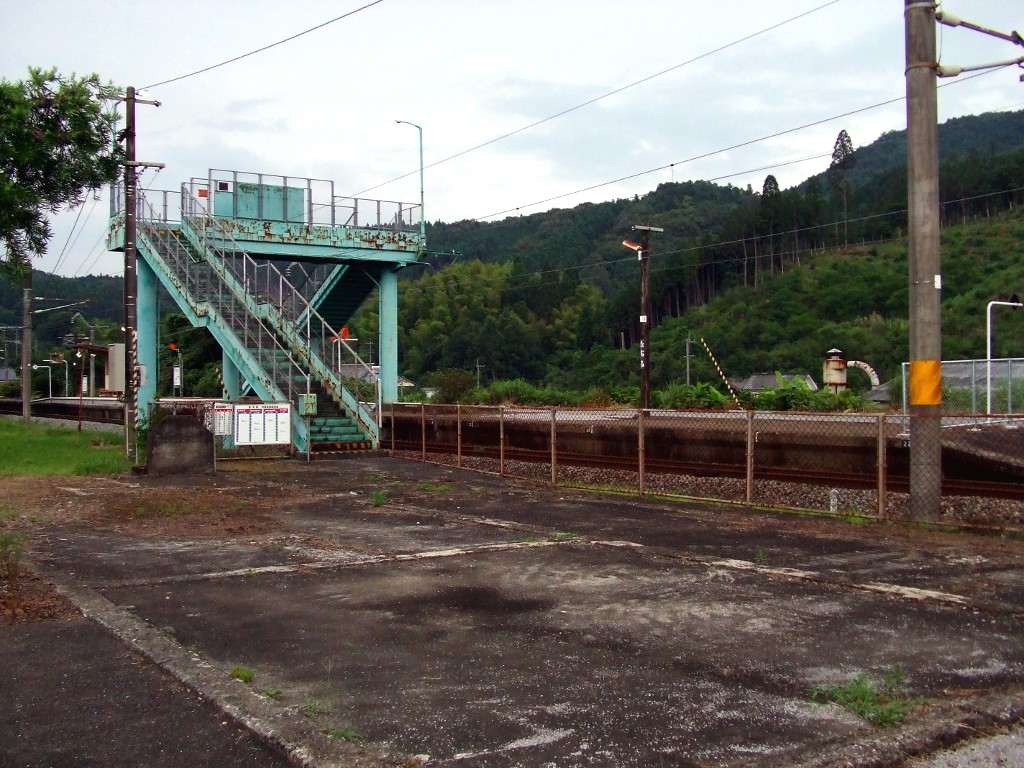
- Naomi Station in 2009

General information
- Location: Naokawa Oaza Shimonaomi, Saiki-shi, Ōita-ken 879-3103; Japan
- Coordinates: 32°55′42″N 131°48′28″E
- Operator: JR Kyushu
- Line: ■ Nippō Main Line
- Distance: 208.8 km from Kokura
- Platforms: 1 island platform
- Tracks: 2 + 1 siding

Construction
- Structure type: Low embankment
- Accessible: No - platform accessed by footbridge

Other information
- Status: Unstaffed
- Website: Official website

History
- Opened: 20 November 1920

Passengers
- FY2015: 4 daily

Services
Preceding station	JR Kyushu	Following station
Naokawa towards Kagoshima	Nippō Main Line	Kamioka towards Kokura
Location
- Location within Oita Prefecture Location within Japan

Naomi Station (直見駅, Naomi-eki) is a passenger railway station located in the city of Saiki, Ōita, Japan. It is operated by JR Kyushu.

== Lines ==
The station is served by the Nippō Main Line and is located 208.8 km from the starting point of the line at Kokura.

== Layout ==
The station, which is unstaffed, consists of an island platform serving two tracks, with a siding. There is no station building. A short flight of steps leads up from the access road to a small forecourt from where a footbridge gives access to the island platform which has a shelter for waiting passengers.

=== Platforms ===
1	■ ■ Nippō Main Line	for Saiki
2	■ ■ Nippō Main Line	for Nobeoka

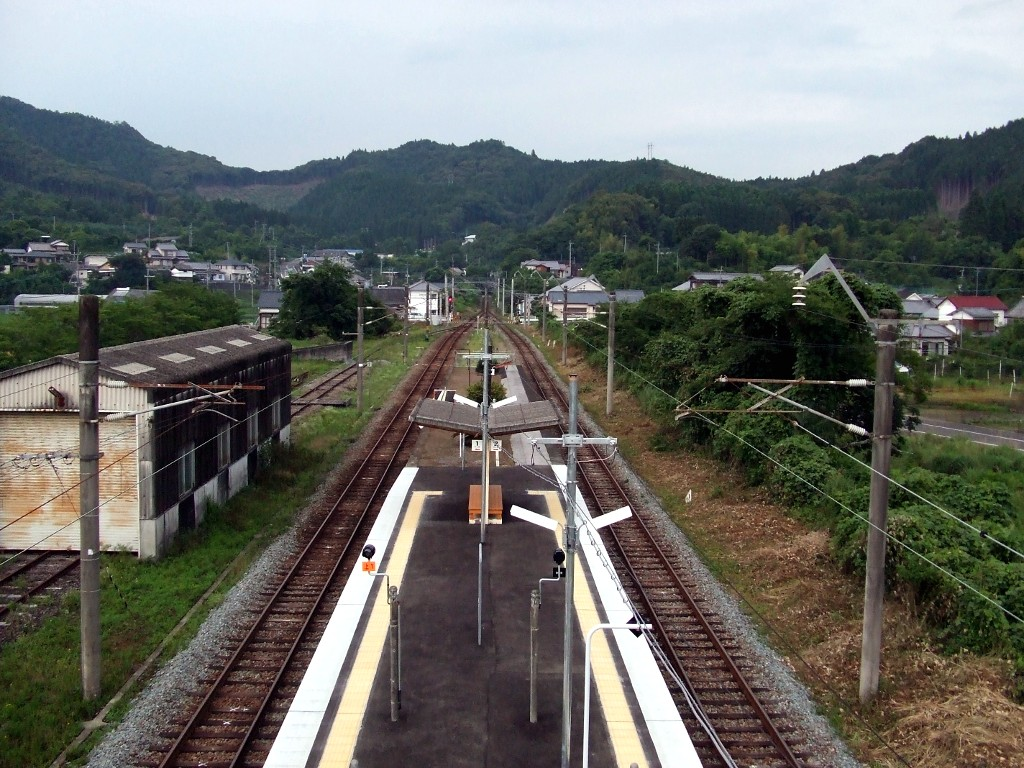
A view of the station platform looking north. The siding can be seen branching to the left.

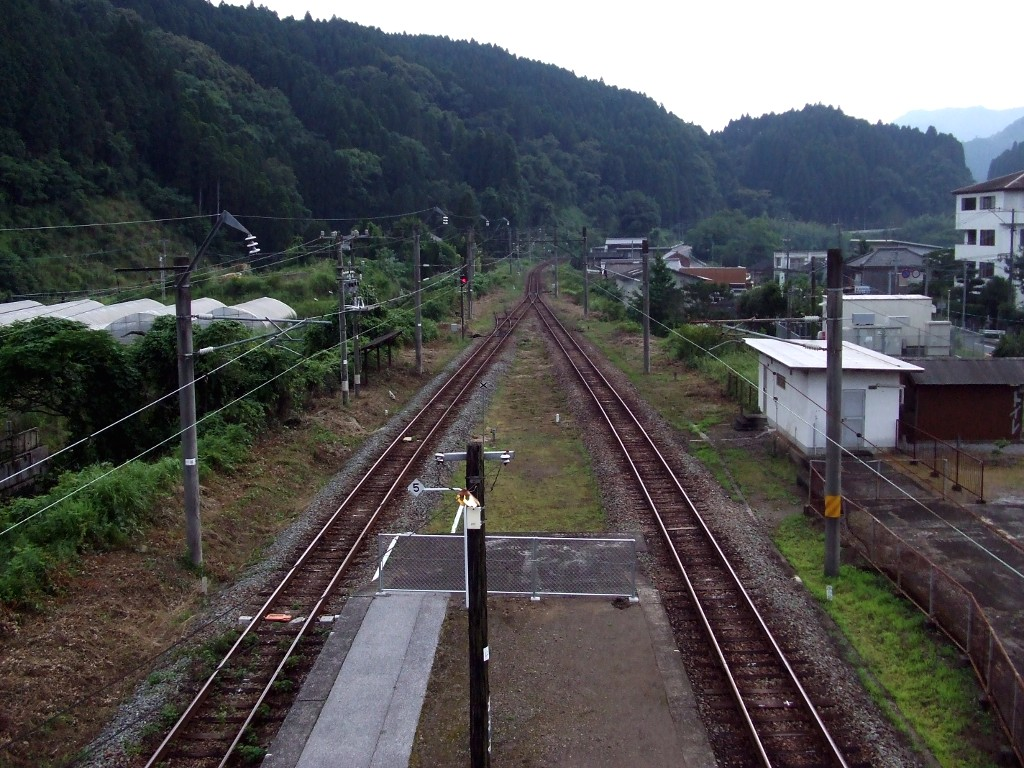
A view of the station platform looking south.

== History ==
The private Kyushu Railway had, by 1909, through acquisition and its own expansion, established a track from Kokura to Yanagigaura. The Kyushu Railway was nationalised on 1 July 1907. Japanese Government Railways (JGR), designated the track as the Hōshū Main Line on 12 October 1909 and expanded it southwards in phases, with Gōnohara (today Naokawa) opening as the new southern terminus on 20 November 1920. On the same day, Naomi was opened as an intermediate station on the new track. On 15 December 1923, the Hōshū Main Line was renamed the Nippō Main Line. With the privatization of Japanese National Railways (JNR), the successor of JGR, on 1 April 1987, the station came under the control of JR Kyushu.

== Passenger statistics ==
In fiscal 2015, there were a total of 1,628 boarding passengers, giving a daily average of 4 passengers.

== Surrounding area ==
- Japan National Route 10

== See also ==
- List of railway stations in Japan
