= Saiki Domain =

Administrative division in Japan during the Edo period (1600–1871)

Saiki Domain 佐伯藩
- Domain of Japan
- 1600–1871
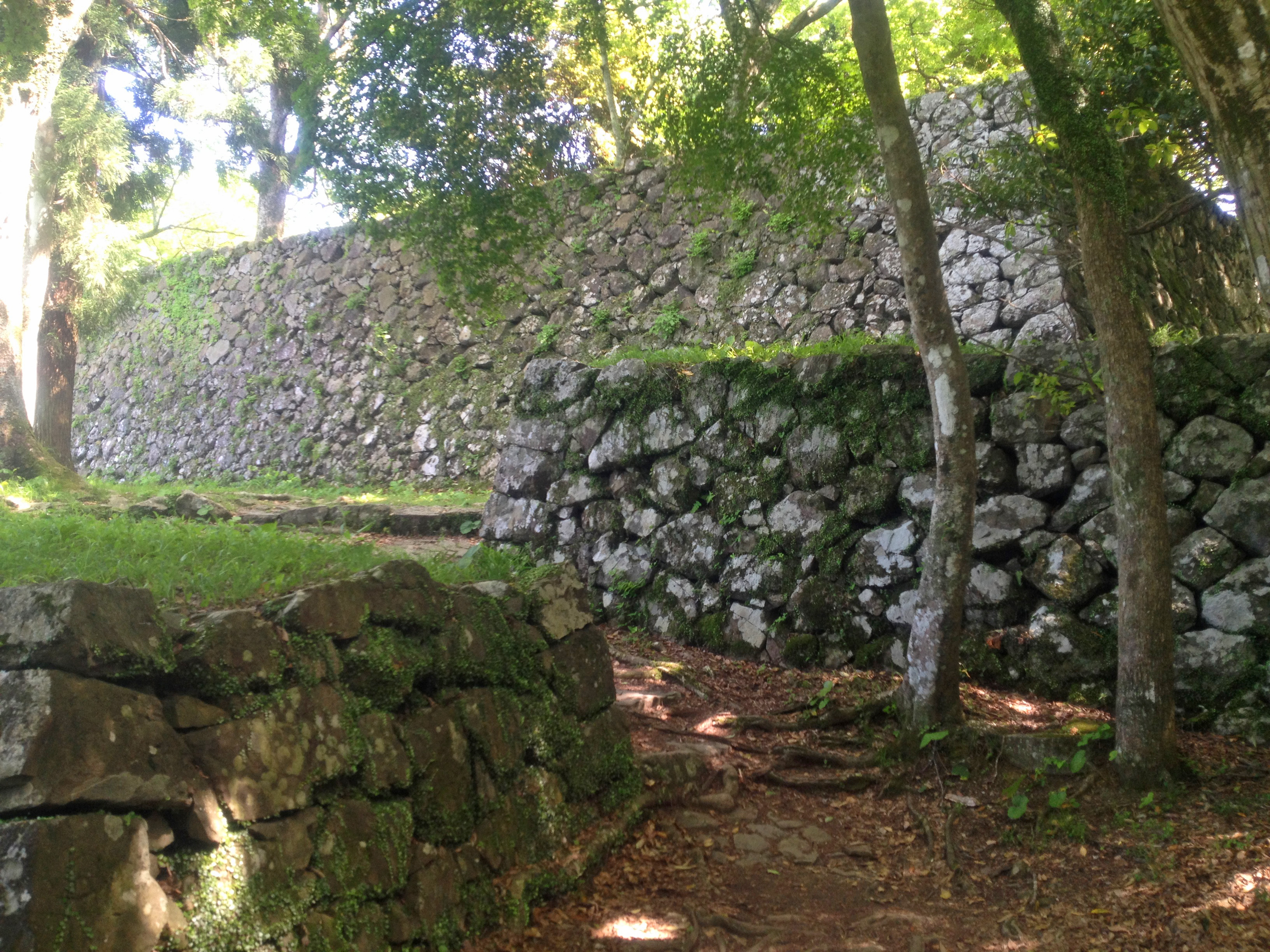
- Saiki Castle

- Mon of the Mōri clan
- Capital: Saiki Castle
- Area
  - Coordinates: 32°57′36.83″N 131°53′23.35″E
- Historical era: Edo period
  - Established: 1600
  - Abolition of the han system: 1871
- Contained within
  - Province: Bungo Province
- Today part of: Oita Prefecture

Location of Saiki Castle
Saiki Domain (Japan)

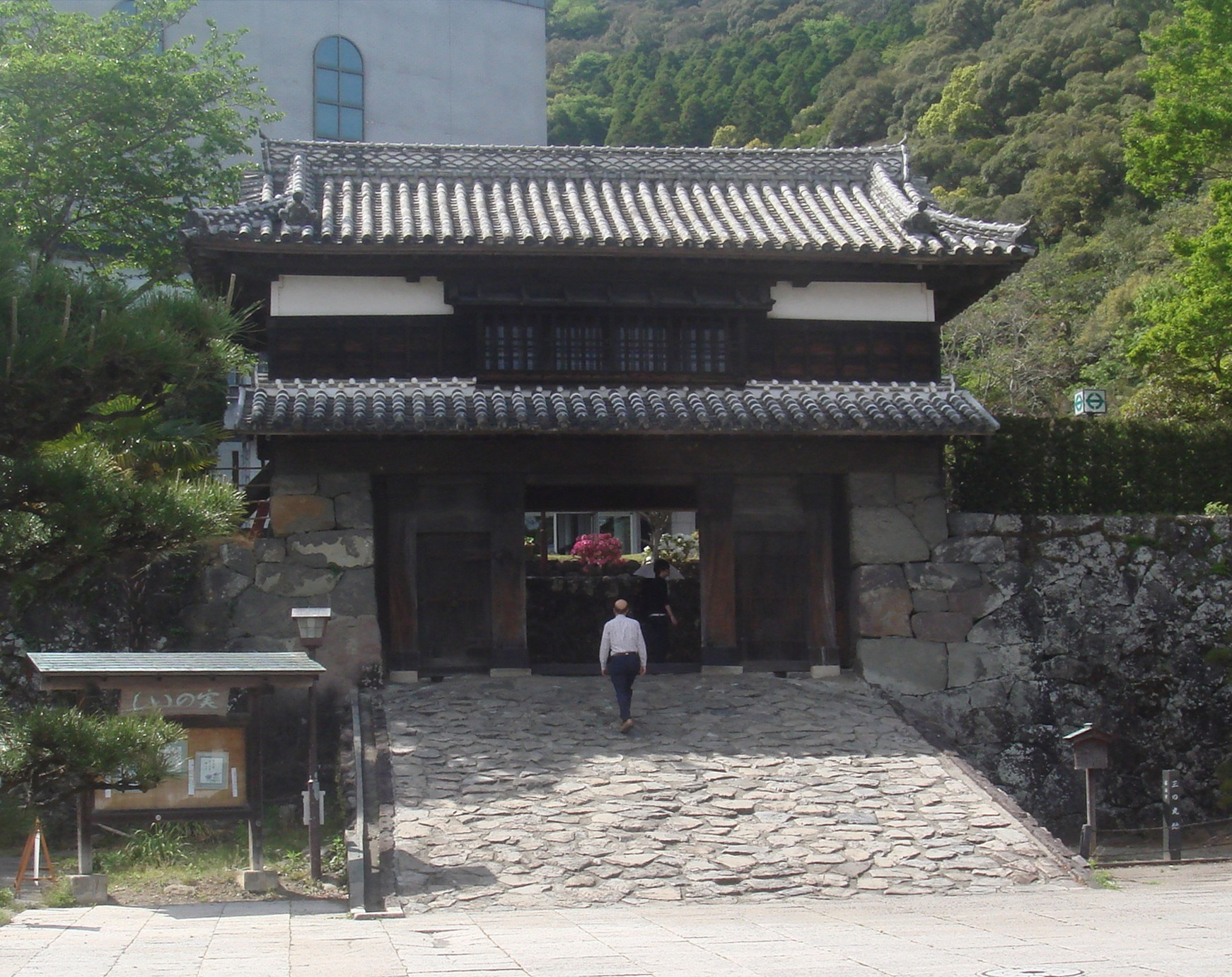
Gate of Saiki Castle

Saiki Domain (佐伯藩, Saiki-han) was a feudal domain under the Tokugawa shogunate of Edo period Japan, in what is now southern Ōita Prefecture. It was centered around Saiki Castle in what is now the city of Saiki, Ōita and was ruled by the tozama daimyō Mōri clan for all of its history.

== History ==
Bungo Province was under the control of the Ōtomo clan from the Kamakura period to the Sengoku period. One of their senior retainers was the Saiki clan who controlled the Saiki shōen located where the modern city is now built. Under the tenure of the Kirishitan warlord Ōtomo Sōrin, the Ōtomo clan invaded Hyūga Province but was defeated by the Shimazu clan from 1586, and were confined to Nyūjima Castle (the predecessor of Usuki Castle). During the Shimazu counter-invasion, Saiki Koresada stubbornly resisted calls to surrender and defeated a much larger Shimazu force at the Battle of Katata, forcing the Shimazu to move on without taking his territory. The Ōtomo were saved by Toyotomi Hideyoshi's 1586–1587 Kyūshū campaign and were allowed to reclaim Bungo province as their territory. However, Ōtomo Yoshimune (Sōrin's son) behaved in a cowardly manner during the Japanese invasions of Korea (1592–1598) which so angered Hideyoshi that he was deprived of his fief and banished. The Saiki suffered the fate of their overlords, and Saiki Koresada became a ronin and then entered into the service of other warlords, preserving his family name. Bungo was divided into small fiefs, and in 1596 assigned Mōri Takamasa as magistrate over 20,000 koku in Saiki and overseer of 80,000 koku of Hideyoshi's own holdings in the same area. Mōri Takamasa was not related to the Mōri clan of Chōshū Domain. In 1582 when Oda Nobunaga was assassinated at the Honnō-ji Incident, Toyotomi Hideyoshi was fighting the Mōri clan at Bitchū Takamatsu Castle and was forced to disengage and return to Kyoto post haste to deal with Akechi Mitsuhide. During negotiations, he agreed to leave behind Mōri Takamasa as a hostage. Mōri Terumoto liked him so much that he changed his surname from [森] to [毛利].

When Hideyoshi died in 1598, Mōri Takamasa was still in Korea. After his return, he had a severe falling out with Ishida Mitsunari over his actions on Korea; however, he still remained loyal to the Western Army and led his forces at the Siege of Tanabe in 1600. He defected to the Eastern Army shortly after the Battle of Sekigahara at the persuasion of Tōdō Takatora and through his intercession was relocated by Tokugawa Ieyasu to a 20,000 koku holding in Bungo Province in 1601. This marks the start of Saiki Domain, and throughout the Edo period, the Mōri clan continued to rule Saiki for twelve generations.

When Mōri Takamasa entered his territory, he found that the existing stronghold of Togamure Castle was located in a remote area, so he built Saeki Castle at the mouth of the Bansho River and opened a new jōkamachi. Construction started in 1602 and completed in 1606. Saeki Domain was hilly and had little arable land, so income from agriculture was low; however, the coast is a ria coast with many lagoons, and suitable for fishing and marine transportation, which became the pillar of the domain's finances. Forestry was also an important source of income.

The 6th daimyō, Mōri Takayoshi encouraged literary and martial arts, and worked to promote industry in order to rebuild the domain's chaotic administration. He was noted for his intolerance of wrongdoing, and he expelled retainers from the territory or dismissed them from their posts.He laid the foundation for the later establishment of a domain academy, and also focused on disaster countermeasures. In response to the damage caused by the 1707 Hōei earthquake, he built an embankment as a tsunami countermeasure and established a firefighting organization. The 7th daimyō, Mōri Takaoka, continued his grandfather's efforts to reform the domain's administration and dismissed retainers and magistrates on grounds of misconduct. However, during Takaoka's time, the domain's finances were under strain, and the domain was on the verge of bankruptcy, racking up debt after debt and struggling even to pay interest. He attempted to rebuild domain finances by implementing a controlled economy and tightening regulations by strengthening monopolies, especially on salt. The 8th daimyō, Mōri Takasue enforced three thrift edicts, halved the stipend of retainers of 200 koku or more, reduced expenditures, issued hansatsu bank notes. He also opened the han school "Shikodo" in 1777 and by 1784, the school had amassed a collection of 80,000 books. However, during the late Edo period, natural disasters and fires occurred frequently, and as a result, the lives of the people of the domain were poor and the domain's finances were in crisis. In January 1812, a peasant uprising consisting of 4,000 people broke out, and was suppressed with much difficulty, resulting in casualties.

In the Bakumatsu period, the last daimyō, Mōri Takaaki, modernized the domain's military despite financial difficulties. He made gunpowder and cannons, and also built a battery in Saeki Bay. He was also member of group of daimyō who had an audience with Emperor Kōmei and was a supporter of the Meiji restoration from an early stage. In 1871, due to the abolition of the han system, Saiki Domain became Saiki Prefecture, and was later incorporated into Ōita Prefecture. The Mōri clan was elevated to the kazoku peerage with the title of viscount in 1884.

== Holdings at the end of the Edo period ==
As with most domains in the han system, Saiki Domain consisted of several discontinuous territories calculated to provide the assigned kokudaka, based on periodic cadastral surveys and projected agricultural yields.

- Bungo Province
  - 156 villages in Amabe District
  - 10 villages in Amabe District that were tenryō, but administered by Saiki Domain

== List of daimyō ==
#	Name	Tenure	Courtesy title	Court Rank	kokudaka
Mōri clan, 1601–1871 (Tozama)
1	Mōri Takamasa (毛利貞通)	1601–1628	Ise-no-kami (伊勢守)	Junior 5th Rank, Lower Grade (従五位下)	20,000 koku
2	Mōri Takanari (毛利高成)	1628–1632	Settsu-no-kami (摂津守)	Junior 5th Rank, Lower Grade (従五位下)	20,000 koku
3	Mōri Takanao (毛利高直)	1633–1664	Ise-no-kami (伊勢守)	Junior 5th Rank, Lower Grade (従五位下)	20,000 koku
4	Mōri Takashige (毛利高重)	1664–1682	Awa-no-kami (安房守)	Junior 5th Rank, Lower Grade (従五位下)	20,000 koku
5	Mōri Takahisa (毛利高久)	1682–1699	Suruga-no-kami (駿河守)	Junior 5th Rank, Lower Grade (従五位下)	20,000 koku
6	Mōri Takayoshi (毛利高慶)	1699–1742	Suō-no-kami (周防守)	Junior 5th Rank, Lower Grade (従五位下)	20,000 koku
7	Mōri Takaoka (毛利高丘)	1742–1760	Suō-no-kami (周防守)	Junior 5th Rank, Lower Grade (従五位下)	20,000 koku
8	Mōri Takasue (毛利高標)	1760–1801	Ise-no-kami (伊勢守)	Junior 5th Rank, Lower Grade (従五位下)	20,000 koku
9	Mōri Takanobu (毛利高誠)	1801–1812	Mino-no-kami (美濃守)	Junior 5th Rank, Lower Grade (従五位下)	20,000 koku
10	Mōri Takanaka (毛利高翰)	1812–1832	Wakasa-no-kami (若狭守)	Junior 5th Rank, Lower Grade (従五位下)	20,000 koku
11	Mōri Takayasu 毛利高泰)	1832–1862	Ise-no-kami (伊勢守)	Junior 5th Rank, Lower Grade (従五位下)	20,000 koku
12	Mōri Takaaki (毛利高謙)	1862–1871	Ise-no-kami (伊勢守)	Junior 5th Rank, Lower Grade (従五位下)	20,000 koku

== See also ==
- List of Han
- Abolition of the han system
