= Kōzaki Station (Ōita) =

Railway station in Ōita, Ōita Prefecture, Japan

Kōzaki Station 幸崎駅
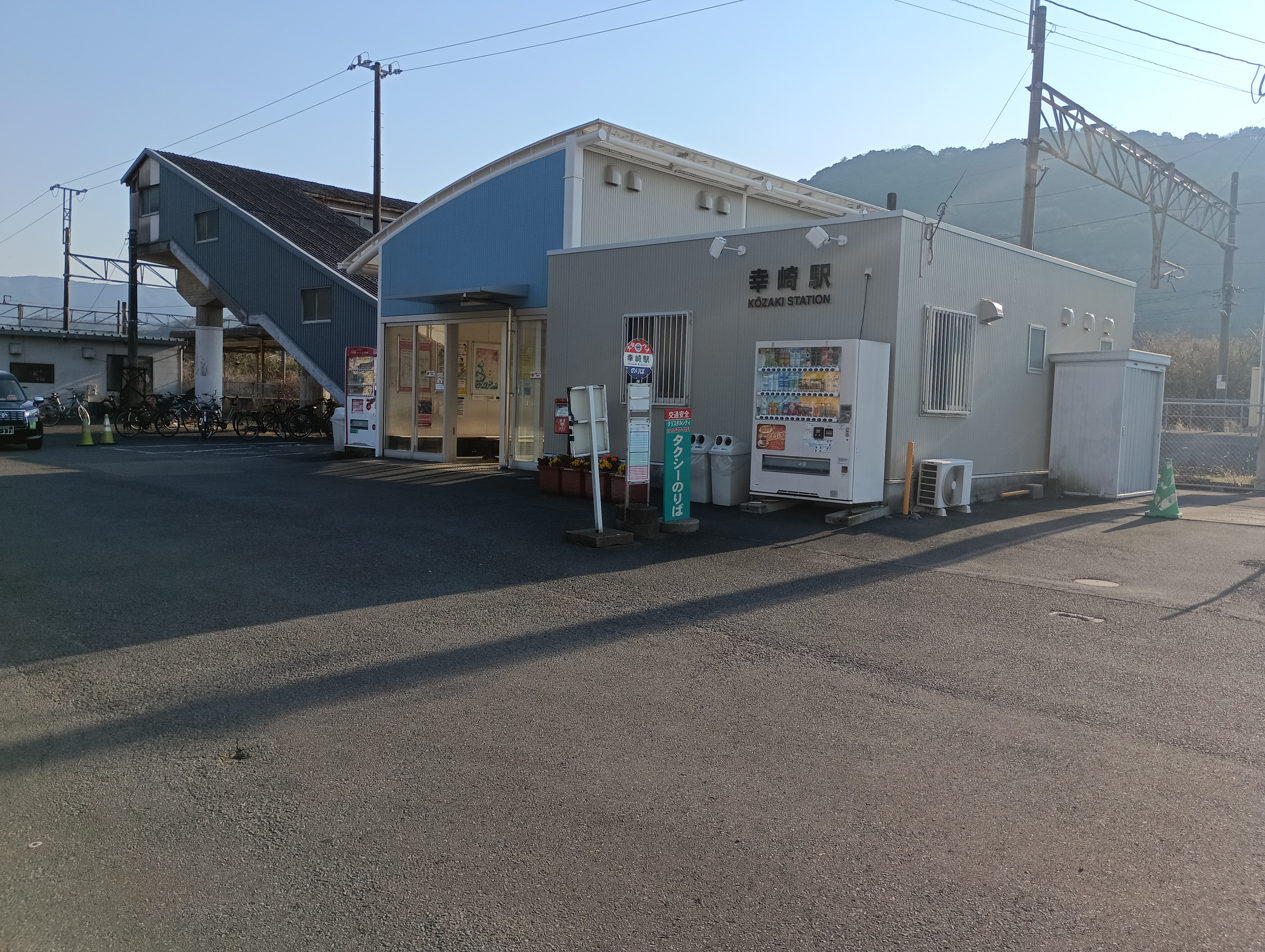
- Kōzaki Station in 2026

General information
- Location: Honkozaki 260, Ōita-shi, Ōita-ken, 879-2111; Japan
- Coordinates: 33°14′02″N 131°47′43″E
- Operator: JR Kyushu
- Line: ■ Nippō Main Line
- Distance: 151.8 km from Kokura
- Platforms: 1 side + 1 island platforms
- Tracks: 3 (1 is a siding) + several other sidings

Construction
- Structure type: At grade
- Parking: Available
- Cycle facilities: Designated parking area for bikes
- Accessible: No - platforms accessed by footbridge

Other information
- Status: Unstaffed
- Website: Official website

History
- Opened: 1 April 1914

Passengers
- FY2015: 349 daily

Services
Preceding station	JR Kyushu	Following station
Sashiu towards Kagoshima	Nippō Main Line	Sakanoichi towards Kokura
Location
- Location within Oita Prefecture Location within Japan

Kōzaki Station (幸崎駅, Kōzaki-eki) is a passenger railway station located in Ōita City, Ōita Prefecture, Japan. It is operated by JR Kyushu. The station serves the Ōita suburb of Sakanoichi.

== Lines ==
The station is served by the Nippō Main Line and is located 151.8 km from the starting point of the line at Kokura.

== Layout ==
The station consists of an island platform and a side platform serving three tracks at grade. Platforms/tracks 1 and 2 are located on the island while platform 3 is a side platform served by track 3 which is a siding. The station building, a modern structure completed in 2009, is located next to the tracks nearest track 1 and not in contact with any platform. It houses a waiting area, an automatic ticket vending machine, a SUGOCA card reader and a ticket window (which is, at present, not staffed). Access from the station building to the platforms is by means of a footbridge. Several sidings also run in between track 1 and the station building.

=== Platforms ===
1	■ ■ Nippō Main Line	for Saiki and Nobeoka
2, 3	■ ■ Nippō Main Line	for Ōita and Beppu

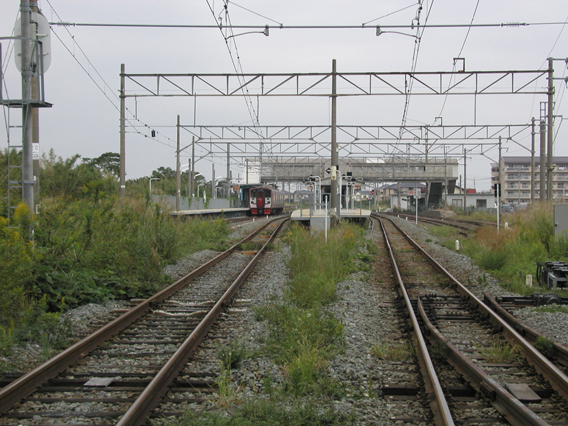
A view of the platforms and tracks. The train is standing on track 3 which is a siding. To the right, some sidings can be seen between the island platform and the station building.

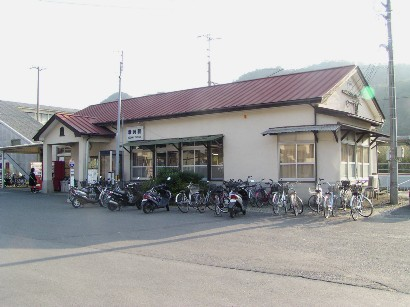
The old station building. This photo was taken in 2005.

== History ==
The private Kyushu Railway had, by 1909, through acquisition and its own expansion, established a track from Kokura to Yanagigaura. The Kyushu Railway was nationalised on 1 July 1907. Japanese Government Railways (JGR), designated the track as the Hōshū Main Line on 12 October 1909 and expanded it southwards in phases, with Kōzaki opening as the new southern terminus on 1 April 1914. It became a through-station on 15 August 1915 when the track was extended further south to Usuki. On 15 December 1923, the Hōshū Main Line was renamed the Nippō Main Line. With the privatization of Japanese National Railways (JNR), the successor of JGR, on 1 April 1987, the station came under the control of JR Kyushu.

JR Kyushu stopped staffing Kōzaki in 2016 because of declining passenger traffic. However, on 17 March 2018, "Smart Support" facilities were added to the station. Under this scheme, although there would not be railway personnel in attendance, passengers could receive assistance via intercom from staff at a central support centre.

== Passenger statistics ==
In fiscal 2015, there were a total of 127,334 boarding passengers, giving a daily average of 349 passengers.

== Surrounding area ==
- Japan National Route 197
- Tsukiyama Kofun

== See also ==
- List of railway stations in Japan
