= Tsukiyama Kofun =

- 築山古墳 (Japanese)
- Tsukiyama Kofun Tsukiyama Kofun (Japan)
- Interactive map of Tsukiyama Kofun
- 33°14′19.6″N 131°48′6.2″E
- Type: Kofun
- Periods: Kofun period
- Location: Ōita, Ōita, Japan
- Region: Kyushu

History
- Built: c.5th century

Site notes
- Public access: Yes (no facilities)

The Tsukiyama Kofun (築山古墳) is a Kofun period keyhole-shaped burial mound, located in the Saganoseki neighborhood of the city of Ōita on the island of Kyushu, Japan. The tumulus was designated a National Historic Site of Japan in 1932.

== Overview ==
The Tsukiyama Kofun is located on a hill that protrudes from the northwest coast of the Saganoseki Peninsula. It is located about one kilometer southeast of the Nekozuka Kofun (where grave goods included pieces of bronze mirrors from the Eastern Han dynasty). The northern portion of the tumulus is within the precincts of a local Hachiman Shrine. It is a zenpō-kōen-fun (前方後円墳), which is shaped like a keyhole, having one square end and one circular end, when viewed from above. The total length of the tumulus is 90 meters, with a 40-meter diameter and 10-meter high posterior circular portion, and 45 meter wide by eight-meter high anterior rectangular portion. The mound appears to have originally been covered with fukiishi.

When excavated in 1932, archaeologists discovered that it was one of the most luxurious burials in the prefecture, with a total of 34 kg of vermilion used in the burial chamber. The tumulus contained two box-shaped sarcophagi made of chlorite schist . The northern sarcophagus contained has the remains of a woman with a shellfish bracelet attached to the right arm, and the southern sarcophagus contained the bones of three people, one of whom was female. The northern burial in particular led to speculation that the grave was that of a priestess or shaman, and added more speculation to the Yamataikoku debate. In 1966, the tumulus was re-excavated, as surrounding residents had built roads and houses that cut the front and back parts of the mound, to the extent that is no longer had a keyhole-shape.

The tomb had never been robbed. From the north burial, only 11 shellfish and two cylindrical beads were found; however, from the southern burial pieces of linen and silk fabric (it is thought that the inside of the sarcophagus was decorated with vermilion and the body was placed on top of silk), 11 iron swords (including ring-hilt swords), 4 iron daggers, one bronze mirror, 180 small glass beads, 90 iron arrowheads, and a variety of iron agricultural tools (5 ax heads, 13 hoe tips, 2 knives, 2 sickles, 3 harpoons, 6 tweezers). Based on these grave goods, it is estimated that the tumulus was constructed around the middle of the 5th century.

The tumulus is located near Kōzaki Station on the JR Kyushu Nippō Main Line.

== See also ==
- List of Historic Sites of Japan (Ōita)
