= Yonōzu, Ōita =

Village in Minamiamabe, Ōita, Japan

Yonōzu (米水津村, Yonōzu-mura) was a village located in Minamiamabe District, Ōita Prefecture, Japan.

As of 2003, the village had an estimated population of 2,388 and the density of 94.46 persons per km^{2}. The total area was 25.28 km^{2}.

On March 3, 2005, Yonōzu, along with the towns of Kamae, Kamiura, Tsurumi, Ume and Yayoi, and the villages of Honjō and Naokawa (all from Minamiamabe District), was merged into the expanded city of Saiki.
