= Kamiura, Ōita =

Dissolved municipality in Ōita prefecture, Japan

Kamiura (上浦町, Kamiura-machi) was a town located in Minamiamabe District, Ōita Prefecture, Japan.

As of 2003, the town had an estimated population of 2,588 and the density of 165.05 persons per km^{2}. The total area was 15.68 km^{2}.

On March 3, 2005, Kamiura, along with the towns of Kamae, Tsurumi, Ume and Yayoi, and the villages of Honjō, Naokawa and Yonōzu (all from Minamiamabe District), was merged into the expanded city of Saiki.
