= Yayoi, Ōita =

Dissolved municipality in Minamiamabe district, Ōita prefecture, Japan

Yayoi (弥生町, Yayoi-machi) was a town located in Minamiamabe District, Ōita Prefecture, Japan.

As of 2003, the town had an estimated population of 7,248 and the density of 87.44 persons per km^{2}. The total area was 82.89 km^{2}.

On March 3, 2005, Yayoi, along with the towns of Kamae, Kamiura, Tsurumi and Ume, and the villages of Honjō, Naokawa and Yonōzu (all from Minamiamabe District), was merged into the expanded city of Saiki.
