= Honjō, Ōita =

Village in Ōita Prefecture, Japan

Honjō (本匠村, Honjō-mura) was a village located in Minamiamabe District, Ōita Prefecture, Japan.

As of 2003, the village had an estimated population of 1,974 and the density of 16.03 persons per km^{2}. The total area was 123.15 km^{2}.

On March 3, 2005, Honjō, along with the towns of Kamae, Kamiura, Tsurumi, Ume and Yayoi, and the villages of Naokawa and Yonōzu (all from Minamiamabe District), was merged into the expanded city of Saiki.
