= Ume, Ōita =

Dissolved municipality in Ōita prefecture, Japan

Ume (宇目町, Ume-machi) was a town located in Minamiamabe District, Ōita Prefecture, Japan.

As of 2003, the town had an estimated population of 3,529 and the density of 13.27 persons per km^{2}. The total area was 265.99 km^{2}.

On March 3, 2005, Ume, along with the towns of Kamae, Kamiura, Tsurumi and Yayoi, and the villages of Honjō, Naokawa and Yonōzu (all from Minamiamabe District), was merged into the expanded city of Saiki.

Ume was famous for its Totoro bus stop.
