= Minamiamabe District, Ōita =

Former district in Ōita prefecture, Japan

Minamiamabe (南海部郡, Minamiamabe-gun) was a district located in Ōita Prefecture, Japan.

As of 2003, the district had an estimated population of 33,239 and the density of 47.09 persons per km^{2}. The total area was 705.90 km^{2}.

== Towns and villages ==
- Honjō
- Kamae
- Kamiura
- Naokawa
- Tsurumi
- Ume
- Yayoi
- Yonōzu

== Merger ==
- On March 3, 2005 – the towns of Kamae, Kamiura, Tsurumi, Ume and Yayoi, and the villages of Honjō, Naokawa and Yonōzu were merged into the expanded city of Saiki.
