= Kamae, Ōita =

Japanese town

Kamae (蒲江町, Kamae-chō) was a town located in Minamiamabe District, Ōita Prefecture, Japan.

As of 2003, the town had an estimated population of 8,612 and the density of 93.76 persons per km^{2}. The total area was 91.85 km^{2}.

On March 3, 2005, Kamae, along with the towns of Kamiura, Tsurumi, Ume and Yayoi, and the villages of Honjō, Naokawa and Yonōzu (all from Minamiamabe District), was merged into the expanded city of Saiki.
