= Naokawa, Ōita =

Village in Ōita Prefecture, Japan

Naokawa (直川村, Naokawa-son) was a village in Minamiamabe District, Ōita Prefecture, Japan.

As of 2003, the village had an estimated population of 2,765 and the density of 34.21 persons per km^{2}. The total area was 80.82 km^{2}.

On March 3, 2005, Naokawa, along with the towns of Kamae, Kamiura, Tsurumi, Ume and Yayoi, and the villages of Honjō and Yonōzu (all from Minamiamabe District), was merged into the expanded city of Saiki.
