= Saiki Castle =

Castle ruins in Saiki, Ōita, Japan

- 佐伯城
- Saiki, Ōita Japan
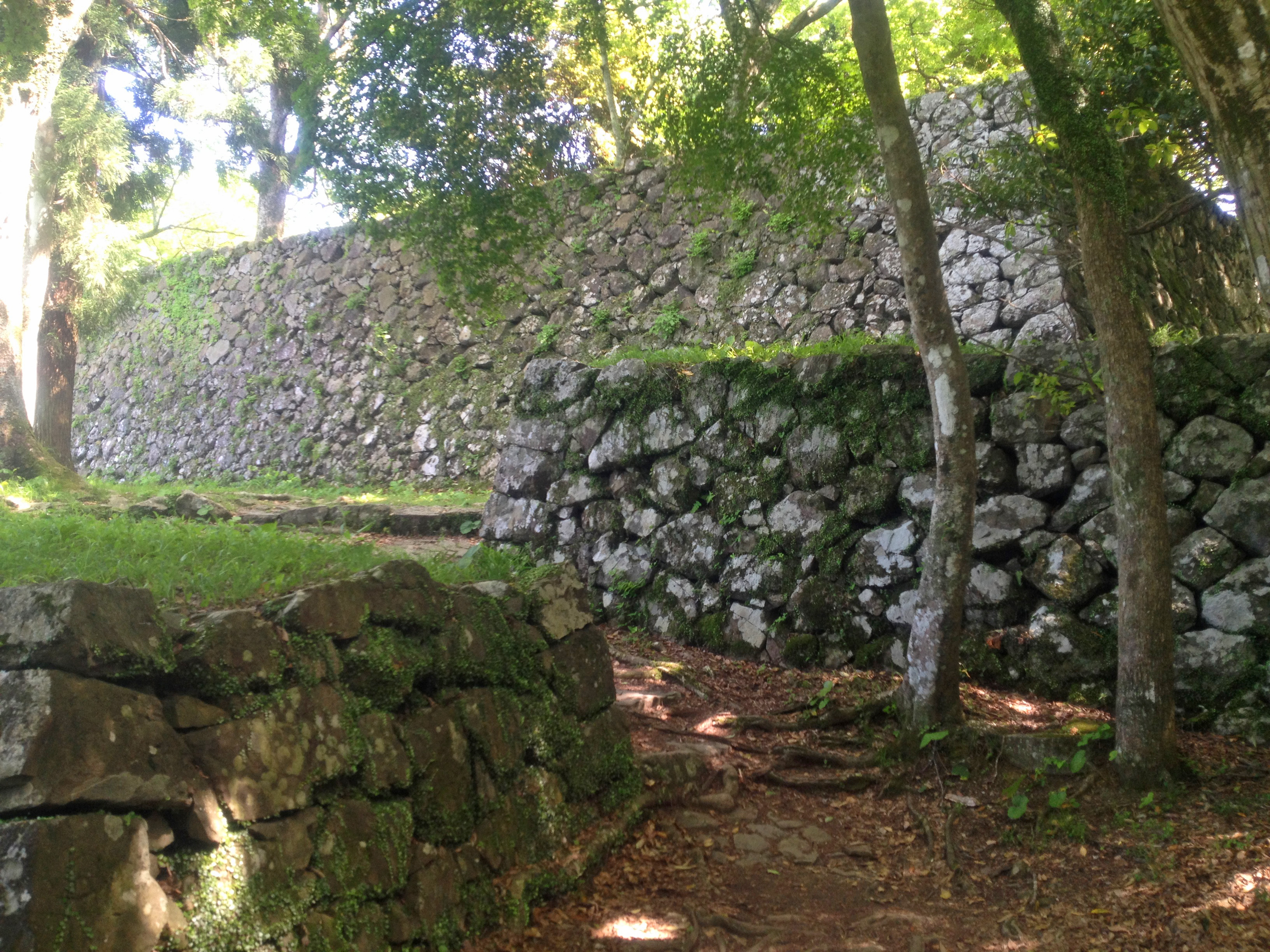
- Walls of Saiki Castle

Site information
- Type: yamajiro-style Japanese castle
- Controlled by: Mōri clan
- Open to the public: yes
- Condition: Archaeological and designated national historical site; castle ruins

Location
- Location within Oita Prefecture Location within Japan
- Coordinates: 32°57′36.83″N 131°53′23.35″E

Site history
- Built: 1602-1606
- Built by: Mōri Takamasa
- In use: Edo period
- National Historic Site of Japan

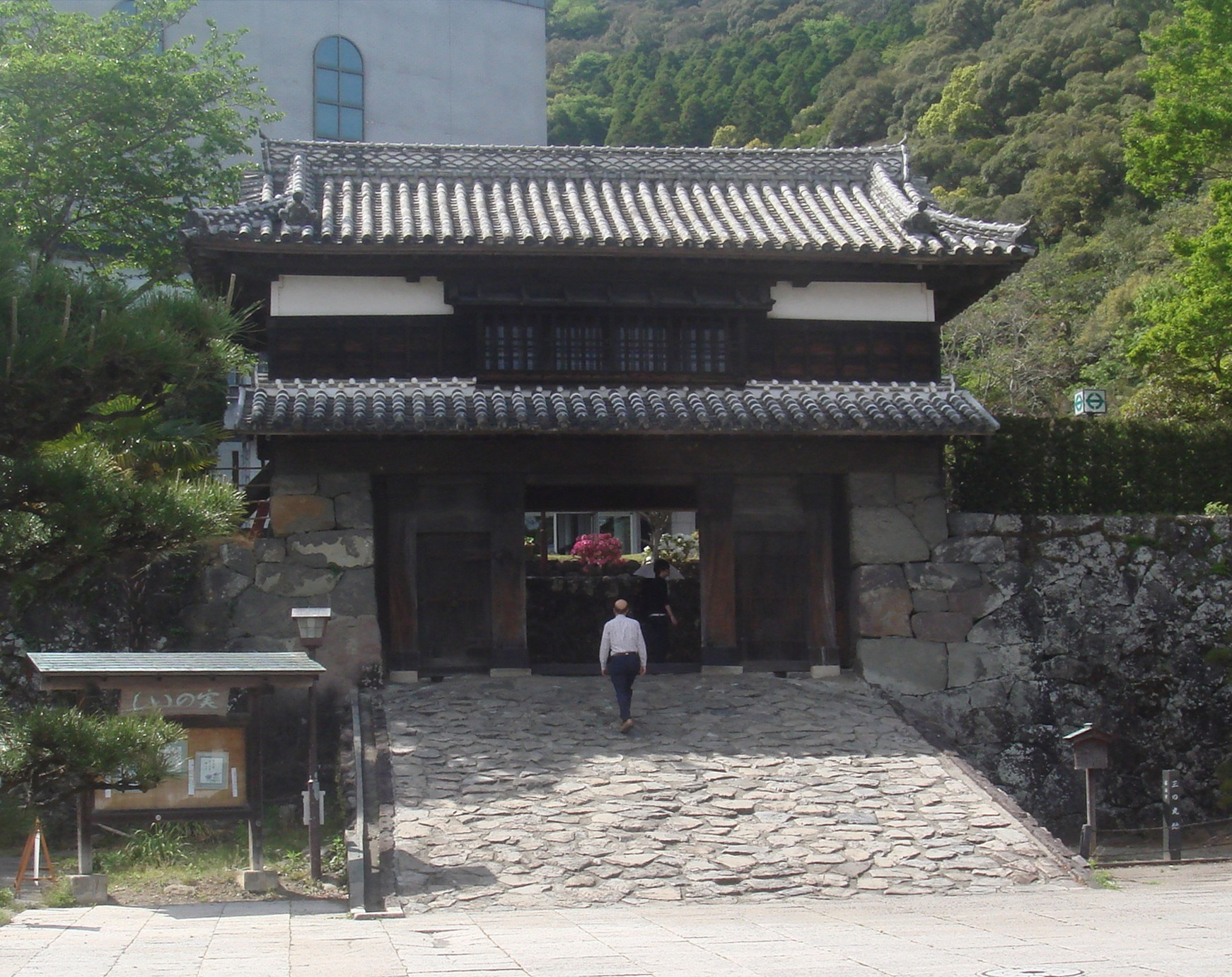
San-no-maru Yagura-mon

Saiki Castle (佐伯城, Saiki-jō) was an Edo period yamajiro-style Japanese castle located in the city of Saiki, Ōita Prefecture, Japan. Its ruins have been protected as a National Historic Site since 2023. It is No.194 on the list "Continued 100 Fine Castles of Japan".

== Overview ==
Saiki Castle is located on the 150-meter Mount Shiroyama at the center of Saiki city. Saiki occupies the alluvial delta at the mouth of the Bansho River, on the south border of former Bungo Province. In the Heian period, this area was under the control of the Saeki clan, an ancient local clan who cooperated when the Ōtomo clan was made shugo of Bungo Province by the Kamakura shogunate. Their stronghold was Togamure Castle on a mountain two kilometers upstream of Saiki Castle. In the Sengoku period, the Ōtomo clan began aggressively expanding their control both to the north and south; however, they suffered a severe defeat in battles against the powerful Shimazu clan from Satsuma Province. They were saved by the intervention of Toyotomi Hideyoshi, who began his conquest of Kyushu in 1586. The Ōtomo were restored to control of Bungo Province; however, Ōtomo Yoshimune was subsequently accused of cowardice during the Japanese invasions of Korea (1592–1598) and was dispossessed. As retainers of the Ōtomo, the Saeki clan suffered the same fate, eventually becoming retainers of the Tōdō clan.

Mori Takamasa, an old retainer of Hideyoshi, was given control over the Saiki territories, along with the Hita and Kusu regions of Bungo. He constructed Hikuma Castle in Hita as his main stronghold and kept Togamure Castle as a secondary fortification. Despite his dislike for Ishida Mitsunari he still remained loyal to the Western Army and led his forces at the Siege of Tanabe in 1600. He defeated to the Eastern Army shortly after the Battle of Sekigahara at the persuasion of Tōdō Takatora and through his intercession was relocated by Tokugawa Ieyasu to a 20,000 koku holding in Bungo Province in 1601. This marks the start of Saiki Domain, and throughout the Edo period, the Mōri clan continued to rule Saiki for twelve generations. When Mōri Takamasa entered his territory, he found that the existing stronghold of Togamure Castle was located in a remote area, so he built Saeki Castle at the mouth of the Bansho River and opened a new jōkamachi. Construction started in 1602 and completed in 1606. The design of the castle and work was overseen by Ichida Yusada, a former vassal of Oda Nobunaga who had been in charge of building Azuchi Castle, and the stone walls was built by Hayama Kanzaemon Hayama, a master who had overseen the construction of Himeji Castle's stone walls.

The castle utilizes the peak of the mountain and two straight ridges that extended northeast and southwest from the peak. The central area is about 50 meter long square shaped area, protected by tall stone wall. In this upper terrace there is a 20 meter square foundation of the three-story tenshu, which was lost by fire just after about 15 years from construction. The second enclosure is connected to central area by a bridge over dry moat. It is the largest enclsoure in the castle, and contained warehouses and barracks. Adjacent to the secondary area were the Western and Northern bastions, secured by yagura watchtowers.

However, as the castle was located over a steep mountain, it was inconvenient in times of peace period, and in 1637 the San-no-maru enclosure was built at the base of the mountain for the daimyō residence and administrative offices of Saiki Domain. The main enclsoure and secondary enclosure were left in severe disrepair, although the tenshu was reconstructed and repaired in 1709.

== Current status ==
Following the Meiji restoration, all buildings of the castle were sold off or destroyed in 1871 and the site became a park, with the Saiki City Cultural Hall built on the site of the San-no-maru enclosure. Part of the Sannomaru Palace was relocated to Funato-cho in the city as a district meeting place and still exists today. The Sannomaru Yagura Gate also still exists and is an Oita Prefecture Tangible Cultural Property. The castle site is located a 20-minute walk from Saiki Station on the JR Kyushu Nippo Main Line.

== See also ==
- List of Historic Sites of Japan (Ōita)

== Literature ==
- Benesch, Oleg and Ran Zwigenberg (2019). Japan's Castles: Citadels of Modernity in War and Peace. Cambridge: Cambridge University Press. p. 374. ISBN 9781108481946.
- De Lange, William (2021). An Encyclopedia of Japanese Castles. Groningen: Toyo Press. pp. 600 pages. ISBN 978-9492722300.
