= Tsurumi, Ōita =

Dissolved municipality in Ōita prefecture, Japan

Tsurumi (鶴見町, Tsurumi-machi) was a town located in Minamiamabe District, Ōita Prefecture, Japan.

As of 2003, the town had an estimated population of 4,135 and the density of 204.3 persons per km^{2}. The total area was 20.24 km^{2}.

On March 3, 2005, Tsurumi, along with the towns of Kamae, Kamiura, Ume and Yayoi, and the villages of Honjō, Naokawa and Yonōzu (all from Minamiamabe District), was merged into the expanded city of Saiki.
