= Naokawa Station =

Railway station in Saiki, Ōita Prefecture, Japan

Naokawa Station 直川駅
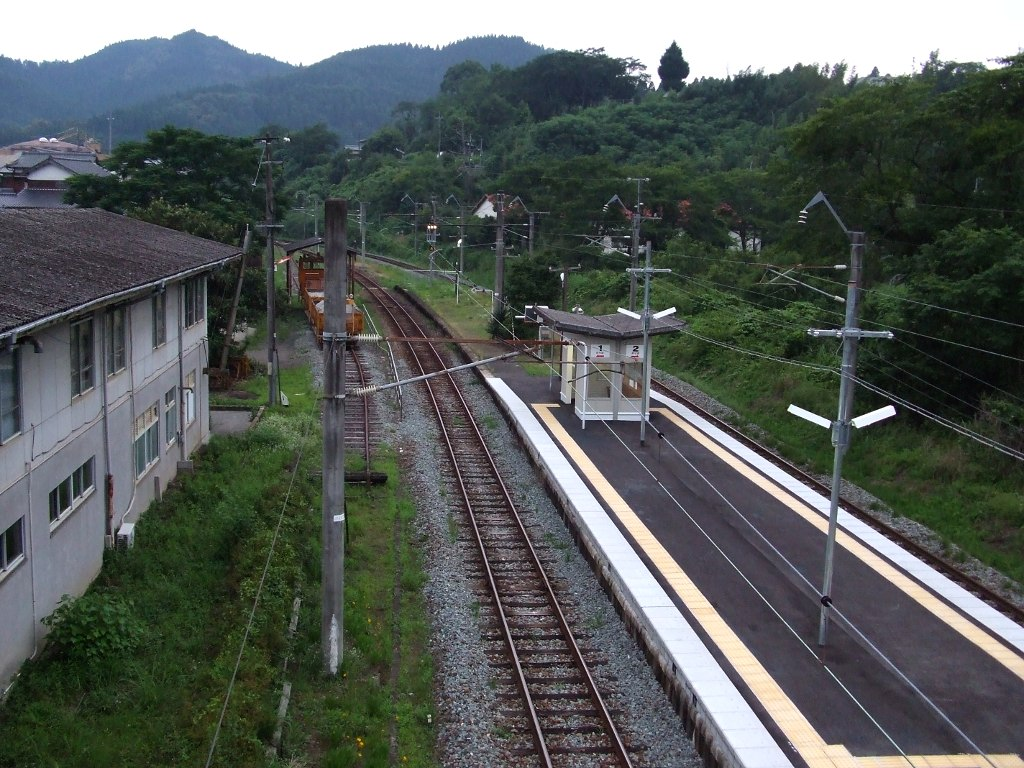
- Naokawa Station in July 2009

General information
- Location: Naokawa Oaza Kaminaomi, Saiki-shi, Ōita-ken 879-3102; Japan
- Coordinates: 32°53′56″N 131°46′47″E
- Operator: JR Kyushu
- Line: ■ Nippō Main Line
- Distance: 213.6 km from Kokura
- Platforms: 1 island platform
- Tracks: 2

Construction
- Accessible: No - platform accessed by footbridge

Other information
- Status: Unattended
- Website: Official website

History
- Opened: 20 November 1920
- Former names: Gonohara (until 1961)

Passengers
- FY2015: 15

Services
Preceding station	JR Kyushu	Following station
Shigeoka towards Kagoshima	Nippō Main Line	Naomi towards Kokura
Location
- Location within Oita Prefecture Location within Japan

Naokawa Station (直川駅, Naokawa-eki) is a passenger railway station located in the city of Saiki, Ōita, Japan, operated by JR Kyushu.

== Lines ==
Naokawa Station is served by the Nippō Main Line and is located 213.6 km from the starting point of the line at Kokura.

== Layout ==
The station, which is not staffed, consists of an island platform serving two tracks. There is no station building, but only a shelter on the platform. Access to the island platform is by means of a footbridge.

=== Platforms ===
1	■ ■ Nippō Main Line	for Nobeoka
2	■ ■ Nippō Main Line	for Saiki

== History ==
The private Kyushu Railway had, by 1909, through acquisition and its own expansion, established a track from Kokura to Yanagigaura. The Kyushu Railway was nationalised on 1 July 1907. Japanese Government Railways (JGR), designated the track as the Hōshū Main Line on 12 October 1909 and expanded it southwards in phases, with this station opening on 20 November 1920 with the name Gonohara (神原) as the new southern terminus. On 26 March 1922, Gonohara became a through-station when the track was extended to Shigeoka. On 15 December 1923, the Hōshū Main Line which served the station had linked up with the Miyazaki Main Line to the south. Through traffic was established from Kokura to Miyakonojō. The entire stretch of track was then renamed the Nippō Main Line. On 20 March 1961, Gonohara was renamed Naokawa. With the privatization of Japanese National Railways (JNR), the successor of JGR, on 1 April 1987, the station came under the control of JR Kyushu.

== Passenger statistics ==
In fiscal 2015, there were a total of 5,613 boarding passengers, giving a daily average of 15 passengers.

== Surrounding area ==
- Saiki City Naokawa Promotion Bureau Office (formerly Naokawa Village Hall)
- Naokawa District Community Center
- Saiki City Naokawa Junior High School
- Saiki City Naokawa Elementary School

== See also ==
- List of railway stations in Japan
