= Saiki, Ōita =

City in Ōita Prefecture, Japan

Saiki 佐伯市
- City
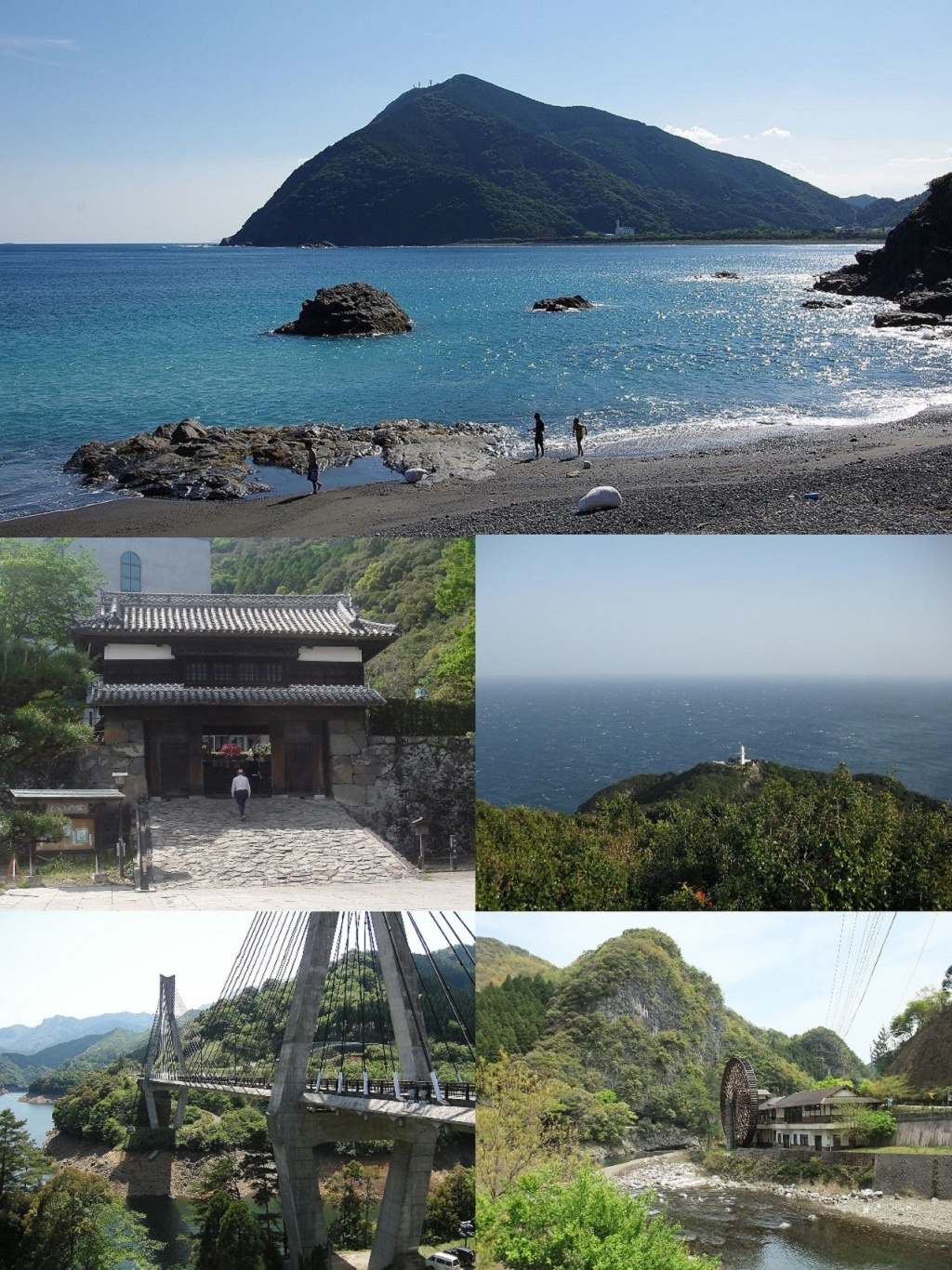
Motozaru Beach
Saiki Castle	Cape Tsurumisaki
Utagenka Bridge	Kohan Forest Park
- Flag Seal
- Location of Saiki in Ōita Prefecture

- Location in Japan
- Coordinates: 32°57′35″N 131°54′00″E
- Country: Japan
- Region: Kyushu
- Prefecture: Ōita

Government
  - Mayor: Tomitaka Kuniko

Area
  - Total: 903.11 km^{2} (348.69 sq mi)

Population (October 31, 2023)
  - Total: 65,870
  - Density: 72.94/km^{2} (188.9/sq mi)
- Time zone: UTC+09:00 (JST)
- City hall address: 1-1, Nakamura Minamimachi, Saiki-shi, Ōita-ken 876-8585
- Climate: Cfa
- Website: Official website
- Symbols
- Bird: Japanese white-eye
- Fish: Sea: Aji; River: Ayu
- Flower: Yamazakura (Prunus jamasakura)
- Tree: Oak

Saiki (佐伯市, Saiki-shi) is a city located in Ōita Prefecture, Japan. As of 31 October 2023, the city had an estimated population of 65,870 in 32921 households, and a population density of 73 persons per km^{2}. The total area of the city is 903.11 km^{2} (348.69 sq mi), making it the largest city by area in Kyushu.

== Geography ==
Saiki is located in southeastern Ōita Prefecture, approximately 60 kilometers southeast of the prefectural capital at Ōita City. The eastern part faces the Bungo Channel and is within the borders of the Nippō Kaigan Quasi-National Park. It is noted for its ria coastal areas. The inland area of the city is mountainous and within the borders of the Sobo-Katamuki Quasi-National Park. The city is built on the largest alluvial plain in the prefecture, created by the Bansho River, a first-class river that flows through the city.

=== Neighboring municipalities ===
Miyazaki Prefecture

- Hinokage
- Nobeoka

Ōita Prefecture

- Bungo-Ōno
- Tsukumi

=== Climate ===
Saiki has a humid subtropical climate (Köppen climate classification Cfa) with hot summers and cool winters. Precipitation is significant throughout the year, but is somewhat lower in winter. The average annual temperature in Saiki is 16.7 °C (62.1 °F). The average annual rainfall is 2,118.9 mm (83.42 in) with September as the wettest month. The temperatures are highest on average in August, at around 27.3 °C (81.1 °F), and lowest in January, at around 6.7 °C (44.1 °F). The highest temperature ever recorded in Saiki was 38.5 °C (101.3 °F) on 28 July 2026; the coldest temperature ever recorded was −10.5 °C (13.1 °F) on 11 February 1996.

Climate data for Saiki (1991−2020 normals, extremes 1977−present)
Month	Jan	Feb	Mar	Apr	May	Jun	Jul	Aug	Sep	Oct	Nov	Dec	Year
Record high °C (°F)	21.5 (70.7)	23.5 (74.3)	27.9 (82.2)	28.7 (83.7)	31.9 (89.4)	34.9 (94.8)	36.2 (97.2)	37.1 (98.8)	35.4 (95.7)	32.0 (89.6)	28.6 (83.5)	24.3 (75.7)	37.1 (98.8)
Mean daily maximum °C (°F)	11.0 (51.8)	11.7 (53.1)	14.9 (58.8)	19.7 (67.5)	23.7 (74.7)	26.1 (79.0)	30.1 (86.2)	31.3 (88.3)	27.9 (82.2)	23.2 (73.8)	18.2 (64.8)	13.2 (55.8)	20.9 (69.7)
Daily mean °C (°F)	6.7 (44.1)	7.5 (45.5)	10.5 (50.9)	15.1 (59.2)	19.3 (66.7)	22.4 (72.3)	26.3 (79.3)	27.3 (81.1)	24.1 (75.4)	19.1 (66.4)	13.9 (57.0)	8.7 (47.7)	16.7 (62.1)
Mean daily minimum °C (°F)	2.5 (36.5)	3.2 (37.8)	6.1 (43.0)	10.4 (50.7)	15.0 (59.0)	19.2 (66.6)	23.2 (73.8)	24.0 (75.2)	20.9 (69.6)	15.3 (59.5)	9.7 (49.5)	4.5 (40.1)	12.8 (55.1)
Record low °C (°F)	−5.0 (23.0)	−5.5 (22.1)	−3.5 (25.7)	1.3 (34.3)	5.1 (41.2)	11.5 (52.7)	15.6 (60.1)	17.0 (62.6)	13.0 (55.4)	5.4 (41.7)	0.7 (33.3)	−3.4 (25.9)	−5.5 (22.1)
Average precipitation mm (inches)	62.3 (2.45)	70.9 (2.79)	116.2 (4.57)	136.8 (5.39)	178.8 (7.04)	333.3 (13.12)	282.7 (11.13)	247.2 (9.73)	338.6 (13.33)	200.6 (7.90)	104.1 (4.10)	60.1 (2.37)	2,118.9 (83.42)
Average precipitation days (≥ 1.0 mm)	5.3	7.2	9.6	9.8	10.1	14.5	12.1	11.0	11.3	7.5	7.0	5.2	110.6
Mean monthly sunshine hours	156.0	149.6	170.5	186.8	191.9	134.4	191.4	207.9	159.3	170.0	152.3	156.1	2,026.2
Source: Japan Meteorological Agency

Climate data for Ume, Saiki (1991−2020 normals, extremes 1977−present)
Month	Jan	Feb	Mar	Apr	May	Jun	Jul	Aug	Sep	Oct	Nov	Dec	Year
Record high °C (°F)	21.7 (71.1)	24.2 (75.6)	30.3 (86.5)	31.5 (88.7)	34.0 (93.2)	34.8 (94.6)	38.5 (101.3)	38.1 (100.6)	34.9 (94.8)	32.9 (91.2)	28.0 (82.4)	23.8 (74.8)	38.5 (101.3)
Mean daily maximum °C (°F)	10.4 (50.7)	11.8 (53.2)	15.2 (59.4)	20.3 (68.5)	24.5 (76.1)	26.4 (79.5)	30.7 (87.3)	31.3 (88.3)	27.6 (81.7)	22.9 (73.2)	17.7 (63.9)	12.5 (54.5)	20.9 (69.7)
Daily mean °C (°F)	3.9 (39.0)	5.0 (41.0)	8.3 (46.9)	13.2 (55.8)	17.7 (63.9)	21.2 (70.2)	25.2 (77.4)	25.6 (78.1)	22.1 (71.8)	16.5 (61.7)	10.9 (51.6)	5.6 (42.1)	14.6 (58.3)
Mean daily minimum °C (°F)	−1.7 (28.9)	−0.9 (30.4)	2.1 (35.8)	6.6 (43.9)	11.8 (53.2)	17.2 (63.0)	21.4 (70.5)	21.9 (71.4)	18.1 (64.6)	11.5 (52.7)	5.3 (41.5)	0.0 (32.0)	9.4 (49.0)
Record low °C (°F)	−10.5 (13.1)	−10.5 (13.1)	−8.9 (16.0)	−4.8 (23.4)	−1.0 (30.2)	6.1 (43.0)	11.5 (52.7)	13.4 (56.1)	4.2 (39.6)	−0.2 (31.6)	−4.4 (24.1)	−9.4 (15.1)	−10.5 (13.1)
Average precipitation mm (inches)	55.4 (2.18)	69.6 (2.74)	121.9 (4.80)	142.0 (5.59)	186.7 (7.35)	368.9 (14.52)	327.2 (12.88)	347.9 (13.70)	420.1 (16.54)	198.0 (7.80)	85.6 (3.37)	58.6 (2.31)	2,404.6 (94.67)
Average precipitation days (≥ 1.0 mm)	5.2	7.4	10.0	9.8	10.3	14.9	12.5	13.2	12.6	8.0	6.7	5.4	116
Mean monthly sunshine hours	162.1	153.0	170.1	182.0	177.2	106.8	158.3	172.2	128.8	159.1	148.2	159.0	1,873.4
Source: Japan Meteorological Agency

Climate data for Kamae, Saiki (1991−2020 normals, extremes 1977−present)
Month	Jan	Feb	Mar	Apr	May	Jun	Jul	Aug	Sep	Oct	Nov	Dec	Year
Record high °C (°F)	21.0 (69.8)	22.1 (71.8)	28.3 (82.9)	27.9 (82.2)	30.9 (87.6)	33.7 (92.7)	37.6 (99.7)	39.2 (102.6)	34.8 (94.6)	31.1 (88.0)	26.6 (79.9)	23.8 (74.8)	39.2 (102.6)
Mean daily maximum °C (°F)	11.8 (53.2)	12.8 (55.0)	15.7 (60.3)	20.1 (68.2)	23.8 (74.8)	25.8 (78.4)	29.3 (84.7)	30.9 (87.6)	28.5 (83.3)	24.1 (75.4)	19.0 (66.2)	14.0 (57.2)	21.3 (70.4)
Daily mean °C (°F)	7.9 (46.2)	8.6 (47.5)	11.6 (52.9)	15.9 (60.6)	19.7 (67.5)	22.4 (72.3)	25.8 (78.4)	27.2 (81.0)	24.8 (76.6)	20.2 (68.4)	15.1 (59.2)	10.0 (50.0)	17.4 (63.4)
Mean daily minimum °C (°F)	4.3 (39.7)	4.9 (40.8)	7.6 (45.7)	11.9 (53.4)	16.0 (60.8)	19.6 (67.3)	23.2 (73.8)	24.5 (76.1)	21.9 (71.4)	17.1 (62.8)	11.7 (53.1)	6.4 (43.5)	14.1 (57.4)
Record low °C (°F)	−5.7 (21.7)	−4.7 (23.5)	−3.4 (25.9)	2.0 (35.6)	7.4 (45.3)	11.8 (53.2)	16.4 (61.5)	17.9 (64.2)	12.4 (54.3)	5.5 (41.9)	2.0 (35.6)	−2.5 (27.5)	−5.7 (21.7)
Average precipitation mm (inches)	68.0 (2.68)	75.4 (2.97)	143.8 (5.66)	187.5 (7.38)	244.2 (9.61)	398.6 (15.69)	255.7 (10.07)	230.9 (9.09)	336.7 (13.26)	190.0 (7.48)	127.3 (5.01)	74.5 (2.93)	2,334.9 (91.93)
Average precipitation days (≥ 1.0 mm)	5.4	6.6	9.5	9.5	10.2	15.1	11.7	11.1	11.7	7.6	6.5	5.1	110
Mean monthly sunshine hours	183.2	171.0	185.5	192.4	182.4	117.1	171.5	198.9	168.0	182.7	167.3	180.4	2,110.5
Source: Japan Meteorological Agency

=== Demographics ===
Per Japanese census data, the population of Saiki in 2020 is 66,851 people. Saiki has been conducting censuses since 1920.

Historical population

Year	Pop.	±%
1920	83,016	—
1925	85,352	+2.8%
1930	87,810	+2.9%
1935	91,816	+4.6%
1940	91,168	−0.7%
1945	110,387	+21.1%
1950	115,123	+4.3%
1955	118,236	+2.7%
1960	114,262	−3.4%
1965	105,046	−8.1%
1970	96,667	−8.0%

Year	Pop.	±%
1975	96,317	−0.4%
1980	96,534	+0.2%
1985	95,907	−0.6%
1990	91,217	−4.9%
1995	88,116	−3.4%
2000	84,449	−4.2%
2005	80,297	−4.9%
2010	76,959	−4.2%
2015	72,211	−6.2%
2020	66,851	−7.4%

Saiki population statistics

== History ==
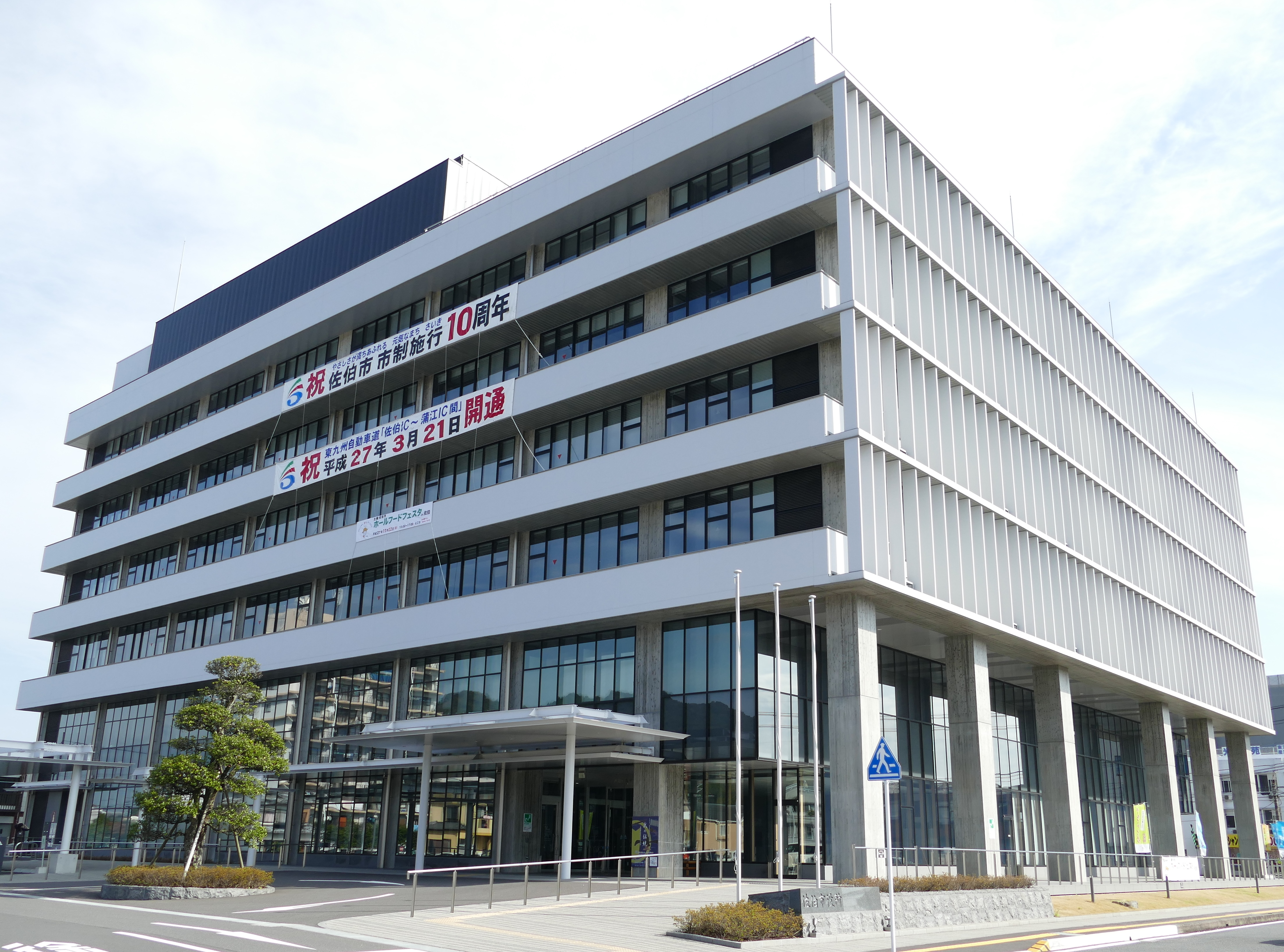
Saiki City Hall

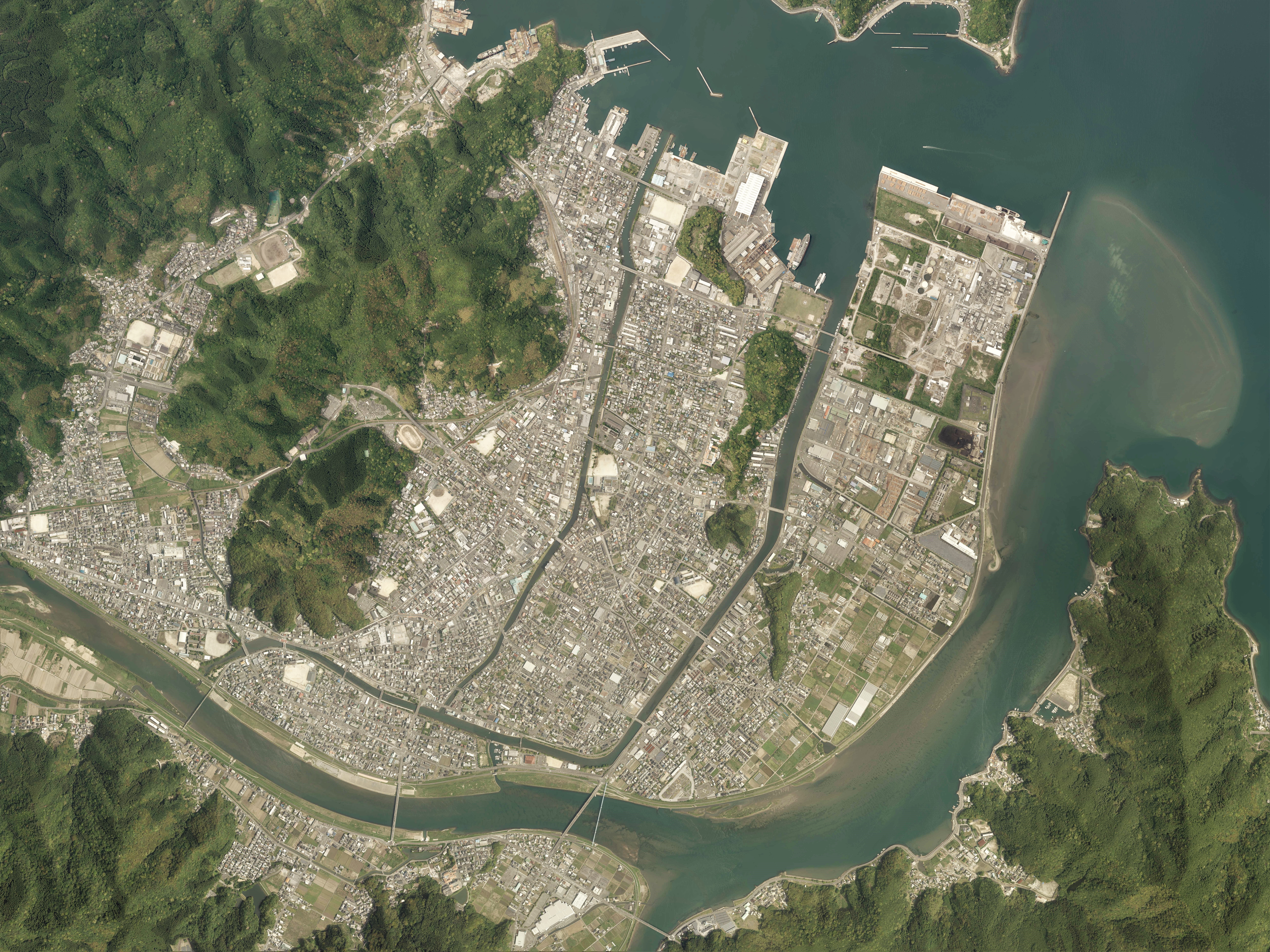
Saiki City center in 2018

The area of Saiki was part of ancient Bungo Province. Saiki began in the early Edo period as the castle town of Saiki Domain and was ruled by the Mōri clan until the Meiji restoration. (This Mōri clan was not related to the more famous Mōri clan of Chōshū Domain.) Following the Meiji restoration, the town of Saeki within Minamiamabe District, Ōita was established on May 1, 1889 with the creation of the modern municipalities system. In July 1916, the name of the town was changed from "Saeki" to "Saiki" to reflect the local dialect, with the kanji of the name remaining the same. In February 1934, the Saeki Naval Air Corps of the Imperial Japanese Navy was established in Saiki to conduct air patrols to ensure the safety of the Bungo Channel, where warships sailing from Kure Naval District located in the Seto Inland Sea exited to the Pacific Ocean. In 1937, Saiki annexed the villages of Tsuruoka and Kamikata. On April 29, 1941 - Saiki Town merged with the villages of Yahata, Oirishima, and Nishikamiura to form the city of Saiki City. Due to its military significance, the city was bombed six times during World War II. In 1955, Saiki annexed the villages of Aoyama, Shimogata and Kidachi. On Saiki merged with the neighboring towns of f Kamae, Kamiura, Tsurumi, Ume and Yayoi, and the villages Honjō, Naokawa and Yonōzu (all from Minamiamabe District) to create the new and expanded Saiki City. Minamiamabe District was dissolved as a result of this merger.

== Government ==
Saiki has a mayor-council form of government with a directly elected mayor and a unicameral city council of 25 members. Saiki contributes three members to the Ōita Prefectural Assembly. In terms of national politics, the city is part of the Ōita 2nd district of the lower house of the Diet of Japan.

== Economy ==
Saiki is a port city and a major regional commercial center.

== Education ==
Saiki has 21 public elementary schools and 12 public junior high schools operated by the city government. The city has two public high schools operated by the Ōita Prefectural Board of Education and one private high school. The prefecture operates one special education school for the handicapped.

== Transportation ==
=== Railways ===
JR Kyushu - Nippō Main Line

- Azamui - Kariu - Kaizaki - Saiki - Kamioka - Naomi - Naokawa - Shigeoka - Sōtarō

=== Highways ===
- Higashikyushu Expressway
- National Route 10
- National Route 217
- National Route 326
- National Route 388

== Sister cities ==
- Handan, China, friendship city since April 1994
- Gladstone, Queensland, Australia, sister city since September 1996
- Honolulu, Hawaii, United States, friendship city since December 2003

== Local attractions ==
- Saiki Castle - A castle ruin, a National Historic Site and one of the Continued Top 100 Japanese Castles.
- Saiki Chuo Hospital Stadium - During the 2002 World Cup, Saiki was the base camp for the Tunisia national football team.
- Fukashima (深島) is one of Japan's cat islands.
- Yayoi Roadside Station is a roadside station on National Route 10 located in Yayoi, Saiki City, Oita Prefecture.

== Noted people from Saiki ==
- Nobuko Iwaki, politician
- Masatsugu Ono, author
- Riki Takeuchi, actor
