= Sakanoichi =

- City
- Country: Japan
- Region: Kyūshū
- Prefecture: Ōita Prefecture

Population (2017)
  - Total: 19,119
- Time zone: UTC+09:00 (JST)

Sakanoichi (坂ノ市) is a suburb of the city of Ōita in Oita-ken, Japan, located to the southeast of the city.

== Population ==
According to 2017 data, Sakanoichi has a population of 19,119 in 6,053 households. Although Sakanoichi is a bedroom community for jobs in populous cities like Saiki, Saganoseki, Usuki, and Oita, 28.9% of its population is 60 years old or above. Some of the elderly residents of Sakanoichi farm rice and vegetables in the area; the community is particularly well known throughout the prefecture for its garlic chives and perilla.
