= Saiki Station =

Railway station in Saiki, Ōita Prefecture, Japan

Saiki Station 佐伯駅
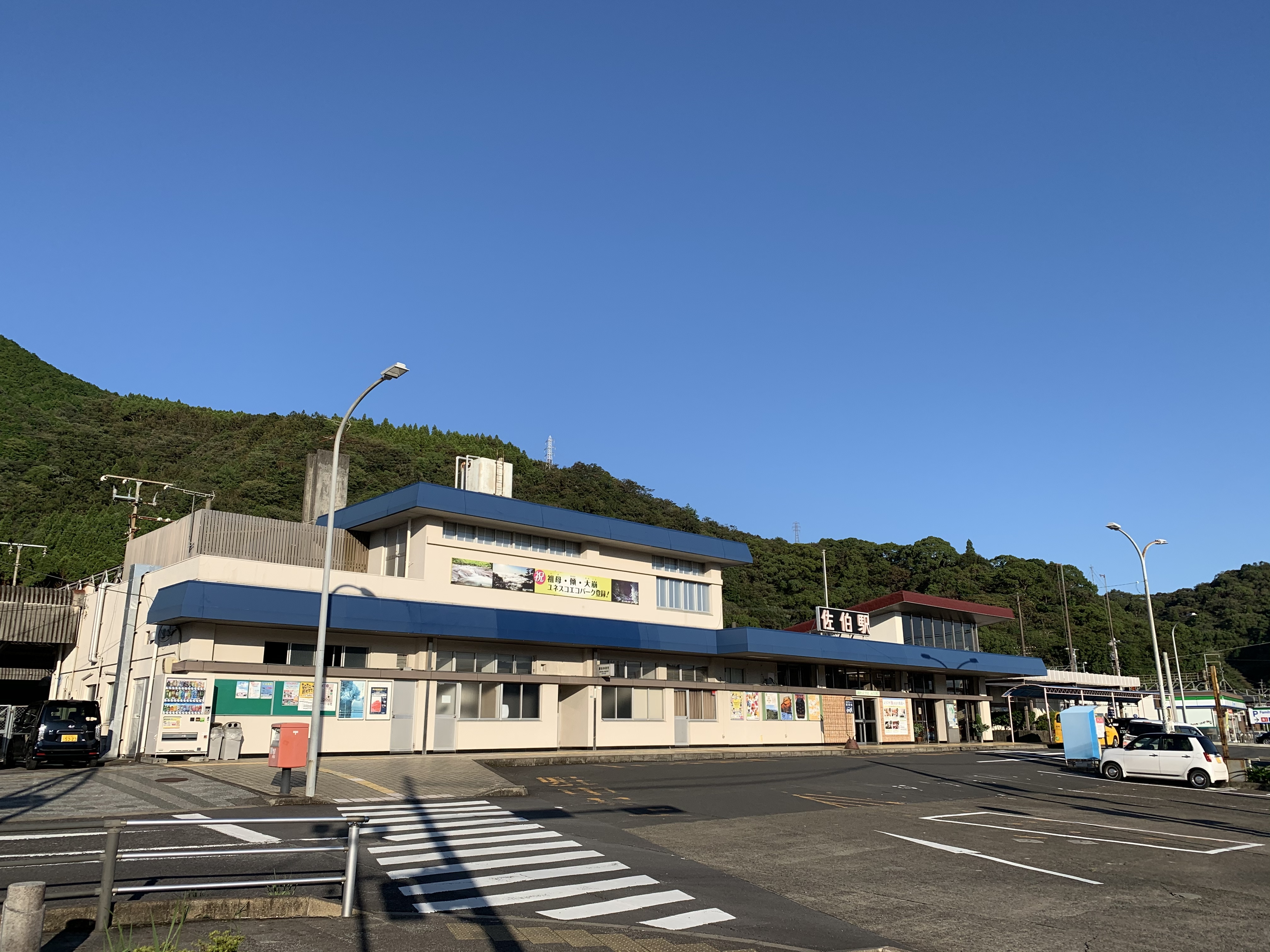
- Saiki Station in 2020

General information
- Location: 6 Hiranomachi, Saiki-shi, Ōita-ken 876-0805; Japan
- Coordinates: 32°58′20.63″N 131°54′6.53″E
- Operator: JR Kyushu
- Line: ■ Nippō Main Line
- Distance: 197.8 km from Kokura
- Platforms: 1 side + 1 island platform
- Tracks: 3 + multiple sidings

Construction
- Structure type: At grade
- Accessible: No - platforms linked by footbridge

Other information
- Status: Staffed ticket window (Midori no Madoguchi)
- Website: Official website

History
- Opened: 25 October 1916

Passengers
- FY2016: 805 daily
- Rank: 191st (among JR Kyushu stations)

Services
Preceding station	JR Kyushu	Following station
Kamioka towards Kagoshima	Nippō Main Line	Kaizaki towards Kokura
Location
- Location within Oita Prefecture Location within Japan

Saiki Station (佐伯駅, Saiki-eki) is a passenger railway station located in the city of Saiki, Ōita, Japan. It is operated by JR Kyushu.

== Lines ==
The station is served by the Nippō Main Line and is located 197.8 km from the starting point of the line at Kokura.

== Layout ==
The station has a side platform and an island platform serving three tracks at grade. Multiple sidings run to the south of platform 3. The station building is a modern two-storey concrete structure which houses a waiting area, kiosks and a staffed ticket window with a Midori no Madoguchi facility. Access to the island platform is by means of a footbridge.

=== Platforms ===
1	■ ■ Nippō Main Line	for Nobeoka and Miyazaki for Ōita, Beppu and Kokura
2	■ ■ Nippō Main Line	No scheduled train departures/arrivals
3	■ ■ Nippō Main Line	for Shigeoka for Ōita, Beppu and Kokura

== History ==
The private Kyushu Railway had, by 1909, through acquisition and its own expansion, established a track from Kokura to Yanagigaura. The Kyushu Railway was nationalised on 1 July 1907. Japanese Government Railways (JGR), designated the track as the Hōshū Main Line on 12 October 1909 and expanded it southwards in phases, with Saiki opening as the new southern terminus on 25 October 1916. It became a through-station on 20 November 1920 when the track was extended further south to Gōnohara (today Naokawa). On 15 December 1923, the Hōshū Main Line was renamed the Nippō Main Line. On 15 January 1962, the reading of the station name was changed from "Saeki" to "Saiki" with no change to the kanji characters. With the privatization of Japanese National Railways (JNR), the successor of JGR, on 1 April 1987, the station came under the control of JR Kyushu.

On 17 September 2017, Typhoon Talim (Typhoon 18) damaged the Nippō Main Line at several locations. Services between Usuki and Saiki were suspended. Rail services were restored on 18 December 2017. However JR Kyushu reported that recovery work was difficult at the site of the Tokūra Signal Box between Usuki and Tsukumi which had been covered by a landslide. Of the two tracks there, only one would be restored. According to JR Kyushu, having only a single track there (effectively closing down the signal box) would not have a large impact on its timetables and believed that it amounted to a full restoration of service.

== Passenger statistics ==
In fiscal 2016, the station was used by an average of 805 passengers daily (boarding passengers only), and it ranked 191st among the busiest stations of JR Kyushu.

== Surrounding area ==
- Saiki Port
- Oita District Court Saiki Branch
- Nippon Bunri University High School
- Oita Prefectural Saiki Tsurujo High School
- Saiki Castle

== See also ==
- List of railway stations in Japan
