= ReLIFE =

Japanese manga series

- Cover of the first Japanese volume

リライフ (Riraifu)
- Genre: Romantic drama, slice of life
- Manga
- Written by: Sō Yayoi
- Published by: NHN Japan (online); Earth Star Entertainment
- Imprint: Earth Star Comics
- Magazine: Comico Japan
- Original run: October 12, 2013 – March 16, 2018
- Volumes: 15
- Anime television series
- Directed by: Satoru Kosaka
- Produced by: Akihito Watanabe; Daisuke Kawabe; Kazuki Adachi; Saya Fukita; Yuka Asano; Yuki Matsushima
- Written by: Michiko Yokote; Kazuho Hyōdō
- Music by: Masayasu Tsuboguchi
- Studio: TMS Entertainment; Double Eagle
- Licensed by: Crunchyroll (expired): NA: AnimEigo
- Original network: Tokyo MX, GYT, GTV, BS11, AT-X
- Original run: July 2, 2016 – September 24, 2016
- Episodes: 13
- Original video animation

Kanketsu-hen
- Directed by: Satoru Kosaka
- Produced by: Akihito Watanabe; Daisuke Kawabe; Kazuki Adachi; Saya Fukita; Yuka Asano; Yuki Matsushima; Satoshi Taira
- Written by: Kazuho Hyōdō
- Music by: Masayasu Tsuboguchi
- Studio: TMS Entertainment; Double Eagle
- Licensed by: Crunchyroll (expired): NA: AnimEigo
- Released: March 21, 2018
- Runtime: 24 minutes
- Episodes: 4
- Live-action film
- ReLIFE (film)

ReLIFE (リライフ, Riraifu) is a Japanese manga series in webtoon format written and illustrated by Yayoiso. The individual chapters were released by NHN Japan on the Comico website from October 12, 2013, to March 16, 2018, for a total of 15 compiled tankōbon volumes published by Earth Star Entertainment. An anime television series adaptation animated by TMS Entertainment was announced on February 13, 2015, and premiered on television on July 2, 2016. A live action film adaptation of the same name was released in 2017. In 2017, the manga won in France's Mangawa Award.

== Plot ==
The story revolves around 27-year-old Arata Kaizaki, who works part-time at a convenience store after quitting his job at a black company. One day, a mysterious man named Ryō Yoake offers him a job opportunity. At first glance, Arata needs to become a test subject for the ReLIFE Experiment, which will make him appear to be ten years younger, and enroll as a third-year high school student. The ReLIFE Experiment is supposed to provide a chance to experience youth once again and fix whatever is wrong with the test subject's life in the process.

== Characters ==
Arata Kaizaki (海崎 新太, Kaizaki Arata)
Voiced by: Kenshō Ono (Japanese); Micah Solusod (English)
Played by: Taishi Nakagawa
Arata is a 27-year-old man who became unemployed after quitting his job of three months at a black company, claiming the reason was "it did not fit his highest potential". After several failed job interviews with other companies, usually because he got nervous when asked why he would leave a job after only three months. He ended up working part-time at a convenience store where he was scouted by Ryo Yoake who chose him for the ReLIFE Project. As a junior at high school who only appears to be a 17-year-old boy, Arata is predictably seen as mature by his classmates and has no problem easily making friends. He has forgotten most of his high school lessons, so he needs to take many remedial tests. He prevents himself from falling in love due to his biological age and the after-effect of the pill he must take after the experiment ends, even though Ryō encourages him to "live the ReLIFE to its finest". He is currently the Project #002 from Kanto Prefecture.
He actually graduated from college and started working in the black company. His female superior, Michiru, was being harassed by her male co-workers. He tried to help her, but it only increased the harassment, leading to Michiru rejecting his help and eventually committing suicide. This tragedy left him traumatized and he subsequently quit his job. At the end of the manga, he is given a job at ReLIFE Laboratory's Support Division and starts a relationship with Chizuru after learning she was a subject too. His surname comes from Kaizaki Station.
Chizuru Hishiro (日代 千鶴, Hishiro Chizuru)
Voiced by: Ai Kayano (Japanese); Jeannie Tirado (English)
Played by: Yuna Taira
A very smart but socially awkward classmate of Arata. She usually scores the top grades in her year, which makes her the class representative and has all her school expenses paid for as a result. She is not only socially awkward but also fairly ignorant with regards to anything not directly related to school matters, particularly social and emotional ones. She is always doing research online on whatever she does not understand. It is revealed that she was a ReLIFE subject too and had two terms. She falls in love with Arata and correctly suspects that he is a subject too. At the end of the manga, she gets a job at ReLIFE Laboratory's Research and Development Division and starts a relationship with Arata. Her surname comes from Hishiro Station.
Ryō Yoake (夜明 了, Yoake Ryō)
Voiced by: Ryōhei Kimura (Japanese); Jessie James Grelle (English)
Played by: Yudai Chiba
Arata's ReLIFE supervisor, the man who offered him to be a test subject for the ReLIFE Experiment. He is the same age as Arata and always seems cheerful, which in fact irritates Kaizaki to no end. Being the supervisor, he always watches over Arata from a distance and writes reports about his daily life. Later, he starts a relationship with An. His surname comes from Yoake Station.
Rena Kariu (狩生 玲奈, Kariu Rena)
Voiced by: Haruka Tomatsu (Japanese); Alexis Tipton (English)
Played by: Elaiza Ikeda
Arata's female classmate who sits next to him and is a volleyball club member. She is very competitive, and she wants to be the best at everything. She thinks of Chizuru and Honoka as her rivals, but is on good terms with them. Rena is stubborn and proud, but actually genuinely confused inside. She has crush on Kazuomi and acts like a tsundere towards him. Later, she and Kazuomi become a couple. Her surname comes from Kariu Station.
Kazuomi Ōga (大神 和臣, Ōga Kazuomi)
Voiced by: Yūma Uchida (Japanese); Blake Shepard (English)
Played by: Mahiro Takasugi
Arata's classmate who is the class representative along with Chizuru. He performs well academically but has very poor athleticism. He lacks social prowess when it comes to romance. With the help of Arata and their friends, he realizes his feelings for Rena, claiming that he wants to be with her and does not want her to be with another guy. He wears his uniform in a particularly eye-catching way, earning him the nickname "Flashy Ōga" (チャラオーガ, Chara-Ōga) or just "Flashy Blond Guy". His surname comes from Ōga Station. His older brother was once a cheerful man who became a NEET due to heavy pressure and later is chosen to take part in the ReLIFE program as Project #005 by Arata in the last chapter ch222.
An Onoya (小野屋 杏, Onoya An)
Voiced by: Reina Ueda (Japanese); Kristen McGuire (English)
Played by: Sae Okazaki
An is another "transfer student" at Aoba High School. But she is actually Ryō's junior supervisor and the one who scouted Arata for the ReLIFE Experiment. Like Ryō, she acts cheerfully and together with watching their project to the point it becomes stalking, much to Arata's annoyance. Later, she starts a relationship with Ryō. Her surname comes from Onoya Station.
Honoka Tamarai (玉来 ほのか, Tamarai Honoka)
Voiced by: Himika Akaneya (Japanese); Bryn Apprill (English)
Rena's best friend and the captain of the female volleyball team. She is a naive, friendly and sweet girl, and is drawn noticeably well-endowed as a running gag, as her graces earn her the envious stare of Rena. Having a strong aptitude and athletic ability, she felt pressure from people who cannot surpass her, which is why Rena's claim to be her rival makes Honoka treasure their friendship. Despite being a genius at sports, she is not very good academically, and in the everyday life often act as a airhead, missing connections even in the school-home trip, so much so that her male friends, Akira and Nobunaga, act as self- appointed chaperones and protectors. Her surname comes from Tamarai Station.
Akira Inukai (犬飼 暁, Inukai Akira)
Voiced by: Noriaki Sugiyama (Japanese); Alejandro Saab (English)
He is Honoka and Nobunaga's childhood friend. He has sharp and glaring eyes. He is very protective of Honoka and he gets mad at anyone caught leering at her. His surname comes from Inukai Station.
Nobunaga Asaji (朝地 信長, Asaji Nobunaga)
Voiced by: Daisuke Namikawa (Japanese); Stephen Sanders (English)
He is Honoka and Akira's childhood friend, he acts like the mother of the group and a member of the health committee. His surname comes from Asaji Station.
Kokoro Amatsu (天津 心, Amatsu Kokoro)
Voiced by: Miyuki Sawashiro (Japanese); Caitlin Glass (English)
Played by: Natsuna Watanabe
Arata's homeroom teacher. She is a physical education teacher and coaches the female volleyball club. Her surname comes from Amatsu Station.
Kōshi Usa (宇佐 浩史, Usa Kōshi)
Voiced by: Wataru Hatano (Japanese); Anthony Bowling (English)
The male volleyball supervisor and a physical education teacher. He was Kokoro's senior at university and they are sort of rivals. His surname comes from Usa Station.
Sumire Inukai (犬飼 すみれ, Inukai Sumire)
Voiced by: Ryōko Shiraishi (Japanese); Marissa Lenti (English)
The Public health doctor of Aoba Academy. She is also Akira's older sister. Her surname comes from Inukai Station.
Michiru Saiki (佐伯 みちる, Saiki Michiru)
Voiced by: Shizuka Itō (Japanese); Alex Moore (English)
She was Arata's superior at the black company. She later committed suicide after being harassed by her coworkers. Her suicide had a great impact on Arata, rendering him unable to function in society. Her surname comes from Saiki Station.

== Media ==
=== Manga ===
The manga began publication on the Comico app in 2013 with physical publication of the series following in 2014. The series was added to the Crunchyroll Manga service on December 21, 2015. On March 5, 2018, Crunchyroll removed the series.

Several new chapters were also published by Yayoiso but are not for sale on Amazon. These episodes are available as online reader on the Comico official website. An English translation is also available for this manga on Comico's English website Pocket Comics. The last Report is 222 Named: "Restart Life". In volume 15, two bonus chapters, were added. The first is an epilogue. It picks up the same night Chizuru and Arata regain their memories of each other, and ends just over four years later. The other bonus chapter was a prologue, which covers how Arata was chosen to be a subject.

No.	Japanese release date	Japanese ISBN
1	August 12, 2014	978-4-8030-0595-0
1. "Arata Kaizaki (27), Unemployed"; 2. "Pathetic"; 3. "Test Subject"; 4. "Weirdo"; 5. "Contract Complete"; 6. "Can't Calm Down"; 7. "Generation Gap"; 8. "Thrilling Student Life"; 9. "Different Habits"; 10. "Insulting, But..."; 11. "Getting Involved"; 12. "The Support Division's Job"; 13. "Easy Life"; 14. "Unexpected and Unintended"; 15. "Long Day"; 16. "Now That I'm Older Than My Teacher"; 17. "Communication Stat: 0"; 18. "Well Said"; 19. "Essays for All"; 19.5. "Bonus Report"
2	November 12, 2014	978-4-8030-0619-3
20. "Seriously Weird"; 21. "Heaven and Hell"; 22. "Naturally"; 23. "Pure-Hearted Oga"; 24. "Distance Dilemma"; 25. "Work and Personal"; 26. "Not Silver"; 27. "Average Results"; 28. "Second"; 29. "One Way"; 30. "Aoba High Class 3-3"; 31. "Ties to Deepen, Deepening Misunderstandings"; 32. "At Lunch"; 33. "Bogged Down or Isolated"; 34. "Adult Perspective"; 35. "Black"; 36. "Fallen"; 37. "The Fall"
3	March 28, 2015	978-4-8030-0690-2
38. "Overlap"; 39. "Rupture"; 40. "I've Been Waiting"; 41. "The Answer"; 42. "Don't Run"; 43. "Smile"; 44. "Reality≠Right"; 45. "Golden Week"; 46. "Excuse Us"; 47. "Casual"; 48. "Good Intentions"; 49. "Just the Two of Us + 1"; 50. "Not Our First Time"; 51. "Legal High School Girl?"; 52. "Once Again, Kaizaki-kun"; 52.5. "Senpai, Kōhai, Classmate"
4	August 12, 2015	978-4-8030-0757-2
53. "I'm Not Kidding"; 54. "Aligning Answers"; 55. "Distance Dilemma 2"; 56. "Love and Friendship"; 57. "Teacher's Room, After School"; 58. "Weak but Strong"; 59. "Earnest but Awkward"; 60. "Stong-Willed Hard Worker"; 61. "Before the Storm"; 62. "Rash Emotions"; 63. "Accident Caused"; 64. "Turn Back Time"; 65. "Hishiron the Oblivious"; 66. "Corrosion"; 67. "Around the Rift"; 68. "I Hate Girls Like That"; 68.5. "Dull Silver"
5	February 12, 2016	978-4-8030-0861-6
69. "Disturbance"; 70. "Hello"; 71. "Last Year's Trauma"; 72. "Revenge"; 73. "A Step Forward, Together"; 74. "Assembly"; 75. "Honoka's Feelings"; 76. "Chizuru's Feelings"; 77. "Rena's Feelings?"; 78. "Bittersweet Crossroads"; 79. "The Final Drastic Measure"; 80. "Stubborn Idiot"; 81. "Rena's Feelings"; 82. "Follow Through"; 83. "Continued"; 83.5. "Bad Guy Hero"
6	August 12, 2016	978-4-8030-0941-5
84. "Post-Festival Peace"; 85. "How To Thank"; 86. "Anniversary"; 87. "Support My Way"; 88. "Past Trip"; 89. "Loss"; 90. "Admired Senpai"; 91. "Facing Forward"; 92. "Three-Legged Race"; 93. "Fluttering Hearts And Curiosity?"; 94. "One Semester Down!"; 95. "We're High School Boys"; 96. "Error"; 97. "Double Panic"; 97.5. "July 1st"
7	February 25, 2017	978-4-8030-0996-5
98. "Don't Touch Her"; 99. "A Normal Day With You"; 100. "Last In School And First And Last"; 101. "Feeling Red"; 102. "Looking Good Together"; 103. "Confession...?"; 104. "Fleeting Flowers"; 105. "Starting Without Mood"; 106. "Very Sweet"; 107. "Reflections"; 108. "Even If It Is A Legal High School Girl"; 109. "18 Again"; 110. "Shift"; 111. "Critical Straight"; 111.5. "Happy Birthday"
8	May 11, 2018	978-4-8030-1186-9
9	August 10, 2018	978-4-8030-1218-7
10	November 12, 2018	978-4-8030-1247-7
11	February 12, 2019	978-4-8030-1269-9
12	May 11, 2019	978-4-8030-1295-8
222. "Restart Life"

=== Anime ===
Trailer for the original video animation (OVA)

It was announced on February 13, 2015, that the webtoon series would be getting an anime television adaptation that is scheduled to air on July 2, 2016. The anime's main cast, broadcast information and first key visual was unveiled at the AnimeJapan 2016 convention in Japan on March 26, 2016. TMS Entertainment produced the series, with Satoru Kosaka directing, Michiko Yokote and Kazuho Hyodo handling series composition, Junko Yamanaka designing the characters, and Masayasu Tsuboguchi composing the music. All 13 episodes of the anime were pre-streamed before the television broadcast on the ReLIFE Channel app on June 24, 2016. Crunchyroll released all episodes of the anime for premium members on July 1, 2016; each episode was made available for free members throughout the following weeks. Funimation released it on home video with an English dub.

A four-episode finale was streamed on Amazon Prime Video and released on Blu-ray & DVD on March 21, 2018.

On July 31, 2026, following the expiration of Crunchyroll's license, AnimEigo announced they had rescued the anime series and planned to release on Blu-ray in unknown date.

==== Episode list ====
No.	Title	Original air date
1	"Kaizaki Arata (27) Unemployed"; Transliteration: "Kaizaki Arata (27) mushoku" (Japanese: 海崎新太（27）無職)	July 2, 2016
Arata Kaizaki is a 27-year-old NEET who is unable to find stable work. After getting drunk one night, Arata meets an employee from ReLIFE Laboratory's Support Division named Ryō Yoake, who selects him as a test subject for the ReLIFE Experiment for one year in exchange for covering all his living expenses. Upon accepting, Arata soon learns that the ReLIFE Experiment involves him taking a blue pill that makes him appear to be 17 years old again, and enrolling as a junior at Aoba High School starting in the spring. During homeroom class, Arata makes a bad first impression when homeroom teacher Kokoro Amatsu confiscates a pack of cigarettes from his backpack before proctoring tests on Japanese, math and English. In the staff room, Kokoro urges Arata to complete and submit an apology letter by the next day. After school, Arata is shocked to find out that Ryō also took the blue pill in order to quietly supervise Arata. Ryō explains that the ReLIFE Experiment is an opportunity for Arata to relive his youth in an attempt to change his current self.
2	"Communication Skills: Zero"; Transliteration: "Komyunikēshon nōryoku 0-ten" (Japanese: コミュニケーション能力0点)	July 9, 2016
Based on the results of the three tests, Kokoro assigns Kazuomi Ōga and Chizuru Hishiro as the male and female class representatives. After deducing that Rena Kariu is jealous about Chizuru being assigned the female class representative, Arata is surprised that An Onoya failed the three tests like he did. During lunch, Kazuomi tells Arata and An that he previously gave an earring to Rena out of gratitude. Upon learning that Chizuru did not bring lunch money to buy some ramen, Arata offers to loan her a 1000 yen note, but he is thrown for a loop by her blunt response. When Arata prepares to submit his apology letter in the staff room, he runs into Chizuru, who admits that she lacks social skills, let alone crack a normal smile. As Chizuru wishes to improve herself, Arata motivates her to smile more often. They soon befriend each other after exchanging phone numbers. In the evening, Ryō encourages Arata to quit smoking. Soon after, Chizuru sends a text message to Arata, sincerely promising to pay back her loan.
3	"You're Old Now"; Transliteration: "Ossan nan desukara" (Japanese: オッサンなんですから)	July 16, 2016
In the morning, Arata learns that Chizuru paid back her loan in a comical way. Before going with Kazuomi to the staff room, Chizuru cracks a forced smile in front of Rena, who misinterprets this as a mocking smirk. During physical education class in the school track and field, Kokoro coaches the female students while her colleague Kōshi Usa coaches the male students. Nobunaga Asaji and Akira Inukai each throws a weighted ball at a far distance. However, Kazuomi proves to be unathletic, while Arata accidentally sprains his shoulder. Rena and An run very fast during a 50-meter dash, though Honoka Tamarai proves to be the most athletic. Previously perceiving Chizuru as an academic rival, Rena learns that Chizuru never knew her. Chizuru convinces Rena to record her time with a stopwatch during the 50-meter dash. Arata then sprains his knee during the 50-meter dash, having to be embarrassingly carried by Nobunaga to the school infirmary. The next morning, Arata and Chizuru walk to school together, as Rena notices that Chizuru seems to smile normally around Arata.
4	"Fall"; Transliteration: "Ochiru" (Japanese: 墜ちる)	July 23, 2016
Greatly affecting her self-esteem, Rena angrily continues to misperceive Chizuru's forced smile as a mischievous condescending smirk and begrudgingly continues to view Honoka's athleticism as a threat despite being her best friend. When Arata, Kazuomi and An notice that Chizuru sits alone in the school cafeteria, Arata realizes that Rena is glaring at Chizuru nearby. In the evening, Chizuru sends a text message to Arata, explaining her apparent belief of getting along with Rena. Arata seeks advice from Ryō, who suggests that Arata should not try the fix the problems of his peers. While Chizuru and Kazuomi attend a meeting in the staff room after class, Rena and Honoka have volleyball practice in the school gymnasium. Late in the afternoon, Nobunaga and Akira arrive to pack up the volleyballs and walk Honoka home. It is revealed that Rena was the female class representative alongside Kazuomi during freshman year before being replaced by Chizuru since sophomore year. Rena returns the school gymnasium key inside the staff room before stealing Chizuru's school bag left behind outside the staff room. Having stayed late after school to study, Arata catches Rena in the act, though they end up falling down a flight of stairs.
5	"Overlap"; Transliteration: "Ōbārappu" (Japanese: オーバーラップ)	July 30, 2016
In the school infirmary, school nurse and Akira's older sister Sumire Inukai leaves after seeing that Arata has awakened while Rena remains asleep. Arata recalls when he was employed at a black company, where his superior Michiru Saiki was bullied by her envious coworkers. When Rena awakens, Arata confronts her for attempting to steal Chizuru's school bag. Although Rena admits feeling insecure because she is surpassed by Honoka athletically and Chizuru academically, Arata encourages Rena to continue working hard. At the school gate, Arata eventually informs Chizuru that Rena attempted to steal her school bag in order to mess with her. Chizuru decides to have a talk with Rena when she approaches the school gate. As Arata and Ryō eavesdrop in the bushes, Rena realizes that Chizuru cannot crack a normal smile when forced to do so, while Chizuru clears up the confusion by admitting that she is trying to improve on her lack of social skills. Rena apologies for her actions after agreeing to be friends with Chizuru on the condition that the latter acknowledges the former as a rival. The next day, Rena and Honoka sit with Chizuru in the school cafeteria.
6	"This Isn't the First Time"; Transliteration: "Hajimemashite janainda yo" (Japanese: 初めましてじゃないんだよ)	August 6, 2016
During Golden Week, Arata frantically stashes away his beer and cigarettes before letting Kazuomi and An inside his apartment for a study session. After Kazuomi leaves early to cover a work shift at a convenience store, An grills Arata about a job interview that he wrote down on his calendar. Meanwhile, Ryō remotely hacks Arata's cellphone, rushing off to Arata's apartment after learning that Arata is alone with An. When An suspects that Arata formerly worked part-time at the convenience store, she confesses that she fell in love with him at first sight. Arata stops An from leaning in for a kiss just as Ryō arrives. Ryō scolds An for her actions, though An admits that she was merely testing Arata. It is revealed that An is Ryō's coworker from ReLIFE Laboratory's Support Division. An also explains that she was originally assigned as Arata's supervisor, but Ryō had to take over the position since An was unable to complete her training in time. While An apologizes for causing so much trouble, Ryō hopes that Arata will continue being a test subject. Ryō internally begs for forgiveness since the explanation was actually a half-truth.
7	"Test Subject 001 → 002"; Transliteration: "Hikensha 001→002" (Japanese: 被験者001→002)	August 13, 2016
While logging his report on how Arata has progressed in the ReLIFE Experiment, Ryō recalls when he was assigned to supervise his first test subject. In the past, Ryō had to remain neutral after being scolded by the higher-ups for being too involved with the first test subject. Passing by the convenience store, Ryō scouted out Arata to potentially be the second test subject for the ReLIFE Experiment. Ryō was discouraged when the first test subject was deemed a failure, having made no progress after a year had passed. Fortunately, An informed Ryō that Arata was successfully selected to be the second test subject, and Ryō was assigned to be Arata's supervisor. Ryō visited Kento Amagase from ReLIFE Laboratory's Research and Development Division in order to fill a prescription for Arata. After quitting his part-time job at the convenience store, Arata took the blue pill in front of Ryō. In the present, Ryō concludes his report by logging that Arata has shown remorse for each mistake and attempts to improve, noting that Arata is gradually having an influence on his peers.
8	"Rift"; Transliteration: "Kiretsu" (Japanese: 亀裂)	August 20, 2016
Regarding the midterm exams, Arata still fails while An finally passes. In the staff room after class, both Arata and Honoka meet with Kokoro, who encourages them to pass their next makeup exam. However, Honoka has more pressure to pass her makeup exam since she is the captain of the girls' volleyball team. While walking Honoka to the school gymnasium for volleyball practice and then meeting up with Chizuru in the classroom, Arata finds it funny when they assume that Kazuomi is attracted to An instead of Rena. Honoka later overhears gossip about her outside the girls' locker room, though Rena soon storms inside and vouches for Honoka. In the evening, Sumire provides snacks as Akira tutors Honoka for her makeup exam. The next day after school, Sumire informs that Honoka passed while Arata failed yet again. During volleyball practice, Honoka faints while knocking over the cart full of volleyballs due to studying all night long. Unfortunately, Rena trips over a dropped volleyball and sprains her ankle. This sparks a rift between Rena and Honoka.
9	"Revenge"; Transliteration: "Ribenji" (Japanese: リベンジ)	August 27, 2016
Honoka invites Chizuru to sit with her in the school cafeteria, though Chizuru notices that Rena is absent from class. A limping Rena tells Kokoro that she plans on quitting the girls' volleyball team before an upcoming girls' volleyball tournament. Arata cleverly leaves Rena alone with Kazuomi after school. Although hesitant at first, Rena allows Kazuomi to walk her home. Suspecting that Rena and Honoka no longer speak to each other, Chizuru visits Arata at his apartment and seeks his advice. While Ryō and An remotely hack Arata's cellphone to eavesdrop, Chizuru explains that a female student had to transfer schools last year after being targeted by bullies, while Arata recalls that Michiru committed suicide after going through a similar situation. Inside the girls' locker room, Honoka bears her guilt to Arata and Chizuru. Having overheard Honoka from the outside, Akira and Nobunaga bring Rena and Kazuomi with them to listen in on this private discussion, as Honoka reveals that she never planned on joining the girls' volleyball team in the first place.
10	"Everybody's Selfish Desires"; Transliteration: "Minna no wagamama" (Japanese: みんなのワガママ)	September 3, 2016
Honoka explains that she originally wanted to fly under the radar when she enrolled in Aoba High School, but she quickly befriended Rena, who told her not to hold back her athleticism. As Chizuru reveals that she was unable to keep friends due to transferring schools numerous times throughout her childhood, Chizuru motivates Honoka to have a talk with Rena and salvage their friendship. Arata, Chizuru and Honoka find Rena, Kazuomi, Akira and Nobunaga waiting outside the girls' locker room. Rena runs away before Honoka says her peace, though Kazuomi reassures Honoka that Rena will come around soon. When Rena is a no-show for the girls' volleyball tournament, Arata and Chizuru leave Kazuomi, Akira and Nobunaga at the school gymnasium and go to Rena's apartment. Rena is already dressed for the girls' volleyball tournament, but she denies wanting to participate. Chizuru desires for Rena to play in the girls' volleyball tournament and reconcile with Honoka. Back at the school gymnasium, Rena and Honoka reconcile before the gameplay resumes. Although Rena and Honoka lose against the opposing team, they thank Chizuru for mending their friendship.
11	"A Trip to the Past"; Transliteration: "Kako torippu" (Japanese: 過去トリップ)	September 10, 2016
Planning to visit Michiru's grave, Arata agrees to take a red pill that will temporarily restore his biological appearance on the condition that Ryō will accompany him by train to the cemetery. Arata reminisces about his past, recalling that Michiru committed suicide after she was bullied by envious coworkers. Having been surrounded by heartless people, Arata ended up quitting his job after working three months at the black company. In the present, Arata and Ryō run into Zen Kamioka and Rumi Naomi, who were hired at the black company a year after Arata resigned. Zen and Rumi admire Arata for quitting his job, something that no other employee had the guts to do. Arata vaguely states that he is in a better place after having found temporary work. On the train ride home, Arata tells Ryō that he did not want to give the false hope of finding a stable job. Unbeknownst to Arata, Ryō previously tasked An to arrange the seemingly spontaneous encounter with Zen and Rumi at Michiru's grave, which allowed Arata to finally gain some closure.
12	"Double Panic"; Transliteration: "Daburu panikku" (Japanese: ダブルパニック)	September 17, 2016
While walking to school together, Arata and Chizuru briefly run into An and Ryō on the way there. With summer vacation around the corner, Kazuomi plans on taking summer classes to prep for college entrance exams. After school, Arata, Ryō and An hang out at Arata's apartment, where they discuss that Kazuomi is still oblivious to Rena having feelings for him. The next day at school, Arata explains to Kazuomi about the importance of a relationship. As they walk home from school, Arata and Kazuomi witness Rena talking to Zen. Kazuomi comes out of hiding, as he learns that Zen was trying to help Rena after she had a case of heat stroke. Rena and Kazuomi then walk home together. The following day at school, Kazuomi confides in Arata that he finally realizes his feelings for Rena. Seeking advice from Arata as well as Chizuru, Ryō and An, Kazuomi takes everything in consideration. Kazuomi ultimately decides to invite Rena to the fireworks festival and confess his feelings to her. After Kazuomi invites Rena to the fireworks festival via text message, Rena seeks advice from Honoka and Chizuru, who were also invited by Kazuomi.
13	"Confession"; Transliteration: "Kokuhaku" (Japanese: 告白)	September 24, 2016
Rena wants to be alone with Kazuomi during the fireworks festival so she can confess her feelings to him. During the fireworks festival, Arata, Chizuru, Ryō, An, Honoka, Akira and Nobunaga arrange for Rena and Kazuomi to be alone. Rena and Kazuomi finally confess their feelings to each other. Ryō and An also arrange for Arata and Chizuru to be alone. As the fireworks begin, Chizuru tells Arata that she is really glad to meet him. Chizuru briefly recalls when she was selected by Ryō to be the first test subject of the ReLIFE Experiment one year ago. After the fireworks festival, everyone goes their separate ways. While sitting on a park bench, Arata realizes his feelings for Chizuru, though he decides not to confess his feelings to her since all of his peers will forget him after he completes the ReLIFE Experiment. As they walk home together, Arata and Chizuru vow never to forget each other. After informing An that she will be Chizuru's supervisor starting next semester, Ryō documents that Arata causes profound change to those around him due to his impulse to care and his willingness to help as he is able to heal the scars of his past.
14 (OVA 1)	"Seed"	March 21, 2018
When the new semester begins, Rena is assigned as the female class representative this time, believing that Chizuru held back academically. After Rena and Honoka mention that Chizuru may have feelings for Arata, Chizuru later asks Ryō if Arata is a test subject of the ReLIFE Experiment. Neither confirming nor denying, Ryō warns her that hypothetically exposing Arata as a test subject would end the ReLIFE Experiment for him, meaning that Chizuru would no longer see Arata again. At Chizuru's apartment, An reveals that she will be Chizuru's supervisor from now on. An suggests that Chizuru is suppressing her feelings for Arata due to her uncertainty of him being an adult like her. The next day, Kazuomi convinces Arata to volunteer as the boys' officer for the upcoming cultural festival, while Chizuru willingly volunteers as the girls' officer. When Kazuomi hides the fact that his older brother Takaomi Ōga recently became a shut-in after quitting his job, Arata and Chizuru advise Kazuomi to give Rena a chance to understand the situation. Arata and Chizuru then oversee preparations for the upcoming cultural festival. As Chizuru dozes off after school, Arata internally confesses his feelings for Chizuru.
15 (OVA 2)	"Need"	March 21, 2018
Arata, Chizuru, Ryō, Rena, Kazuomi, An, Honoka, Akira and Nobunaga run a maid and butler café as their theme for the cultural festival. While exploring the food booths, Arata is caught off guard when Chizuru grips his arm tightly. The cultural festival ends with a bonfire in the evening. The next day, both Arata and Chizuru select Aoba University as their college of choice during their guidance meeting with Kokoro, just as Kazuomi and Rena have done. On his way home, Arata is told by Ryō that the memories of his peers will be erased after the ReLIFE Experiment ends. Ryō and An later have a discussion revealing that Arata and Chizuru will have their memories of each other also erased. In her bed, Chizuru racks her brain over her feelings for Arata. On the following day, Arata and Chizuru each wonder if they will be remembered as they take a photo with the rest of their homeroom classmates.
16 (OVA 3)	"Date"	March 21, 2018
With Christmas right around the corner, Kazuomi suggests for Arata to ask out Chizuru on a date. However, Chizuru starts avoiding Arata all day in order to see things from a different perspective. After talking about it with Rena and Honoka during basketball practice, Chizuru decides to ask out Arata on a date by sending a text message in the evening after being too timid during lunchtime. Arata and Chizuru meet up for their date, where they visit a shopping mall. While Ryō and An keep watch nearby, Arata and Chizuru purchase phone straps for each other. On a Ferris wheel, Arata and Chizuru both wish that the moment could last longer. As they walk together, Arata blurts out that he loves Chizuru. Taken aback, Chizuru realizes that her feelings for Arata are the same. When it begins to rain, Arata and Chizuru walk back home while holding Chizuru's umbrella.
17 (OVA 4)	"Life"	March 21, 2018
On the last day of school, Kokoro's homeroom class graduates. Arata and Chizuru embrace at the school gate as they vow never to forget each other. Ryō visits Arata at his apartment and gives him a pill that will permanently restore his biological appearance, deeming the ReLIFE Experiment a complete success. Meanwhile, An does the same thing with Chizuru, but An later notices that Chizuru wrote a message on her hand with a marker, saying that she is in love with Arata. An has no choice but to erase the message in guilty conscience. Before he took the pill, Arata requested Ryō to help him apply for a job at ReLIFE Laboratory's Support Division. Arata is shown to be Takaomi's supervisor. During a corporate dinner, Arata runs into Chizuru, who is an employee at ReLIFE Laboratory's Research and Development Division. Although they do not recognize each other, they soon share the fact that they were both test subjects for the ReLIFE Experiment. Chizuru describes her experience as a test subject like fireworks. In turn, this triggers their memory of being together during the fireworks festival. With their memories now restored, Chizuru walks into Arata's waiting arms with tears of joy.

=== Music ===
The opening theme is "Button" by Penguin Research, while various artists perform a different ending theme for each episode. The ending songs are compiled into one album titled "MD2000 ~ReLIFE Ending Songs~" to be released on September 21, 2016. The title "MD2000" comes from a type of mini disc that came out in 2000 while the concept of the ending themes comes from the songs that Kaizaki used to hear back in his previous high school days.

A series of character songs also released from August 3, 2016, started with Arata Kaizaki from volume one. Each CD contains two songs with a respective instrumental version. A soundtrack CD containing 23 pieces of background music from the anime is released on September 14, 2016. The music is composed by Masayusu Tzboguchi.

==== List of Ending Songs ====
Episode	Title	Artist
1	"Iijyuu ★ Rider" (イ―ジュ－★ライダー, Iiju ★ Raida)	Tamio Okuda
2	"Hot Limit"	T.M. Revolution
3	"Timing" (タイミング～Timing～, Taimingu)	Black Biscuits
4	"Honey"	L'Arc-en-Ciel
5	"Kore ga Watashi no Ikiru Michi" (これが私の生きる道)	PUFFY
6	"Sunny Day Sunday"	Sentimental Bus
7	"Saudade" (サウダージ, Saudaji)	Porno Graffitti
8	"Yuki no Hana" (雪の華)	Mika Nakashima
9	"There will be love there -Ai no Aru Basho-" (There will be love there -愛のある場所-)	The Brilliant Green
10	"Asu e no Tobira" (明日への扉)	I Wish
11	"Pieces of A Dream"	Chemistry
12	"Natsu Matsuri" (夏祭り)	Whiteberry
14	""Hana"(花)"	Orange Range
15	"Cher.r.y"	YUI
16	"La La La Love Song"	Toshinobu Kubota
13, 17	"Button" (ボータン)	Penguin Research

==== List of Character Songs ====
Volume	Character	Voice actor	Song title	Release date	Package number
1	Arata Kaizaki	Kenshō Ono	"ReLIFE"	August 3, 2016	TMS-335
1	Arata Kaizaki	Kenshō Ono	"ReGRET"	August 3, 2016	TMS-335
2	Chizuru Hishiro	Ai Kayano	"Momoiro." (モモイロ。)	August 31, 2016	TMS-336
2	An Onoya	Reina Ueda	"ReJOIN♪"	August 31, 2016	TMS-336
3	Kazuomi Ōga	Yūma Uchida	"Berry Suite" (ベリースイート, Beri Suito)	September 27, 2016	TMS-337
3	Rena Kariu	Haruka Tomatsu	"Namida Diamond" (ナミダダイアモンド, Namida Daiamondo)	September 27, 2016	TMS-337

=== Live action film ===
A live action film adaptation of the same name and directed by Takeshi Furusawa was released in Japanese theaters on April 15, 2017. The film stars Taishi Nakagawa and Yuna Taira as Arata Kaizaki and Chizuru Hishiro, respectively. The film was given an original ending.

=== Stage play ===
A stage play adaptation was performed in Tokyo and Osaka in late 2016.

== Reception ==
Volume one reached the 30th place on the weekly Oricon manga charts and, as of August 17, 2014, had sold 33,637 copies; volume two reached the ninth place and, as of November 16, 2014, had sold 46,040 copies; volume three reached the 23rd place and, as of April 5, 2015, had sold 73,019 copies.

It was placed sixth in Zenkoku Shotenin ga Eranda Osusume Comic 2015. It was also nominated for Best General Manga at the 39th Kodansha Manga Awards. The series ranked sixth in the first Next Manga Award in the print manga category. The series had sold one million copies as of February 8, 2016. As of October 2016, the manga had been downloaded over 20 million times.
