= Harajuku Himegoto House =

Japanese mixed-media project

原宿ヒメゴトハウス (Harajuku Himegoto Hausu)
- Created by: Animate; Plott
- Anime television series
- Studio: Plott (planning and production)

Harajuku Himegoto House (原宿ヒメゴトハウス, Harajuku Himegoto Hausu) is a Japanese mixed-media project created by Animate and Plott, which launched in November 2026 with various music videos, live events and voice dramas. An anime television series has been announced.

== Characters ==
Mizuki Otokozawa (男沢ミズキ, Otokozawa Mizuki)
Voiced by: Yūya Hirose
Mero Togariishi (尖石めろ, Togariishi Mero)
Voiced by: Tetsuei Sumiya
Takara Rokurokusō (六麓荘宝, Rokurokusō Takara)
Voiced by: Sōhei Horikane
Kentarō Jinbayama (陣馬山ケンタロウ, Jinbayama Kentarō)
Voiced by: Masaru Yoshimura
Yuki Inubo (犬吠雪, Inubo Yuki)
Voiced by: Takuma Nagatsuka
Hitoshi Haritsukekawara (磔河原仁志, Haritsukekawara Hitoshi)
Voiced by: Nobuhiko Okamoto
Shō Dogenzaka (道玄坂ショウ, Dogenzaka Shō)
Voiced by: Showtaro Morikubo

== Other media ==
=== Anime ===
An anime television series was announced with the project's launch on November 7, 2026. It will be planned and produced by Plott, with Akane Aki handling original character designs.
