= Dr. Ramune: Mysterious Disease Specialist =

Japanese manga series

- First tankōbon volume cover

怪病医ラムネ (Kaibyōi Ramune)
- Genre: Fantasy comedy
- Manga
- Written by: Aho Toro
- Published by: Kodansha
- English publisher: NA: Kodansha USA (digital)
- Magazine: Monthly Shōnen Sirius; (September 26, 2017 – July 26, 2018); Magazine Pocket; (August 31, 2018 – February 22, 2021)
- Original run: September 26, 2017 – February 22, 2021
- Volumes: 5
- Anime television series
- Directed by: Hideaki Ōba
- Written by: Ayumu Hisao
- Music by: Tetsurō Oda
- Studio: Platinum Vision
- Licensed by: Crunchyroll; SA/SEA: Muse Communication
- Original network: Tokyo MX, BS11
- Original run: January 10, 2021 – March 28, 2021
- Episodes: 12
- icon

Dr. Ramune: Mysterious Disease Specialist (Japanese: 怪病医ラムネ, Hepburn: Kaibyōi Ramune) is a Japanese manga series written and illustrated by Aho Toro. The manga was serialized in Kodansha's Monthly Shōnen Sirius magazine from September 2017 to July 2018, before being transferred to Magazine Pocket manga app in August 2018 and finished in February 2021; its chapters were collected in five tankōbon volumes. It is licensed in North America by Kodansha USA. A 12-episode anime television series adaptation produced by Platinum Vision aired from January to March 2021.

== Characters ==
Ramune (ラムネ)
Voiced by: Yuma Uchida
Kuro (クロ)
Voiced by: Takuma Nagatsuka
Ayame (彩芽)
Voiced by: Kana Ueda
Nico (丹己)
Voiced by: Nobuhiko Okamoto
Momiji (紅葉)
Voiced by: Junichi Suwabe

== Media ==
=== Manga ===
Written and illustrated by Aho Toro, Dr. Ramune: Mysterious Disease Specialist was serialized in Kodansha's Monthly Shōnen Sirius from September 26, 2017, to July 26, 2018. The series was then transferred to Kodansha's Magazine Pocket digital platform on August 31, 2018, and finished on February 22, 2021. Kodansha collected its chapters in five tankōbon volumes, released from April 9, 2018, to March 9, 2021.

In North America, Kodansha USA announced the digital English release of the manga in October 2020. The first volume was released on November 17, 2020.

==== Volumes ====
No.	Original release date	Original ISBN	English release date	English ISBN
1	April 9, 2018	978-4-06-511047-8	November 17, 2020	978-1-64-659805-2
2	September 7, 2018	978-4-06-512660-8	December 15, 2020	978-1-64-659864-9
3	August 8, 2019	978-4-06-516860-8	January 19, 2021	978-1-64-659915-8
4	December 9, 2020	978-4-06-521576-0	April 20, 2021	978-1-63-699058-3
5	March 9, 2021	978-4-06-522611-7	September 21, 2021	978-1-63-699366-9

=== Anime ===
In September 2020, it was announced that the series would receive an anime television series adaptation. The series is produced by Platinum Vision and directed by Hideaki Ōba. Ayumu Hisao is in charge of the series' scripts and Youko Satou is in charge of the characters designs. Tetsurō Oda is composing the series' music. The series aired from January 10 to March 28, 2021, on Tokyo MX and BS11. The opening theme song is "Shake! Shake! Shake!" performed by Yuma Uchida, while the ending theme song is "Arcacia" (アルカシア, "Arukashia") performed by saji.

Crunchyroll streamed the series outside of Asia. Muse Communication licensed the series in Southeast Asia and South Asia and streamed it on its Muse Asia YouTube channel.

==== Episodes ====
No.	Title (Note: All English titles are taken from Crunchyroll.)	Directed by	Written by	Original release date
1	"Condiment Tears"; Transliteration: "Chōmiryō no Namida" (Japanese: 調味料の涙)	Hideaki Ōba	Ayumu Hisao	January 10, 2021
Mysterious disease" is a disease caused by "mysterious" existence. Koto-chan, who has mayonnaise coming out of her eyes, comes to Ramune, a doctor specializing in such diseases which cannot be explained by current medical science. She is brought there by Kuro, Ramune's disciple. Ramune offers a mysterious tool to heal Koto, who also confesses more seasoning comes out of her eyes in addition to mayonnaise.
2	"The Chikuwa Penis"; Transliteration: "Chikuwa no Inkei" (Japanese: 竹輪の陰茎)	Takashi Kobayashi	Ayumu Hisao	January 17, 2021
Kengo, a young man whose penis has become a chikuwa, visits Ramune. He believes Kengo already knows the cause behind it, but Kengo refuses to admit it. Ramune gives a mysterious tool to Kengo who begs for temporary fix instead of a proper treatment. Kengo uses Ramune's tool and goes on a date with a woman named Yumi, but then something unexpected happens.
3	"Mysterious Item Shop Akatsuki"; Transliteration: "Kaigu-ya Akatsuki" (Japanese: 怪具屋あかつき)	Norihiko Nagahama	Ayumu Hisao	January 24, 2021
Kuro is asked by Ramune to come to a place called "Mysterious Tool Shop Akatsuki". From the outside, it looks like an antique shop. But on the inside, they're selling "mysterious tools". Kuro is curious about the making of "mysterious tools" after getting acquainted with the shop owner, Nico, and his great-grandmother, Ayame, a 112-year-old who appears as a little girl. Suddenly, a strange man appears before all of them.
4	"Chili Pepper Fingertips"; Transliteration: "Tōgarashi no Yubisaki" (Japanese: 唐辛子の指先)	Hideaki Ōba	Ayumu Hisao	January 31, 2021
Takaharu, a high school student whose fingertips turn into chilis, come to Ramune for consultation. Takaharu seems to know why he is possessed by a "mysterious" thing. Ramune lends Takaharu a "mysterious" tool called "Pouch-Wrapped Nail Clipper" which can only be used once Takaharu reveals his true self
5	"Pot Sticker Ears (Part One)"; Transliteration: "Gyōza no Mimi Zenpen" (Japanese: 餃子の耳・前編)	Takashi Kobayashi	Ayumu Hisao	February 7, 2021
A boy named Rio who regularly visits the shrine. His mother has a "mysterious disease" which makes her ears turn into gyoza. The mother says she has no clue as to the possible cause, and she is confused as to why she cannot hear certain voices including Rio's. Ramune points out she may need to consider the state of her mental health as well.
6	"Pot Sticker Ears (Part Two)"; Transliteration: "Gyōza no Mimi Kōhen" (Japanese: 餃子の耳・後編)	Norihiko Nagahama	Ayumu Hisao	February 14, 2021
Rio learns that her mother's ears turned into gyoza because she refuses to accept the reality that her eldest son, Yuu, has disappeared. Feeling responsible for everything, Rio attempts to find Yuu, but accidentally falls off a cliff. Ramune manages to rescue him, only to get injured himself as a result. To save Ramune, Rio decides to use "Night's Voice Pearl" as he desperately hopes his mother will finally listen to his voice.
7	"Popcorn Head (Part One)"; Transliteration: "Atama Kara Poppukōn Zenpen" (Japanese: 頭からポップコーン・前編)	Takashi Kobayashi	Ayumu Hisao	February 21, 2021
Kuro's classmate, Aona, has a problem about popcorn popping out of his head and immediately disappearing. To cheer him up, Ramune lends him "'Mysterious Things' Storage Pouch" so that Aona is able to store the popcorn. Ramune also asks Aona to consider why the popcorn pop out of his head and why he is always sad when the popcorn disappear. Once Aona figures out the answers, he will be able to find the way to cure his "mysterious disease" by himself.
8	"Popcorn Head (Part Two)"; Transliteration: "Atama Kara Poppukōn Kōhen" (Japanese: 頭からポップコーン・後編)	Norihiko Nagahama	Ayumu Hisao	February 28, 2021
The reason why popcorn pop out of Aona's head is because his father bans him from pursuing handcrafting. Worried about Aona's condition, Kuro sees Aona's mother in the hospital to find the truth and help Aona. Meanwhile, Aona releases the "Mysterious Things' Storage Pouch" to the sky which prompt Kuro and Ramune to retrieve it.
9	"Mysterious Labyrinth"; Transliteration: "Kai Kai Meikyū" (Japanese: 怪廻迷宮)	Hideaki Ōba	Ayumu Hisao	March 7, 2021
Ramune receives a treasure hunt invitation from Reinette, a famous "mysterious" tool craftsman, and decides to go to Reinette's mansion with Kuro. Ayame and Nico are also invited to find the treasure. But, there is also another person who is invited whose presence suddenly makes Ramune's face frozen. That person is Momiji, Ramune's master.
10	"Toru's Deeply Mysterious Story - Part One"; Transliteration: "Tōru Shin Kai Monogatari Zenpen" (Japanese: トール深怪物語・前編)	Norihiko Nagahama	Ayumu Hisao	March 14, 2021
Since he was little, Kuro can see something what other people cannot see. One day, he was taken to the psychiatric clinic, but he lied to make his family stop worrying. Over the years, his strange vision had remained the same. Making things complicated, Kuro started vomiting sand. Feeling desperate, he looked for any place that could cure his strange vision.
11	"Toru's Deeply Mysterious Story - Part Two"; Transliteration: "Tōru Shin Kai Monogatari Kōhen" (Japanese: トール深怪物語・後編)	Takashi Kobayashi	Ayumu Hisao	March 21, 2021
Kuro believes that he doesn't vomit sand anymore because of the purification from High Priest. Meanwhile, High Priest locks Kuro up and forces him to commit fasting as a form of 'training'. Concerned about Kuro's condition, Ramune uses a "mysterious" tool to save Kuro.
12	"Dr. Ramune -Mysterious Disease Specialist-"; Transliteration: "Kaibyōi Ramune" (Japanese: 怪病医ラムネ)	Hideaki Ōba	Ayumu Hisao	March 28, 2021
It is the final day of Kuro's check-up. As his doctor, Ramune decides that Kuro is completely cured. Kuro asks Ramune if he should continue meeting him despite his recovery. While Ramune still wishes to have Kuro around as his disciple, Momiji's warning to him about keeping a distance from his patients has him conflicted. This time around, it is Kuro's turn to help his doctor.
