= Her Tale of Shim Chong =

2017 South Korean manhwa

- Korean cover for Volume 1

그녀의 심청 Geunyeoui Sim Cheong
- Genre: Historical, romance, girls' love
- Author: Seri
- Illustrator: Biwan
- Publisher: Wisdom House
- English publisher: Pocket Comics, Inklore (both US)
- Other publishers: Comico, Piccoma (France) Comico Thailand Delitoon (France) Pocket Comics (Germany)
- Webtoon service: Comico
- Original run: September 12, 2017 – March 19, 2019
- Volumes: 7

Her Tale of Shim Chong (Korean: 그녀의 심청) is a Korean girls' love manhwa series written by Seri and illustrated by Biwan. The manhwa was serialized online via Comico from September, 2017 to March, 2019. The story is a reimagining of the classic Korean novel The Tale of Sim Chong.

== Plot ==
Based on the classic Korean novel, The Tale of Sim Chong, the story follows two women of different social standings that have the same desire: to leave this world behind. Shim Chong is a young beggar who relies on the generosity of others to sustain herself and her blind father. The other is old Chancellor Jang's bride-to-be, sold off to him for the sake of her family. After Shim Chong rescues this new wife from the river their encounter ignites both love and secret intents.

== Media ==
=== Manhwa ===
Written by Seri and illustrated by Biwan, Her Tale of Shim Chong, was serialized online via Comico from September 12, 2017, to March 19, 2019. The series was later collected into seven print volumes by Wisdom House from August 24, 2018, to June 11, 2020. Subsequent chapters featuring additional side stories were published online from September 23, 2019, to June 15, 2020, and were then collected into a single volume, released on June 11, 2020.

The manhwa was published digitally in English by Pocket Comics, being part of the first batch of titles available when Comico launched Pocket Comics in North America in 2021. Random House announced in 2026 that it had licensed the series for an English print publication under its Inklore imprint.

No.	Original release date	Original ISBN	English release date	English ISBN
1	August 24, 2018	9791162207475	February 2, 2027	9798217093540
2	January 18, 2019	9791189709402	—	—
3	October 4, 2019	9791196720575	—	—
4	June 11, 2020	9791190630597	—	—
5	June 11, 2020	9791190630603	—	—
6	June 11, 2020	9791190630610	—	—
7	June 11, 2020	9791190630627	—	—
Side Story	June 11, 2020	9791190630634	—	—

=== Audio Drama ===
On February 24, 2020, ACO began releasing an audio drama of Her Tale of Shim Chong through their GLC++ label. The role of Shim Chong was played by Myung-hee Lee, and Madame was played by Jeon Hye-won.

A Chinese audio drama was also released in 2023. The series consisted of 14 episodes and was produced by MaoerFM and Jingyun Kaige.

== Reception ==
In 2018 the series was awarded with the Today's Our Manhwa Award by the Korean Ministry of Culture, Sports and Tourism.

Anime News Network gave Her Tale of Shim Chong a 4 out of 5 rating, praising the series for how it handled updating the classic tale without losing the main points of the original, as well as not becoming "preachy" while allowing readers to draw our own conclusions about how women are marginalized throughout the story.
