= Piacevole! =

Japanese webtoon and anime series

- The cover of the first volume of the manga

ピアシェーヴォレ! 〜piacevole〜 (Piashēvore)
- Genre: Comedy, slice of life
- Manga
- Written by: Atsuko Watanabe
- Published by: Comico
- Imprint: Earth Star Comics
- Original run: October 11, 2013 – present
- Anime television series

Piace: My Italian Cooking
- Directed by: Hiroaki Sakurai
- Written by: Hiroaki Sakurai
- Studio: Zero-G
- Licensed by: Crunchyroll
- Original network: Tokyo MX, Sun TV
- Original run: January 11, 2017 – March 29, 2017
- Episodes: 12

Piacevole! (Japanese: ピアシェーヴォレ! 〜piacevole〜, Hepburn: Piashēvore) is a Japanese webtoon series written and illustrated by Atsuko Watanabe, and published by Comico since October 2013. An anime television series adaptation by Zero-G aired from January to March 2017.

== Characters ==
Morina Nanase (七瀬萌里菜, Nanase Morina)
Voiced by: Sayaka Senbongi
Maro Kitahara (北原マロ, Kitahara Maro)
Voiced by: Yūki Yonai
Ruri Fujiki (藤木瑠梨, Fujiki Ruri)
Voiced by: Yoko Hikasa
Kirihide Konno (近野桐秀, Konno Kirihide)
Voiced by: Yōhei Azakami
Ei Oreki (折木衛, Oreki Ei)
Voiced by: Taku Yashiro
Sara Teiri (帝莉沙羅, Teiri Sara)
Voiced by: Hiromi Igarashi
Rii Kagetsu (花月李依, Kagetsu Rii)
Voiced by: Aika Kobayashi
Niza Teiri (帝莉煮座, Teiri Niza)
Voiced by: Ikkyu Juku

== Episode list ==
No.	Title	Original release date
1	"Iberico Pork Roasted Poele-style with Sage"; Transliteration: "Iberiko Buta no Sēji Fūmi Poware" (Japanese: イベリコ豚のセージ風味ポワレ)	January 11, 2017
2	"Arrabbiata"; Transliteration: "Arabiāta" (Japanese: アラビアータ)	January 18, 2017
3	"Tiramisu"; Transliteration: "Tiramisu" (Japanese: ティラミス)	January 25, 2017
4	"Caponata"; Transliteration: "Kaponāta" (Japanese: カポナータ)	February 1, 2017
5	"Sangria"; Transliteration: "Sanguria" (Japanese: サングリア)	February 8, 2017
6	"Chef"; Transliteration: "Shefu" (Japanese: シェフ)	February 15, 2017
7	"Caprese"; Transliteration: "Kapurēze" (Japanese: カプレーゼ)	February 22, 2017
8	"Zuppa Inglese"; Transliteration: "Zuppa Ingurēzē" (Japanese: ズッパ・イングレーゼ)	March 1, 2017
9	"Fritto"; Transliteration: "Furitto" (Japanese: フリット)	March 8, 2017
10	"Panna cotta" Transliteration: "Panna kotta" (Japanese: パンナコッタ)	March 15, 2017
11	"Tagliata"; Transliteration: "Tariāta" (Japanese: タリアータ)	March 22, 2017
12	"Insalata"; Transliteration: "Insarāta" (Japanese: インサラータ)	March 29, 2017
