= Bogus Skill "Fruitmaster" =

Japanese web novel series

- Bogus Skill "Fruitmaster": About that Time I Became Able to Eat Unlimited Numbers of Skill Fruits (That Kill You)
- First light novel volume cover

外れスキル《木の実マスター》 〜スキルの実(食べたら死ぬ)を無限に食べられるようになった件について〜 (Hazure Sukiru "Kinomi Masutā": Sukiru no Mi (Tabetara Shinu) o Mugen ni Taberareru Yō ni Natta Ken ni Tsuite)
- Genre: Fantasy
- Novel series
- Written by: Hanyuu
- Published by: Shōsetsuka ni Narō
- Original run: May 23, 2020 – present
- Manga
- Written by: Hanyuu
- Illustrated by: Air Matsukoto
- Published by: Kodansha
- English publisher: Kodansha
- Magazine: Suiyōbi no Sirius
- Original run: July 6, 2021 – present
- Volumes: 7
- Light novel
- Written by: Hanyuu
- Illustrated by: Yasutaka Isekawa
- Published by: Kodansha
- Imprint: Kodansha Ranobe Books
- Original run: May 2, 2022 – present
- Volumes: 2
- Anime television series
- Directed by: Ryuichi Kimura
- Written by: Gigaemon Ichikawa
- Music by: Selin
- Studio: Asahi Production
- Licensed by: Crunchyroll
- Original network: Tokyo MX, BS Fuji, MBS
- Original run: January 7, 2025 – March 25, 2025
- Episodes: 12
- icon

Bogus Skill "Fruitmaster": About that Time I Became Able to Eat Unlimited Numbers of Skill Fruits (That Kill You) (Japanese: 外れスキル《木の実マスター》 〜スキルの実(食べたら死ぬ)を無限に食べられるようになった件について〜, Hepburn: Hazure Sukiru "Kinomi Master": Sukiru no Mi (Tabetara Shinu) o Mugen ni Taberareru Yō ni Natta Ken ni Tsuite) is a Japanese web novel series written by Hanyuu. It began serialization online in May 2020 on the user-generated novel publishing website Shōsetsuka ni Narō. A manga adaptation with art by Air Matsukoto has been serialized online via Kodansha's Niconico-based Suiyōbi no Sirius manga service since July 2021 and has been collected in seven tankōbon volumes. A light novel version with illustrations by Yasutaka Isekawa began publication under Kodansha's Kodansha Ranobe Books imprint in May 2022. An anime television series adaptation produced by Asahi Production aired from January to March 2025.

== Plot ==
In a world where people gain Skills from eating Skill Fruits, Light and his friend Lena dream of becoming adventurers. When they eat Skill Fruits, Lena gets the legendary "Sword Saint" Skill, but Light gets the "Fruitmaster" Skill, which lets him grow fruits more efficiently. Since eating more than one Skill Fruit is fatal, Light is resigned to living as a farmer, until he accidentally eats another Skill Fruit and discovers the true power of his "Fruitmaster" Skill: it grants him immunity to all poisons found in fruits, making him the only person in the world who can eat multiple Skill Fruits without dying, allowing him to get as many Skills as he wants.

== Characters ==
Light (ライト, Raito)
Voiced by: Takuma Nagatsuka (Japanese); Aiden Call (English)
The main protagonist is a young man who dreams of becoming an adventurer. His Skill "Fruitmaster" makes him the only person in the world who can eat multiple "Skill Fruits" and obtain multiple Skills.
Lena (レーナ, Rēna)
Voiced by: Lynn (Japanese); Kayla Temshiv (English)
Light's childhood friend. She gets the rare Skill "Sword Saint" and quickly becomes a famous adventurer. She has romantic feelings for Light.
Ayla (アイラ, Aira)
Voiced by: Haruna Mikawa (Japanese); Reshel Mae (English)
A young girl who lives with Light at his farm. Her Skill, "Appraisal", lets her see what Skills other people have and monsters' stats.
Monica (モニカ, Monika)
Voiced by: Hana Tamegai (Japanese); Bree Han (English)
A young blacksmith. Her Skill, "Super Forge", allows her to manipulate the properties of metal.
Dratena (ドラテナ, Doratena)
Voiced by: Akira Sekine (Japanese); Maganda Marie (English)
A girl with the "Necromancy" Skill, which allows her to reanimate and control the dead.
Holy Sister (聖女, Seijo)
Voiced by: Sayaka Ohara (Japanese); Mallorie Rodak (English)
A Saint at the church where Skill Fruits are given out. Her skill that lets her see near futures. Beneath the surface she does what ever it takes to make those futures happen, including tyrannical scheming and sending assassins to get rid of those who are either a threat her and the future she sees or she selfishly deems hostile, making her the main antagonist.
Flower Hat (花帽子, Hanabōshi)
Voiced by: Ai Kakuma (Japanese); Tia Ballard (English)
Tiger Beard (虎髭, Torahige)
Voiced by: Katsuhisa Hōki (Japanese); Brian Mathis (English)
Grave Keeper (墓守, Hakamori)
Voiced by: Takehito Koyasu (Japanese); Daniel Van Thomas (English)

== Media ==
=== Web novel ===
Written by Hanyuu, Bogus Skill "Fruitmaster" began serialization as a web novel on the Shōsetsuka ni Narō website on May 23, 2020.

=== Manga ===
A manga adaptation illustrated by Air Matsukoto began serialization on Kodansha's Nico Nico Seiga-based Suiyōbi no Sirius manga website on July 6, 2021. The first tankōbon volume was released on November 9, 2021. The manga's chapters have been compiled into seven tankōbon volumes as of March 2025. The series is published in English on Kodansha's "K Manga" app.

No.	Release date	ISBN
1	November 9, 2021	978-4-06-525960-3
2	February 9, 2022	978-4-06-527089-9
3	June 9, 2022	978-4-06-528364-6
4	November 9, 2022	978-4-06-529832-9
5	July 7, 2023	978-4-06-531303-9
6	June 7, 2024	978-4-06-535075-1
7	March 7, 2025	978-4-06-538354-4

=== Light novel ===
A light novel version with illustrations by Yasutaka Isekawa began publication under Kodansha's Kodansha Ranobe Books light novel imprint on May 2, 2022. Two volumes have been released as of February 2025.

No.	Release date	ISBN
1	May 2, 2022	978-4-06-528057-7
2	February 28, 2025	978-4-06-538967-6

=== Anime ===
An anime television series adaptation was announced on June 7, 2024. It is produced by Asahi Production and directed by Ryuichi Kimura, with Gigaemon Ichikawa writing series scripts, Risa Miyadani and Yasuka Ōtaki designing the characters, and Selin composing the music. The series aired from January 7 to March 25, 2025, on Tokyo MX and other networks. The opening theme song is "Bravely Dance" (ブレイブリーダンス, Bureiburī Dansu), performed by VTubers Yukihana Lamy and Aglio, Olio e Peperoncino (a.k.a. Pepechi), and the ending theme song is "Sonna Bokura no Bōkentan!" (そんな僕らの冒険譚!; Such Is Our Adventure Saga!), performed by TrySail. Crunchyroll is streaming the series.

==== Episodes ====
No.	Title	Directed by	Written by	Storyboarded by	Original release date (Note: Episodes are released on Abema and Crunchyroll a week before their televised airings.)
1	"The Only Ingredient"; Transliteration: "Yuītsu no Sozai" (Japanese: 唯一の素材)	Ryūichi Kimura	Gigaemon Ichikawa	Ryūichi Kimura	January 7, 2025
Light lives in a world where skills are acquired by consuming Skill Fruits, however people can only consume one as eating a second is fatal. Light hopes to gain a combat skill but whilst his childhood friend Lena receives the skill Sword Saint Light only receives the skill Fruitmaster, allowing him to grow fruits more efficiently. Lena decides they will start a farm together, but as her skill is so rare the priestess Holy Sister forces her to become an adventurer. Lena rapidly rises to S Rank whilst Light unwillingly starts a farm growing Skill Fruits for the church. Ayla, an orphan who lives with Light, unknowingly uses the fruit in a stew. Light is astonished when he survives and gains a second skill, Sword God. This causes Holy Sister to receive a divine revelation of the appearance of a great evil. Ayla gains the skill Appraisal which tells her Fruitmaster makes Light immune to poisonous fruits. Thrilled, Light registers as an adventurer. Gene, another adventurer, tries to bully him and is outraged when Light expertly defends himself. Gene and his party later encounter an ogre and, spotting Light nearby, try to use him as bait. However, Light kills the ogre. Lena appears at the guild and Light rushes to see her, only for her to claim she is not Lena.
2	"Incomplete Light"; Transliteration: "Mikan no Kagayaki" (Japanese: 未完の輝き)	Tomio Yamauchi	Tomoko Shinozuka	Ryūichi Kimura	January 14, 2025
Lena visits Light in disguise so her party leader Grouse does not see them. Light manages to explain about his second skill. Lena reveals Holy Sister forced her to join the Sacred party; Grouse is a thug, and the church overlooks his behaviour. Light demands Grouse let Lena quit. Lena also demands her freedom but Grouse beats her until she obeys. Light publicly challenges Grouse to duel. Ayla appraises Grouse and learns his skill is God Speed, allowing him to move from one place to another instantly. Grouse destroys Light's sword but becomes enraged when Light decides to fight with a broom. Light realises he is losing because he is trying to match Grouse' speed, so instead he decides to rely solely on his Sword God skill. Grouse tries to cut his head off but Light simply places the broom in the right position so Grouse' face smashes into it and he is thrown unconscious into a wall. Lena joins Light's party so Holy Sister retaliates by ensuring they only receive extremely low paying jobs helping commoners. Lena accepts every job, making their party popular with most of the citizens. Light names their party Luxeria. Holy Sister retaliates further by assigning Luxeria an S Rank quest certain to result in their deaths.
3	"The Magic Castle of Spirits"; Transliteration: "Shiryō no Yōjo" (Japanese: 死霊の妖城)	Maki Kamiya	Seiichiro Mochizuki	Takehiro Nakayama	January 21, 2025
Light, Lena and Ayla are sent to investigate the castle of the deceased adventurer Count Montes where 18 adventurers have recently disappeared. Lena senses the job might be more dangerous than they can handle. Arriving, they find hundreds of adventurers dead and turned into zombies. Light hesitates to attack but Lena helps him understand it will end their suffering. Light is impressed by Lena, who has mastered her Sword Saint skill, whereas he is still learning to use Sword God. Wondering why undead seem drawn to the area they head deeper into the castle. Inside, a mysterious woman looks forward to killing "the Fruitmaster." Ayla appraises that the undead are tamed servants belonging to a powerful necromancer. Following the threads of magic they enter the ballroom and meet Dratena, whose skill lets her control corpses and spirits. She reveals her employers want Light assassinated. Lena is distracted by several of her undead friends, leaving Light to protect Ayla alone. Lena exorcises her friends, who thank her before passing on. Struggling to protect Ayla Light has her climb on his back. Elsewhere, Holy Sister has a vision of a shadow covering the moon, which she interprets as good news for her future plans.
4	"Taboo Skills"; Transliteration: "Kinki no Sukiru" (Japanese: 禁忌の能力(スキル))	Yoshihide Kuriyama & Harume Kosaka	Gigaemon Ichikawa	Naoki Matsuura	January 28, 2025
Ayla realises Dratena has control of the undead Count Montes, and through him his summoned servant the Soul Reaper, a monster that can create undead. Dratena explains about Taboo Skills, skills so unpopular their owners are rejected by society. Montes' summoning was considered Taboo; people feared his monsters and sent assassins after him, but all were made undead by the Soul Reaper, including Montes himself. Light realises Fruitmaster might be considered Taboo if it became public. Lena destroys Soul Reaper while Light exorcises Montes. Before he fully disappears Dratena forces Montes to summon Wicked Dragon, which not even S Rank adventurers can defeat. Dratena loses control of it and is rescued by a man in a mask. Ayla gives Light four more skill fruits; the useless skills Insect Resistance and Cat Charmer but also Weapon Durability Booster. With both his and Lena's swords broken Light cannot use Durability Booster and must rely on the fourth skill Sleep Pixie that emits a sleeping powder so powerful even Wicked Dragon is put to sleep. The mansion collapses, burying the dragon. The quest complete they return home where Light collapses. Holy Sister, revealed to be Dratena's master the Black Swan, starts to consider Light might be valuable in a way she had not foreseen yet.
5	"A Tumultuous Battle of Words"; Transliteration: "Haran no Zessen" (Japanese: 波乱の舌戦)	Aoi Mori	Seiichiro Mochizuki	Aoi Mori	February 4, 2025
Light is sent to bed. Lena takes Ayla shopping. With Appraisal Ayla spots a diamond being sold by a shady merchant unaware of its true value, so Lena buys it for her and turns it into a necklace. Light resents being confined to bed but Sleep Pixie monitors him. Lena reports to the guild council, made up of the Heads of the Four Bureaus. Flower Hat, head of Investigations, Tiger Beard, head of Security, Grave Keeper, head of Finance, and Holy Sister, head of Inspections. Lena notices Holy Sister dodges questions about Dratena. Since the dragon disappeared without a trace Lena offers one of its scales for a tracking spell if they provide information. Flower Hat confirms Dratena received her Necromancy skill during a ceremony overseen by Holy Sister. Holy Sister points out she has granted skills to 10,000 children since then and cannot remember Dratena specifically. She also disbands Luxeria, claiming Grouse submitted a complaint against Light. Light appears at that moment, having escaped Sleep Pixie. Holy Sister appraises him and decides to leave Luxeria alone, but she does demand they atone for assaulting Grouse by killing an S rank monster. Ayla is confused to find that her Appraisal Skill does not work on Holy Sister. Light learns that having broken two swords loaned to him by the guild he must pay a fine of 5000 gold. Light decides to have a new sword forged by a blacksmith. As this will take several days Lena leaves to continue investigating Dratena.
6	"The Legendary Blacksmith"; Transliteration: "Dentō no Kaji-shi" (Japanese: 伝統の鍛冶師)	Masato Suzuki	Tomoko Shinozuka	Masato Suzuki	February 11, 2025
Light learns of the legendary blacksmith Bolst. Light saves a girl named Monica from thugs and she reveals she is Monica Bolst. Her skill Super Forge allows her to give any metal any property she desires. As thanks she forges him fruit harvesting scissors. However, when Light requests a sword she refuses and sends him to her father Ival, who runs the shop across the street and with whom she has a strained relationship. Unfortunately, Ival is so busy without Monica's help he has a 6 month waiting list. Ival's apprentice Cain reveals Monica's grandmother was murdered using a sword Monica forged, so she swore never to forge a weapon again. Weapon merchants Zamdo and Doug arrive with more work for Ival, revealing that unless he complies they will simply torture Monica into making weapons. Ival asks Light not to reveal this to Monica. Holy Sister summons Zamdo and demands even more weapons for an unknown purpose. She also demands he kidnap Light and bring him to her. Doug kidnaps Monica and demands Light surrender himself to get her back. Instead Light easily rescues Monica by putting Doug and his men to sleep with Sleep Pixie. Holy Sister becomes convinced Light is the legendary A Priori.
7	"The Thundering Beast"; Transliteration: "Raimei no Kemono" (Japanese: 雷鳴の獣)	Tomio Yamauchi	Gigaemon Ichikawa	Tomio Yamauchi	February 18, 2025
Ival cancels all his contracts with Zamdo's Blackbird Merchant Group. Due to the late hour Light and Ayla stay at Ival's shop. Monica becomes uncertain whether her belief that swords are evil is valid, since a sword in Light's hands could be used for good. Zamdo decides to capture Light himself. The next morning Light explains to Monica about possessing multiple skills. Zamdo attacks Ival's shop and demands Light duel him, With his Thunder Charge skill that controls lightning Zamdo is able to nullify Sleep Pixie's sleeping powder and generate a lightning shield that not even Light's Sword God can cut through. Monica realises Zamdo uses iron balls to more easily direct his lightning, so she throws Light a frying pan she made magnetic, trapping the balls in the pan. Unfortunately, this only works once, and Light's borrowed sword starts to splinter. Unable to stand the guilt of watching Light defend Ival's shop by himself, Monica escapes with Ayla. Elsewhere, Lena reaches the western mountains just in time for the Athena Fairy Festival. Zamdo shows he can create objects from lightning, including a sword and a magical lightning beast, and beats Light to the ground. Monica reveals to Ayla she plans to rescue Ival from Zamdo's thugs and forge a sword for Light.
8	"The Indomitable Torch Flame"; Transliteration: "Fukutsu no Tomoshibi" (Japanese: 不屈の灯火)	Maki Kamiya	Seiichirō Mochizuki	Naoki Matsuura	February 25, 2025
Monica distracts the guards while Ayla cuts Ival's chains with Light's new scissors. Ival and Monica use their skills together to forge Light a powerful sword in only a few minutes. Monica throws Light the sword whilst Ayla throws him another skill fruit, but the fruit is caught by Zamdo who is unaware of Light's Fruitmaster skill. Believing the fruit will kill Light he forces it into Light's mouth and is dumbfounded when Light gains the skill Torch Flame, the ability to set any object he touches on fire. Ignoring Holy Sister's orders Zamdo decides to kill Light. Light sets his new sword blade on fire, enabling him to cut through Zamdo's lightning and knock him unconscious. Light's new sword is also destroyed in the attack but Monica promises to make him an even stronger one. Tiger Beard arrives with the city guard and arrests Zamdo and his men for their crimes. Light passes out, but Tiger Beard is still impressed by what he did. Ayla receives a letter from Lena explain she has reached Athena, the City of the Lake, but her investigation of Dratena will take longer than expected. Everyone celebrates the downfall of the Blackbird Merchant Group. Ival is happy Monica wants to work with him again. Holy Sister is angry at Zamdo's failure.
9	"The Reunion By the Lake"; Transliteration: "Kohan no Saikai" (Japanese: 湖畔の再会)	Harume Kosaka	Tomoko Shinozuka	Takehiro Nakayama	March 4, 2025
Lena finds Athena in the middle of a festival called Dance of the Fairies. She learns Dratena is a daughter of the Belbury family. She encounters Flower Hat investigating Dratena and asks to assist her. Flower Hat bribes an informant and learns Dratena was disowned by her father after receiving her Necromancy skill and was taken in by Holy Sister. The informant demands more money, so Flower Hat's guard Yuan threatens him and learns Dratena is in the Theatre District. Lena protests at the violence but is silenced by Flower Hat. Meanwhile, Dratena prepares to dance on the last night of the festival. Yuan explains centuries ago the Fairy King protected Athena from monsters with a Fairy Stone. During the festival, young ladies dance to show gratitude and this year Dratena will be dancing, so Flower Hat and Lena infiltrate the theatre. Overhearing other dancers talk cruelly about Dratena Lena feels sorry for the childhood Dratena must have had. Flower Hat arrests Dratena, who begs her to wait two days so she can dance at the festival. Feeling sorry for her Lena helps Dratena evade arrest. Meanwhile, a festival entertainer reveals a servant of the Fairy King is sealed in the Fairy Stone, acting as an eternal guardian of Athena as long as his dreams are soothed by the dancing. Flower Hat senses a great evil from the Fairy Stone and realises she may need to rely on Lena and Dratena if Athena is to survive.
10	"Waves of Frenzy"; Transliteration: "Kyōsō no Hamon" (Japanese: 狂騒の波紋)	Aoi Mori	Tomoko Shinozuka	Aoi Mori	March 11, 2025
Lena believes there is more to understand about Dratena. Parents do their best to keep their children away from Dratena and Lena is saddened Dratena is used to this treatment. Monsters attack the city and citizens are amazed when Dratena fights to protect them. Lena rescues a small, unfamiliar monster fighting the other monsters. They encounter Flower Hat and Yuan evacuating people to the cathedral. Flower Hat shows them a black miasma around the Fairy Stone and deduces the Stone's power has been inverted, so instead of repelling monsters it now attracts them. She plans to destroy the Stone, but Dratena protests as without the Fairy Stone Athena will not need its dancers anymore. The entertainer reveals himself as Argos the Disciple tasked with exterminating humans and reclaiming the land Athena was built on. Flower Hat reveals as Head of Investigations she is the only person with access to the kingdoms 48 forbidden grimoires; spells too dangerous for the public to know about. With their power she keeps Argos distracted while Lena makes the decision to destroy the Fairy Stone by herself. Despite the Stone's destruction Argos reveals he has already used its power to summon another Wicked Dragon; the Water God of Beginnings. Despite their fear Lena and Dratena decide to defeat the dragon by working together.
11	"Blessing of the Fairies"; Transliteration: "Yōsei no Shukufuku" (Japanese: 妖精の祝福)	Masato Suzuki	Seiichirō Mochizuki	Masato Suzuki	March 18, 2025
Dratena uses the dead monsters to slow down the dragon. Lena almost severs the dragons head but Argos fuses himself to the dragon's skull. Flower Hat deduces Argos has a possession type skill, meaning the dragon cannot be defeated until Argos is defeated first. Argos attacks Flower Hat, forcing Yuan to flee with her back to the shore. Lena refuses to give up and the unfamiliar monster interrupts, covering Lena in golden light. Within the light Lena experiences memories that are not hers; a battle long in the past, an army of female warriors and a promise to protect Athena. Lena emerges from the light with wings, having received the Blessing of the Fairies from the Fairy King. Elsewhere, Holy Sister receives a vision of two stars. Argos desperately attacks the cathedral, trying to wipe out the citizens. Lena purifies the dragon and the miasma. Suspecting Holy Sister betrayed him so Lena could kill him, Argos vows revenge and teleports away. Her Blessing vanishes and though she is not sure how Lena is certain the unfamiliar monster helped her. Lena thanks Dratena for helping save Athena. Monica is displeased with her progress on Light's sword. Ival suggests that to make a sword perfectly suited to Light she needs to learn everything there is to know about him, even if it means going with him when he leaves.
12	"The Evening Star"; Transliteration: "Yoi no Myōjō" (Japanese: 宵の明星)	Tomio Yamauchi	Gigaemon Ichikawa	Aoi Mori & Naoki Matsuura	March 25, 2025
Flower Hat discovers Argos dropped an ancient Zelem talisman. A fragment of Fairy King Obel reveals the unicorn sealed in the Fairy Stone is Syrondoros, who helped Obel defeat the demons 1000 years ago. Afterwards, Syrondoros volunteered to be sealed inside the stone so his magic could restore the corrupted land. Now Syrondoros is ready to die, and Lena and Dratena perform the Dance of the Fairies to say goodbye. Obel reveals Syrondoros' memories have been shared with his child Syron, the unfamiliar monster, and asks Lena to show him the world. With the Stone gone, Holy Sister provides Athena's guards with new weapons. Flower Hat is suspicious, since the timing of the weapons delivery means they must have been sent before Argos attack. Flower Hat reveals Holy Sister's skill is not Appraisal, it is Precognition, the ability to see the future. Flower Hat is now certain Holy Sister has been trying to change the future for some dark purpose and decides to take Lena and Dratena to Holy City to help her investigations. Lena agrees, fearing Holy Sister is a threat to Light. Dratena agrees, but only to see if Holy Sister really was just using her. With Flower Hat's help Lena contacts Light to tell him she will still be gone for a while yet. Holy Sister is glad everything in Athena happened just as she planned, and turns her attention to getting rid of Light before he ruins her plan to destroy fate. Monica reveals the new sword for Light, Homura, but intends to make an even better one by joining him on his travels to watch him fight.

== See also ==
- Gacha Girls Corps, another light novel series with the same illustrator
