= How to Keep a Mummy =

Japanese manga series

- Cover of How to Keep a Mummy volume 1 by Futabasha

ミイラの飼い方 (Miira no Kaikata)
- Genre: Comedy, iyashikei
- Manga
- Written by: Kakeru Utsugi
- Published by: Futabasha
- English publisher: Crunchyroll Manga (digital)
- Imprint: Comico Books
- Magazine: Comico Japan
- Original run: November 2, 2014 – present
- Volumes: 23
- Anime television series
- Directed by: Kaori
- Produced by: Atsushi Nasuda
- Written by: Deko Akao
- Music by: Kenichiro Suehiro; MAYUKO
- Studio: Eight Bit
- Licensed by: Crunchyroll
- Original network: TBS, BS-TBS
- Original run: January 11, 2018 – March 29, 2018
- Episodes: 12

How to Keep a Mummy (Japanese: ミイラの飼い方, Hepburn: Miira no Kaikata) is a Japanese manga series by Kakeru Utsugi. It has been serialized online via Comico Japan since 2014. Futabasha has published twenty-three tankōbon volumes since February 2016. An anime television series adaptation by Eight Bit aired from January 11 to March 29, 2018.

== Plot ==
How to Keep a Mummy follows high school student Sora Kashiwagi, whose adventurer father sends him a mysterious package from Egypt. Expecting something dangerous, Sora is surprised to find a tiny, timid mummy inside, whom he names Mii-kun. As Sora learns how to care for Mii-kun, his friends also encounter unusual creatures of their own, including an oni child, a small dragon, and a baku. The series follows their everyday lives as they care for the creatures and encounter other supernatural beings.

== Characters ==
Sora Kashiwagi (柏木 空, Kashiwagi Sora)
Voiced by: Mutsumi Tamura
At the beginning of the series, Sora was sent Mii-kun, a tiny Egyptian mummy, by his father. While initially apprehensive due to previous bad experiences with his father's "gifts", Sora quickly warmed up to Mii-kun and watches over him, in doting parental fashion. He is an excellent cook, great at household chores and sewing, and great at taking care of people. He keeps a journal where he writes down his observations about Mii-kun. His family also keeps a dog named Pochi which is revealed in episode 10 to be a special dog that is fifty years old and can live to be hundreds of years old. Later, in the same episode, Sora's father sends him a talking Anubis sculpture named Aayan.
Tazuki Kamiya (神谷 他月, Kamiya Tazuki)
Voiced by: Keisuke Komoto
Sora's close friend. Initially, he holds a great desire to "mess around" with Mii-kun. However, he quickly comes to realize that Mii is so cute, that he cannot bring himself to tease the tiny mummy. He still shows an occasional sadistic side to him and still shows an interest in knowing what is underneath Mii's bandage. He excels at studying and often helps Sora out. On his way from work, he finds an oni child which he initially throws away due to his fear of caring for him which resulted from a past trauma of being unable to save a dragon from a collector. Tazuki names the oni child Conny but doesn't truly adopt him into the family until episode 9. Above all, Tazuki is very protective of those he cares about, becoming incredibly frightening when his friends are threatened.
Asa Motegi (茂木 朝, Motegi Asa)
Voiced by: Himika Akaneya
Sora and Tazuki's classmate. A cheerful girl with a distinct fear of lizards. Asa's strength is one of her main character attributes, which is further increased when she is scared, evidenced by the destruction she causes when she finds that a dragon has found his way into her house. Sora helps her get over her fear of lizards and Asa eventually adopts the dragon, naming him Isao.
Daichi Tachiaki (立秋 大地, Tachiaki Daichi)
Voiced by: Seiichirō Yamashita
Daichi is a student at Sora's school in class 5-3. Previously, he was seen as a delinquent, prone to violent outbursts; however, this was a result of chronic night terrors and lack of sleep. Sora helps Daichi out at school, which results in friendship and Sora giving Daichi a baku doodle to draw in the dream-eating creature. When fully rested, Daichi is very kind if a bit timid and jumpy, but he also takes responsibility instantly for the violence he had done in his sleep-deprived state. The baku that helps him stays, being adopted by Daichi, and is named Mukumuku.
Kaede Kashiwagi (柏木 カエデ, Kashiwagi Kaede)
Voiced by: Ai Kayano
Sora's aunt and sister of Mokuren. She's usually working and tends to undergo a drastic personality change when wearing her glasses (specifically of the red rimmed variety) with her soft spoken, clumsy self replaced by an aggressive and assertive persona. The sarcophagus that Mii-kun arrived in was a present from her brother and used as her napping place. Some of her known careers include model, director, writer, and actress, all of which she is incredibly famous for (though few know her true looks due to her glasses at work).
Mokuren Kashiwagi (柏木 モクレン, Kashiwagi Mokuren)
Voiced by: Takashi Matsuyama
Sora's adventurer father who sends him odd things from overseas. Hence, Sora's initial distrust of Mii-kun as past gifts have included cursed dolls and scarecrows. He also sends a manual for how to care for the little mummy to his son.
Tsukiyo Kamiya (神谷月夜, Kamiya Tsukiyo)
Voiced by: Masami Nakakoji
Tazuki's little sister. An outspoken if caring girl, she's familiar with Tazuki's interactions with the oni child, Conny, but has little patience with Conny taking her sweets.

== Media ==
=== Manga ===
How to Keep a Mummy is a Japanese manga series by Kakeru Utsugi. It has been serialized online via Comico since 2014. Futabasha has published twenty-three tankōbon volumes since February 2016.

No.	Japanese release date	Japanese ISBN
1	February 12, 2016	978-4-575-84750-5
2	July 12, 2016	978-4-575-84822-9
3	November 11, 2016	978-4-575-84878-6
4	May 12, 2017	978-4-575-84968-4
5	May 12, 2017	978-4-575-84968-4
6	February 10, 2018	978-4-575-85114-4
7	August 9, 2018	978-4-575-85196-0
8	December 12, 2018	978-4-575-85251-6
9	June 12, 2019	978-4-575-85315-5
10	October 11, 2019	978-4-575-85358-2
11	March 12, 2020	978-4-575-85425-1
12	November 12, 2020	978-4-575-85509-8
13	May 12, 2021	978-4-575-85576-0
14	December 9, 2021	978-4-575-85663-7
15	June 9, 2022	978-4-575-85723-8
16	December 12, 2022	978-4-575-85789-4
17	June 12, 2023	978-4-575-85853-2
18	December 12, 2023	978-4-575-85919-5
19	June 12, 2024	978-4-575-85977-5
20	December 12, 2024	978-4-575-86034-4
21	June 12, 2025	978-4-575-86103-7
22	December 11, 2025	978-4-575-86171-6
23	August 6, 2026	978-4-575-86260-7

=== Anime ===
Kaori directed the anime at studio Eight Bit. Deko Akao handled the series composition, and Takahiro Kishida is the character designer. Atsushi Nasuda produced the anime. It aired from January 11 to March 29, 2018. The opening theme is "Fushigi na Tabi wa Tsuzuku no sa" (不思議な旅はつづくのさ) by Tsuri Bit. The 11-member idol group Iketeru Hearts performed the ending theme, "Rosetta Stone" (ロゼッタストーン). Crunchyroll co-produced and streamed the series. The series ran for 12 episodes.

No.	Title	Original release date
1	"White, Round, Tiny, Wimpy, and Ready"; Transliteration: "Shirokute marukute chīsakute totemo nakimushidakedo ganbaru" (Japanese: しろくてまるくてちいさくてとても泣きむしだけどがんばる)	January 11, 2018
Sora receives a coffin from his father. Out of the coffin comes a minuscule-sized mummy and names him Mii-kun. While practicing taking care of Mii-Kun, Sora shows him to Tazuki.
2	"Toyed With and Chased Around, Being Small Is Hard"; Transliteration: "Ijiwarusaretari oikakeraretari chīsai to iu koto ha totemo taihen" (Japanese: いじわるされたりおいかけられたり小さいということはとてもたいへん)	January 18, 2018
Sora gets Mii-kun to befriend Tazuki. Worried about his dehydration, Sora takes Mii-kun to school, but he winds up in Motegi's hands and gets chased by a rat.
3	"It's Scary When Someone You Care About Gets Sick"; Transliteration: "Taisetsu na hito ga kaze wo hītara totemo shinpai" (Japanese: たいせつなひとが風ぜをひいたらとてもしんぱい)	January 25, 2018
4	"You Can't Play Tag by Yourself, and It's Fun to Play With Others"; Transliteration: "Oi-gokko wa hitoride wa dekinaishissho wa tanoshī" (Japanese: おにごっこはひとりではできないしいっしょは楽しい)	February 1, 2018
5	"Go Away Kindness, Go Away Fear"; Transliteration: "Yasashī kimochi kowai no tonde ke" (Japanese: やさしい気もちこわいのとんでけ)	February 8, 2018
6	"I Can't Grow All at Once, So I'll Grow Over Time"; Transliteration: "Kyuu ni hamuri dakara chotto zutto ōkiku naru yo" (Japanese: きゅうにはむりだからちょっとずつ大きくなるよ)	February 15, 2018
7	"Scary Dreams Are Okay Because I'm Not Alone."; Transliteration: "Kowai yumemite mo hitoriji yanaikaradaijobu" (Japanese: こわい夢みてもひとりじゃないからだいじょぶ)	February 22, 2018
8	"New Places, Strange Places, Strange Friends"; Transliteration: "Atarashī toko fushigina toko fushigina tomodada chi" (Japanese: あたらしいとこふしぎなとこふしぎな友だち)	March 1, 2018
9	"Kind Hands, Warm Hands"; Transliteration: "Yasashī te o tatakai-te" (Japanese: やさしい手をたたかい手)	March 8, 2018
10	"A Fun Surprise from Afar"; Transliteration: "To okashiku kita tanoshī bikkuri" (Japanese: とおくからきた楽しいびっくり)	March 15, 2018
11	"I Want to Be With You Forever and Ever"; Transliteration: "Zuttozutto issho ni itai to omotterukara" (Japanese: ずっとずっといっしょにいたいと思ってるから)	March 22, 2018
12	"Always Together"; Transliteration: "Itsumo issho" (Japanese: いつも いっしょ)	March 29, 2018
