= Momokuri =

Japanese manga and anime series

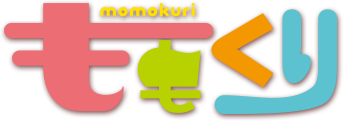
- Momokuri logo

ももくり
- Genre: Romantic comedy
- Manga
- Written by: Kurose
- Published by: Comico Japan
- Imprint: Earth Star Comics
- Original run: January 10, 2014 – September 12, 2017
- Volumes: 8
- Original net animation
- Directed by: Yoshimasa Hiraike
- Produced by: Fumio Kaneko
- Written by: Yoshimasa Hiraike; Mariko Mochizuki; Tomoko Shinozuka
- Music by: To-Mas Soundsight Fluorescent Forest
- Studio: Satelight
- Licensed by: NA: Sentai Filmworks; SEA: Muse Communication
- Released: December 24, 2015 – February 4, 2016
- Episodes: 26

Momokuri (ももくり) is a Japanese manga series written and illustrated by Kurose, and published by Comico Japan. An original net anime adaptation by Satelight was released on the Comico app from December 2015 to February 2016. A television broadcast of the anime began on July 1, 2016, on Tokyo MX.

== Plot ==
Yuki Kurihara is a teenage girl in high school who has been granted her wish of dating her longtime crush Shinya Momotsuki. At first she appears to look and act like an adorable young lady, but in reality she is a crazed maniac over "Momo". Shinya on the other hand, has had no experience in romantic relationships or anything that has to do with sex but mostly he just wants to make Yuki, himself, and all of their friends happy. As the story progresses, Shinya eventually falls for Yuki and thinks she's very cute.

== Characters ==
Yuki "Kuri" Kurihara (栗原雪, Kurihara Yuki)
Voiced by: Ai Kakuma
Yuki is a young high school girl in her second year who confessed to Shinya Momotsuki. Kurihara has a strange stalker-like habit of knowing practically all of Shinya's hobbies, interests, tastes in things such as food, and school schedule. She also likes to hide in places where no one will see her taking pictures of him. Although, even though her actions are quite suspicious and should have been definitely noticed by her own boyfriend, Momotsuki seems to have never come across the thought of her being the type who would stalk their own partner. He also never seems to notice when Kurihara is performing such actions, such as when she blatantly took a photo of him near the bus stop, until Yuki admits her habits to her boyfriend during a trip to the hot springs.
Shinya "Momo" Momotsuki (桃月心也, Momotsuki Shinya)
Voiced by: Nobuhiko Okamoto
Shinya is referred to as "cute" by many girls and even boys. He was confessed to by a girl called Yuki Kurihara and began dating her. At first he is unaware of the way Yuki had been stalking him and taking countless secret photos of him. He eventually hears from her about how she collects the things he touches, though he doesn't know that she's kept all his used straws. He's childhood friends with Rihito, Shōta and Yuzuki, and frequently hangs out with the former two, though they very much enjoy teasing him about how small and "cute" he is. Eventually, as the story progresses, he confessed to Yuki that he also likes her. He is shown to be jealous whenever he is not Yuki's priority.
Norika Mizuyama (水山のりか, Mizuyama Norika)
Voiced by: Naomi Ōzora
Yuki's best friend. She frequently worries about Yuki's obsessive stalking and other behaviors, and tries to help her in her relationship when possible. She has a sharp tongue and a poker face. She plays the piano and accompanies the school choir in competitions.
Rio Sakaki (早柿 莉央, Sakaki Rio)
Voiced by: Rena Maeda
Momotsuki's classmate. She secretly has a crush on him and often worries about Yuki's behavior and relationship with him. She is exceptionally tall and is at times compared to a "pretty boy" type, and as a result, is quite popular among the girls. She is best friends with Ikue and Yuzuki.
Yuzuki Shimada (島田柚姫, Shimada Yuzuki)
Voiced by: Sayaka Nakaya
Yuzuki is Momo's friend.
Shōta's cousin and childhood friend to Shōta, Momotsuki, and Rihito. She secretly has a crush on Rihito, and is completely unaware of Shōta's crush on her; when pressed in chapter 113 she reveals that she does care more about Shōta, and he is always number one in her thoughts, but she never thought of the possibility of romance; since they're cousins, she figured it was only natural that they'd always be together. She used to always refer to herself as "Yuu-chan" in an attempt to cling to the past, but after she confesses her love to Rihito and is rejected, she decides to "graduate" from this.
Ikue Usami (宇佐美 育絵, Usami Ikue)
Voiced by: Reina Takeshita
Momotsuki's classmate and Rio and Yuzuki's best friend.
Yuki's Mother (雪の母)
Voiced by: Sayaka Ōhara
Rihito Sawaguchi (沢口理人, Sawaguchi Rihito)
Voiced by: Yoshitaka Yamaya
Momotsuki, Yuzuki and Shōta's childhood friend. A very cool and casual type, he is Yuzuki's secret crush. His feelings toward Yuzuki are not entirely clear at first, but eventually it is revealed that he's in love with her. However, he rejects her on account of Shouta's feelings, as well as the fact that her feelings toward Shouta are so very strong and her "dependence" on him so strong that there would be "no meaning" to her loving him. Despite this, he has expressed hope that someday he'd be able to make her look more completely his way.
Shōta Shizuka (閑翔太, Shizuka Shōta)
Voiced by: Takuma Nagatsuka
Momotsuki, Rihito and Yuzuki's childhood friend, as well as Yuzuki's cousin. He and Yuzuki have been together since they were babies, and he is always there for her. In early elementary school, when Yuzuki was trying to get closer to Rihito, he saw her kiss his cheek; he realized at that moment that Yuzuki had feelings for Rihito, that Rihito had feelings for her, and that he too had feelings for her. He's been in love with Yuzuki ever since, but she has never noticed and even taken his presence for granted due to their being related.
Seiichirō Usami (宇佐美誠一郎, Usami Seiichirō)
Voiced by: Kensho Ono
Ikue's older brother, reluctantly nicknamed "Pyon-kun". He is extremely overprotective of his sister and has demonstrated some excessive interest in her and her friends. Yuki uses this to her advantage, bribing him with pictures of his sister and her friends in exchange for info on Momo's schedule.
Ema Sawaguchi (沢口慧眞, Sawaguchi Ema)
Voiced by: Yasuaki Takumi
Rihito's older brother. A medical student, he has rather poor luck with women. He tends to try to be flirtatious with the girls around him but appears to have had little luck.
Endō (遠藤さん, Endou)
Voiced by: Nana Inoue
The overenthusiastic president of the newspaper club.
Hirodai Yamaguchi (山口 広大, Yamaguchi Hirodai)
Voiced by: Kōhei Amasaki
Yuki's classmate. He is always struck down with a cold whenever mentioned in the story.
Hinano Hanao (花緒 陽菜乃, Hanao Hinano)
A new first-year student during Shinya's second year of high school. A short girl with purple hair and a beauty mark. She admires Rio and initially mistook her as a boy. Even after the misunderstanding is resolved, she asks Yuki to give her candid photos of Rio dressing up as a vampire during a choir festival in the previous year.
Sui Asanishi (朝西 彗, Asanishi Sui)
A new first-year student during Shinya's second year of high school. A tall boy with a shy temperament. He is close friends with Hinano.
Iori Momotsuki (桃月 伊織, Momotsuki Iori)
Shinya's father who is a photographer. Busy with work, he usually comes home around midnight. He has a highly androgynous appearance such that Yuki initially mistook him as Shinya's mother instead.
Umechika "Chika" Kasugai (春日井 梅千花, Kasugai Umechika)
Shinya's cousin who is in third grade. He works as a child model for a magazine of which his mother is an editor. Just like Shinya's father, he is also mistaken as a girl by Yuki. Initially hostile towards Yuki for believing that she was "stealing" his beloved cousin away from him, he eventually opened up to her after getting lost in a shopping mall.

== Media ==
=== Manga ===
==== Volume list ====
No.	Japanese release date	Japanese ISBN
1	September 11, 2015	978-4803007732
2	February 12, 2016	978-4803008623
3	July 12, 2016	978-4803009286
4	December 12, 2016	978-4803009743
5	April 12, 2017	978-4803010145
6	June 12, 2017	978-4803010404
7	August 10, 2017	978-4803010794
8	September 12, 2017	978-4803010800

=== Anime ===
The original net animation series is directed by Yoshimasa Hiraike, featuring animation by Satelight, character designs by Miwa Oshima and music by To-Mas Soundsight Fluorescent Forest (consisting of members Masumi Itō, Mito and Yohei Matsui). Hiraike had also written the scripts alongside Mariko Mochizuki and Tomoko Shinozuka. The opening theme is performed by Ai Kakuma and Nobuhiko Okamoto while the ending theme is performed by Kentarou Tsubone. The anime ran from December 25, 2015, to February 4, 2016, on the Comico app. A television broadcast of the series on Tokyo MX began on July 1, 2016. The series has been licensed for North America by Sentai Filmworks.

==== Episode list ====
No.	Title	Original release date
1	"Confession ... Momo-kun and Kurihara-san" "Kokuhaku... Momo-kun to Kurihara-san" (告白…ももくんと栗原さん)	December 24, 2015
Second-year high school student Yuki "Kuri" Kurihara who has been stalking her kouhai Shinya "Momo" Momotsuki for ages finally works up her courage to confess her love to him, requesting that they go out together. Flustered and having no prior experience in matters of love, Momo simply accepts, unknowing of Kuri's stalker ways, which including going so far as to have a collection of his used straws. After an awkward time walking home together, the two explain their new relationship to each of their separate friends. Kuri's best friend, Norika Mizuyama, congratulates her on her success on becoming Momo's girlfriend and encourages her to stop her obsessive stalking. Momo's friends are envious that he managed to get a girlfriend, and are curious of Kuri. The two begin spending more and more time together, including having lunch and walking home together. Soon however, Momo begins to wonder why Kuri always runs away whenever he tries to initiate conversations with her, and how he always manages to "coincidentally" meet her around school. As Kuri worries over whether her recent uncontrollable behaviour might make Momo think she is weird, both of them share a romantic moment together as Momo catches Kuri after school without her umbrella and shares his with her.
2	"To the Season of Change" "Koromogae no Kisetsu ni" (衣替えの季節に)	January 7, 2016
Momo and Kuri go out on their first date together, where Momo attempts to impress Kuri by drinking coffee to look grown-up but fails horribly. As Momo's birthday arrives, Kuri bakes him a cheesecake, knowing from her research that that is his favourite dessert, but drops it accidentally while trying to give it to him. This makes her guilty as she knows that Momo's parents are too busy with work to celebrate his birthday, so as his girlfriend she feels incredibly shameful. At the end of the day, she tries to give Momo the cheesecake anyway, but Momo holds her hand instead for the first time and says that her hand is his best birthday present, much to Kuri's pleasure and his embarrassment. Kuri then decides to not give him the cake, and they walk home peacefully together, unknown of a stalker behind them. Kuri hears about how Momo's grades are not very good, and that if he doesn't do well in his final exams two weeks of his summer vacation will be taken up by remedial classes. Not wanting her summer vacation with Momo to be ruined, she organises a study session at his house with him, along with Norika and Momo's two friends Shōta Shizuku and Rihito Sawaguchi. Momo and Kuri get closer as she reveals that she had baked cheesecake and offers him the special one with the heart on it. Momo also gets jealous when he sees how Kuri is getting along so well with Shōta, which is pointed out by Norika. As the two girls go out grocery shopping for dinner, the stalker makes an appearance at the supermarket.
3	"The First Date?!" "Hajimete no deito?!" (はじめてのデート？！)	February 4, 2016
The stalker, whom Norika finds familiar, advises Kuri on what kind of potatoes to buy, herself intending to get May Queens for a curry dish. She is soon revealed to be Rio Sakaki, a first-year and in the same class as Momo, and she has been secretly harbouring feelings for him for a long time. Due to her tall height and athletic talent, she was mistaken for a boy before by girls who confessed their feelings to her. Rio finds Momo incredibly cute, and feels that Kuri is not worthy to be his girlfriend. Meanwhile, Kuri resolves to take her 200th photo of Momo to fill her album, but wants to take it with the both of them inside instead, which she succeeds. After hearing Momo secretly confide that he feels that there is an awkward space between them, Rio finds herself surprisingly relieved and encounters Kuri creeping into an empty classroom, as well as overhearing her mutter about how this is the perfect spot to spy on Momo. As she approaches Kuri, the latter misbelieves that Rio doesn't find her weird for her obsessive stalker ways and runs away happily, leading the former to conclude that Kuri is a pervert.
4	"Study Meeting" "Benkyōkai" (勉強会)	February 4, 2016
5	"Rio, the Momotsuki I Want to Protect!!" "Rio, Watashi no Mamoritai Momotsuki!!" (莉央、私の守りたい桃月！！)	February 4, 2016
6	"MomoColle, 200 Pictures" "Momo kore 200-mai" (ももコレ200枚☆)	February 4, 2016
7	"The First Feeling..." "Hajimete no Kimochi..." (はじめてのキモチ…)	February 4, 2016
8	"Rio and Kurihara, Fast Approach!?" "Rio to Kurihara, Kyūsekkin!?" (莉央と栗原、急接近！？)	February 4, 2016
9	"BBQ" "BBQ" (BBQ)	February 4, 2016
10	"Cousins and, Swimsuits and" "Itoko to, Mizugi to" (従兄妹と、水着と)	February 4, 2016
11	"Summer Festival" "Natsumatsuri" (夏祭り♪)	February 4, 2016
12	"Like a Lost Child" "Maigo nite" (迷子にて)	February 4, 2016
13	"The Melancholy of Momo-kun, to the Day of a Cold" "Momo-kun no Yūutsu, Kaze no Hi ni" (ももくんの憂鬱、風邪の日に)	February 4, 2016
14	"Shinya and Yuki" "Shinya to Yuki" (心也と雪)	February 4, 2016
15	"Beach Ball Panic" "bīchi bōru panikku" (ビーチボールパニック)	February 4, 2016
16	"Spinning Kurihara-san" "Guruguru Kurihara-san" (ぐるぐる栗原さん)	February 4, 2016
17	"Family's Circumstances Revealed!" "Katei no Jijou Dasu!" (家庭の事情だす！)	February 4, 2016
18	"Date at the Amusement Park" "Yūenchi deito" (遊園地デート)	February 4, 2016
19	"Choir Festival" "Gasshousai" (合唱祭)	February 4, 2016
20	"In Exchange for Candy..." "Okashi no Kawari ni..." (お菓子の代わりに…)	February 4, 2016
21	"Flower Bear" "Hana Kuma" (HANAくま)	February 4, 2016
22	"The Tartar Rice Omelette's Secret" "taru taru omuraisu no Himitsu" (タルタルオムライスの秘密)	February 4, 2016
23	"Excitement! Christmas" "Waku! Waku! kurisumasu" (waku!waku!クリスマス)	February 4, 2016
24	"To the Day of a Cold: Part 2" "Kaze no Hi ni: pāto 2" (風邪の日に-part2-)	February 4, 2016
25	"Hot Spring Trip" "Onsen Ryokou" (温泉旅行)	February 4, 2016
26	"Their Feelings" "Futari no Kimochi" (ふたりのキモチ)	February 4, 2016
