= Comico (platform) =

Japanese online comic platform

- Website type: Webtoon platform
- Available in: Korean, Japanese, Chinese, Thai, Indonesian, Spanish, Vietnamese, English, French, German
- Owner: NHN Japan Corporation
- Website: http://www.comico.jp; http://www.comico.tw; http://comico.kr; http://www.comico.in.th; http://www.comico.co.id/; https://www.comico.vn/; http://www.comico.net/webtoon/index; https://www.pocketcomics.com/

Comico is a webtoon portal based in Japan that is part of NHN Japan Corporation. NHN Japan first launched its webtoon platform Comico in Japan in 2013. It was then followed by a launch in Taiwan in 2014 and then in Thailand and South Korea in 2016 followed by Indonesia (defunct since September 30, 2019) and Spanish language (defunct since 2019) in 2017. Comico launched its service in Vietnam in April 2020 and in July 2020 launched its English-language service under the name Pocket Comics. Comico has also stated that it will relaunch its Spanish service with the "Pocket Comics" brand later in the future. In 2017, Nielsen Media Research found it to be the second largest website for digital comics in Japan based on the number of users. The Taiwanese version of "Comico" was rebranded to the "Pocket Comics" branding soon after the launch. On January 24, 2022, NHN Japan launched a French-language service for Pocket Comics. That same year, a German-language service was launched.

== Series ==
=== Comico ===
Series title	Author(s)	Premiered
5 E	Common Crowd	2014
Ake no Tobari (明けのトバリ)	Momo Chidori	2014
Amanogawa Ke no Yon Shimai (天之河家の４姉妹-予告)	Shiroya Maken	2016
Animation e Yōkoso (アニメーションへようこそ)	Shiranui Yomi, Hon Tog	2017
Blavet	Azuma Shun	2015
Bocchan to Maid (坊っちゃんとメイド)	Hisei	2015
Bokura no Kioku Sōshitsu	irum	2015
Boy Meets Girl	Wone	2016
Call by Name	Sakana	2017
Candy Floss	Nanamoka	2014
Futsū ni Naritai (ふつうになりたい)	Canaria	2016
Gyaru Yuri (ギャルゆり)	Ahiru	2016
Hakase to Suraimu-chan (博士とスライムちゃん)	Isaki Nayuta	2015
Hamaya-kun!! (破魔屋くん!!)	Yoshino Sakura	2014
Heart Cafe (はとかふぇ)	Gokugetsu Momo	2014
Himawari Memory (ヒマワリメモリー)	Team Karutoma	2015
Horyūsō no Yatsura (保留荘の奴ら)	Coconashi	2013
How to Keep a Mummy	Utsugi Kakeru	2014
I Became the Class Representative (学級委員に、なりました。)	Noeno	2014
Jinx	Hato Nomame	2015
Josō Kareshi to Dansō Kanojo (女装カレシと男装カノジョ)	Sorata	2015
Kakao 79%	Aoi Umi	2015
Kazekanata (かぜかなた)	Ryoku	2015
Kitsune to Yōjo no 365-nichi (狐と幼女の365日)	Nanashi	2016
Kizu Darake no Akuma (傷だらけの悪魔)	Sumikawa Volvox	2014
Kochō no Yumeji (胡蝶の夢路)	Shima	2014
Koe Koi (こえ恋)	Doruru	2015
Koi Inu (こいいぬ。)	Hoshino Coco	2015
Konshū no Kanade-san (今週のかなでさん)	Chomolungma Hattori	2013
Koodori no Hitosara (小躍りのひとさら)	Kika	2015
Love & Wishu (ラブウィー！)	ine	2017
Love Connector! (らぶコネクタ！-Love Connector-)	Yuzuyu	2015
Momokuri	Kurose	2014
Nanbaka	Futamata Shō	2013
Nar Doma	Kometokaiteme Meter	2013
Nekokirai no Ie ni Umareta Nekosuki ga Neko to Kurashi Enikki (猫嫌いの家に生まれた猫好きが猫と暮らす絵日記)	Suzuo Kayu	2013
Nu no Ryōiki (ぬノ領域)	Meisui	2015
O.L.D	Kitaooji Mimi	2013
Otometeki Syndrome (乙女的シンドローム)	Harukawa Haru	2015
Ōji-sama Nante Iranai (王子さまなんていらない)	Harushion	2016
Pastel Kazoku (パステル家族)	Sei	2013
Piacevole!	Watanabe Atsuko	2014
PSI (PSI -サイ-)	Tenchou	2013
Recovery of an MMO Junkie	Kokuyou Rin	2013
ReLIFE	Yayoi Sō	2013
Rodiura Kurashi (ロヂウラくらし)	Kuchinashi	2014
Saku wa Edo ni mo Sono Soshitsu (咲くは江戸にもその素質)	Sajima Katana	2014
Sekai wa Happy End de Dekiteiru (世界はハッピーエンドでできている)	Shitanishiya	2016
Spring Snow (春の雪)	Pugum	2017
Superstar wa Nemurenai (スーパースターは眠れない)	Machidaritsu	2015
Tokeitō no Kizamu Koe (時計塔の刻む声)	nicca	2017
Tonari no Seki no Kobayashi-san (となりの席の小林さん。)	Chihara Mihashi	2015
Tōku no Hi ni wa Aoku (遠くの日には青く)	Yohan, Saizō	2014
Tsurugi no Ōkoku (剣の王国)	Yoruhashi	2014
Two Souls (～繋ぎあう心～)	Tama (II)	2015
Uchi no Neko ga Mononoke ni Narimashite (うちの猫が物の怪になりまして)	Mukuro	2015
Waon! (和おん！)	Ryoku	2013

=== Comico Japan Challenge ===
Series title	Author(s)	Premiered
Ame no Furu Machi (雨の降る町)	Shima	2014
Cherry Blossom-Colored You (桜色の君)	Kōya	2015
Eve's Apple (ゑわの苹果(イヴのりんご))	Hirahara Shidare	2014
Koshitsuji Tachi no Chinkyaku (小執事たちの珍客)	Watomura	2015
Sugar Lamp	Nanasato Betty	2015
Sugar Lamp	Gunshi ☆ KUMA	2015
The Day We Become Husband and Wife	Hishino	2015
We Were Childhood Friends (君とは幼馴染みでしたね)	Inakashi Ruya	2015

=== Comico Japan PLUS ===
Series title	Author(s)	Premiered
Itsudemo Idzurusō (いつでもイヅル荘)	Toyono Kitsune	2015
Mahō Shōjo Misa (魔法少女ミサ)	Neko Tsuki	2014
Work Love Balance	Davi Nathanael	2017

=== Comico Korea ===
Series title	Author(s)	Premiered
Amor Certus	Yang Woo-suk, Lim Gang-Hyuk	2016
Baski (바스키)	Jin Chul-Soo, Byun Ki-Hyun	2016
Blood Rain (블러드 레인)	Min, Baek Seung Hoon	2014
Brave Citizen (용감한 시민)	Kim Junghyun	2014
Clean with Passion for Now (일단 뜨겁게 청소하라)	Aengo	2015
Close up the World	S Owl	2017
Coffin Jackson (잭슨의 관)	Chong Tak	2015
Confession (떨림)	Won Soo-yeon	2015
Dasadanan (다사다난)	Herb Mandu	2017
Dial Again (다이얼 어게인)	Pyon	2017
Dokgo Rewind (독고 리와인드)	Min, Baek Seung Hoon	2016
Excuse Me, But the World Will Be Gone for a While (실례지만 잠시 지구 좀 멸망시키겠습니다)	Noah	2016
Flower Boys Hwarang (플라워보이 화랑)	KAAB	2013
Fluttering Feelings (설레는 기분)	Ssamba	2014
For Your Love (너의 사랑에 대하여)	Park Nodeok	2017
Gallery L (갤러리 L)	Jo-Hong, Lamia	2015
Gi In Rok (기인록)	Yu Gye Jin	2014
Heaven at The End of 4th Floor (4층복도끝천국)	Hyoz, Yen	2015
Her Tale of Shim Chong (그녀의 심청)	Seri, Biwan	2017
Imsulnyeon Hwayoil (임술년 화요일)	Inbee	2017
In A Heartbreak (실연중입니다)	Kukim	2017
Infinite World (무한세계)	Taeyang	2015
Juveniles (쥬브나일스)	Su Wol	2017
Life Howling (라이프 하울링)	Sung Sang-Young, Gang-Cha	2015
Loplop (롭플롭)	Chong Tak	2017
Milk Tea (밀크티)	Lucky Lin, Lady Monster	2016
Moonlit Hair (달빛머리 구름속의 달빛)	Hong Dae Eui	2010
Moonlit Hair Season 2 (달빛머리 2부 호수에 비친 달)	Hong Dae Eui	2016
My Magical Girlfriend (내 여자친구는 마법소녀)	Ha Je	2016
My Perfect Boyfriend (완벽한 그녀의 완벽한 남자친구)	Lee Ahyoung	2015
Nanohana Boys (낮은 곳으로)	Pyon	2014
Perfect Classroom (완벽한 교실)	O-Gu	2016
Retard (또라이)	Park Sung-hoon	2016
Seoha (서하)	yaggug	2016
Susu, Han (수수,한)	Seuli	2017
That House Where I Live with You (너와 사는 그집)	Sis, Hill	2015
That Summer (그 해 여름)	Kim Hyun	2015
The Clock Workers (시계수리공)	Nam Eun-Hyae, Hpark	2014
The Sensual M (모럴센스)	Winter	2015
The Strange Story of a Guy Next Door and a Novelist (옆집남자와 소설가와 기묘한 이야기)	Byul Ae Byul	2017
The Tale Left by That Magician (그마남 이야기)	Milkong Kim	2012
Tong (통)	Min, Baek Seung Hoon	2015
Tribe-X (Tribe-X 트라이브 엑스)	Hyeon Jae-Kwon, Park Yoon-Sun, Hong Ki-Woo	2014
Unlucky Mansion (언럭키맨션)	yaggug	2016

=== Comico Taiwan ===
Series title	Author(s)	Premiered
Never Heard the Sound of the Tide (未曾聽聞海潮之聲)	Moonsia	2016
Distancia: The Untouchable One (魔咒之吻)	Lumion	2016
Let's Take the Train Together, Shall We? (一起搭捷運，好嗎？)	SALLY	2015
My Prince from the Garden of Eden (王子來自伊甸園)	Mu	2015
