= Azamui Station =

Railway station in Saiki, Ōita Prefecture, Japan

Azamui Station 浅海井駅
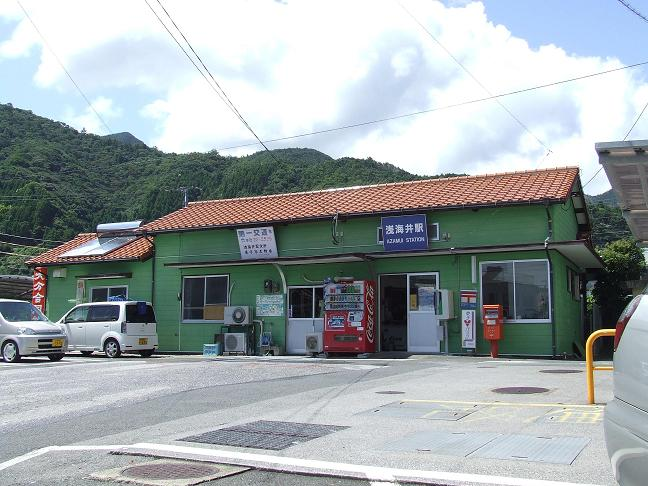
- Azamui Station in 2008

General information
- Location: Kamiura Oaza Azamuiura, Saiki-shi, Ōita-ken879-2601; Japan
- Coordinates: 33°02′37″N 131°55′09″E
- Operator: JR Kyushu
- Line: ■ Nippō Main Line
- Distance: 188.2 km from Kokura
- Platforms: 1 island platform
- Tracks: 2 + 1 siding

Construction
- Structure type: At grade

Other information
- Status: Unstaffed
- Website: Official website

History
- Opened: 25 October 1916

Passengers
- FY2015: 72 daily

Services
Preceding station	JR Kyushu	Following station
Kariu towards Kagoshima	Nippō Main Line	Hishiro towards Kokura
Location
- Location within Oita Prefecture Location within Japan

Azamui Station (浅海井駅, Azamui-eki) is a passenger railway station located in the city of Saiki, Ōita, Japan. It is operated by JR Kyushu.

== Lines ==
The station is served by the Nippō Main Line and is located 188.2 km from the starting point of the line at Kokura.

== Layout ==
The station, which is unstaffed, consists of an island platform serving two tracks, with a siding. The station building is a simple wooden structure in a basic Japanese style with a tiled roof. It serves only to house a waiting area and an automatic ticket vending machine. Access to the island platform is by means of a footbridge.

=== Platforms ===
1	■ ■ Nippō Main Line	for Saiki
2	■ ■ Nippō Main Line	for Ōita

== History ==
The private Kyushu Railway had, by 1909, through acquisition and its own expansion, established a track from Kokura to Yanagigaura. The Kyushu Railway was nationalised on 1 July 1907. Japanese Government Railways (JGR), designated the track as the Hōshū Main Line on 12 October 1909 and expanded it southwards in phases, with Saiki opening as the new southern terminus on 25 October 1916. On the same day, Azamui was opened as an intermediate station on the new track. On 15 December 1923, the Hōshū Main Line was renamed the Nippō Main Line. With the privatization of Japanese National Railways (JNR), the successor of JGR, on 1 April 1987, the station came under the control of JR Kyushu.

== Passenger statistics ==
In fiscal 2015, there were a total of 26,402 boarding passengers, giving a daily average of 72 passengers.

== Surrounding area ==
- Saiki City Hall Kamiura Promotion Bureau (formerly Kamiura Town Hall)
- Saiki City Shinonome Elementary School
- Saiki City Shinonome Junior High School

== See also ==
- List of railway stations in Japan
