= Butlers: Chitose Momotose Monogatari =

Japanese anime television series produced by Silver Link

- Key visual

Butlers～千年百年物語～
- Genre: Action, Comedy
- Manga
- Illustrated by: Yukari Tōdō
- Published by: Kadokawa
- Magazine: Comic Newtype
- Original run: January 23, 2018 – January 22, 2019
- Anime television series
- Directed by: Ken Takahashi
- Produced by: Izumi Takiuchi; Junichirou Tamura; Yukiko Katou; Wu Xiaoyu; Chen Yiyi; Hima Zhang; Vivian Hu
- Written by: Megumi Shimizu
- Music by: TOMISIRO
- Studio: Silver Link
- Original network: Tokyo MX, TV Aichi, KBS Kyoto, Sun TV, BS11, TVQ
- Original run: April 12, 2018 – June 28, 2018
- Episodes: 12

Butlers: Chitose Momotose Monogatari (Butlers～千年百年物語～; "Butlers: A Millennium Century Story") is a Japanese anime television series produced by Silver Link. The series aired from April 12 to June 28, 2018. A manga adaptation began serialization on the Comic Newtype website in January 2018.

== Characters ==
Koma Jinguji (神宮司 高馬, Jingūji Kōma)
Voiced by: Tatsuhisa Suzuki
Tenna Kisaragi (如月 天奈, Kisaragi Tenna)
Voiced by: Sachika Misawa
Tsubasa Hayakawa (羽早川 翔, Hayakawa Tsubasa)
Voiced by: Takuya Satō
Akira Tachibana (橘 晃, Tachibana Akira)
Voiced by: Tomoaki Maeno
Hotaru Aoba (青葉 蛍, Aoba Hotaru)
Voiced by: Takuma Nagatsuka
Haruto Hizakura (緋櫻 春人, Hizakura Haruto)
Voiced by: Toshiyuki Toyonaga
Kyoichi Sano (茶野 京一, Sano Kyōichi)
Voiced by: Chiaki Kobayashi
Daichi Kurosawa (黒澤 大地, Kurosawa Daichi)
Voiced by: Seiichiro Yamashita
Takashi Mikuni (御国 鷹司, Mikuni Takashi)
Voiced by: Noriaki Sugiyama
Yuki Fujishiro (藤代 悠希, Fujishiro Yūki)
Voiced by: KENN
Hikari Kageyama (影山 輝, Kageyama Hikari)
Voiced by: Keisuke Koumoto
Ren Shiratori (白鳥 蓮, Shiratori Ren)
Voiced by: Mitsuki Saiga

== Media ==
=== Anime ===
The anime series is directed by Ken Takahashi at Silver Link and written by Megumi Shimizu, with music produced by Lantis. The series was originally scheduled to premiere in January 2018, but was delayed to an April 12, 2018, premiere due to "various circumstances". The series' opening theme is "Growth Arrow" by Oldcodex, and the ending theme is "Hidamari no Niwa (Eternal Garden)" (陽だまりの庭 ～Eternal Garden～) by Sachika Misawa. The series ran for 12 episodes. Crunchyroll streamed the series.

No.	Title (Note: All English titles are taken from Crunchyroll.)	Original release date
1	"The Destined Moment"; Transliteration: "Unmei no Toki" (Japanese: 運命の時)	April 12, 2018
2	"Outside and Inside"; Transliteration: "Hyō to ura" (Japanese: 表と裏)	April 19, 2018
3	"Misunderstandings"; Transliteration: "Surechigau omoi" (Japanese: すれ違う思い)	April 26, 2018
4	"The Elegant Battle"; Transliteration: "Shitsuji taiketsu" (Japanese: 執事対決)	May 3, 2018
5	"The Case Files of the Great Detective Holmes"; Transliteration: "Mei tantei hōmuzu no jiken-bo" (Japanese: 名探偵ホームズの事件簿)	May 10, 2018
6	"Revenge from the Past"; Transliteration: "Kako no Gyakushū" (Japanese: 過去の逆襲)	May 17, 2018
7	"The Time of Awakening"; Transliteration: "Mezame no Toki" (Japanese: 目覚めの時)	May 24, 2018
8	"Shiratori Ren's Day Filled with Melancholy"; Transliteration: "Shiratori Ren no yūutsu na ichi nichi" (Japanese: 白鳥蓮の憂鬱な一日)	May 31, 2018
9	"Message"; Transliteration: "Messeiji" (Japanese: メッセージ)	June 7, 2018
10	"Attachment"; Transliteration: "Aishū" (Japanese: 愛執)	June 14, 2018
11	"Crossroads"; Transliteration: "Kiro" (Japanese: 岐路)	June 21, 2018
12	"A Thousand Years, a Hundred Years"; Transliteration: "Sen nen hyaku nen" (Japanese: 千年百年)	June 28, 2018

=== Manga ===
A manga adaptation illustrated by Yukari Tōdō began serialization on Kadokawa's Comic Newtype magazine on January 23, 2018.
