= Takuma Nagatsuka =

Japanese voice actor and singer (born 1991)

- 永塚 拓馬
- Born: 4 October 1991 (age 35)
- Occupations: Voice actor; singer
- Employer: I'm Enterprise
- Notable work: The Idolmaster SideM as Jun Fuyumi; King of Prism as Leo Saionji; Dr. Ramune: Mysterious Disease Specialist as Kuro; SK8 the Infinity as Miya Chinen; Bogus Skill "Fruitmaster" as Light

Takuma Nagatsuka (永塚 拓馬, Nagatsuka Takuma; born 4 October 1991) is a Japanese voice actor and singer from Kanagawa Prefecture, affiliated with I'm Enterprise. He is known for starring as Jun Fuyumi in The Idolmaster SideM, Leo Saionji in King of Prism, Shota Shizuka in Momokuri, Hotaru Aoba in Butlers: Chitose Momotose Monogatari, Koji Koda/Anima in My Hero Academia, Kuro in Dr. Ramune: Mysterious Disease Specialist, Miya Chinen in SK8 the Infinity, Veuve Elizabeth in Visual Prison, and Light in Bogus Skill "Fruitmaster".

== Biography ==
Takuma Nagatsuka, a native of Kanagawa Prefecture, was born on 4 October 1991. He decided to go into acting after attending his junior high school's cultural festival, and thus spent his high school years at a school with a drama club. He also attended a cram school to attend the Nihon University College of Art, but forgot to bring his admission ticket for the university's entrance exam. Subsequently, he spent a few years working as a Yokohama municipal government employee, before attending the Japan Narration Acting Institute and joining an agency.

He voiced Leo Saionji in King of Prism by Pretty Rhythm (2015), King of Prism: Pride the Hero (2017), and King of Prism: Shiny Seven Stars (2019). He starred as Shota Shizuka in Momokuri and Hotaru Aoba in Butlers: Chitose Momotose Monogatari, as well as Koji Koda/Anima in My Hero Academia. In 2021, he played the main roles of Kuro in Dr. Ramune: Mysterious Disease Specialist, Miya Chinen in SK8 the Infinity, and Veuve Elizabeth in Visual Prison, and he was a guest at AnimeJapan 2021. In 2024, he was cast as Light, a main character in Bogus Skill "Fruitmaster".

Nagatsuka voices Jun Fuyumi, one of the members of the High x Joker quintet in The Idolmaster SideM, a sub-franchise of The Idolmaster franchise. In August 2021, he was diagnosed with COVID-19 along with several other Idolmaster voice actors, resulting in the postponement of the Side Hokkaido concerts in the 6th Live Tour: Next Destination!. He performed in the 2022 album The Idolmaster Side M49 Elements: 01 High x Joker, which charted at #19 in the Oricon Albums Chart.

=== Personal life ===
He is a tea lover and has a tea time segment on his show Nagatsuka Takuma no Koko dake!, where he also created his own original tea brand, "Wonderland" (stylized in all-caps). In 2018, Wonderland became available at Shufunotomo's online shop as a collaboration with Yokohama tea store La Théière.

His special skills include playing the ocarina and doing handstands. He holds a regular driver's license.

== Filmography ==
=== Television animation ===
Year	Title	Role	Ref.
2014	Cross Ange		
2014	The Irregular at Magic High School		
2014	The Seven Deadly Sins		
2014	Your Lie in April		
2015	Food Wars!: Shokugeki no Soma		
2015	Mobile Suit Gundam: Iron-Blooded Orphans		
2015	Seraph of the End	Lacus Welt	
2015	Star-Myu		
2015	The Rolling Girls	Noboru	
2016	All Out!!	Isao Kifune	
2016	Divine Gate		
2016	Gate		
2016	Idol Memories	Takumi Mori	
2016	Prince of Stride Alternative		
2016	Shōnen Ashibe Go! Go! Goma-chan		
2016	Taboo Tattoo	Hide	
2016	The Disastrous Life of Saiki K.		
2017	Katsugeki/Touken Ranbu	Konnosuke	
2017	My Hero Academia	Kōji Kōda	
2017	Nana Maru San Batsu	Akira Sonohara	
2017	Neko to Mata	Neko	
2017	The Idolmaster SideM	Jun Fuyumi	
2018	Butlers: Chitose Momotose Monogatari	Hotaru Aoba	
2018	Double Decker! Doug & Kirill	Apple	
2018	FLCL Alternative	Kado Sasaki	
2020	Motto! Majime ni Fumajime Kaiketsu Zorori	Cobble	
2020	Number24	Ryūsei Hiyoshi	
2020	Ore no Yubi de Midarero	Kaname Chiba	
2020	Yu-Gi-Oh! Sevens	Yoshio Adachi	
2021	Back Arrow	Goat	
2021	Dr. Ramune: Mysterious Disease Specialist	Kuro	
2021	SK8 the Infinity	Miya Chinen	
2021	Visual Prison	Veuve Elizabeth	
2022	Deaimon	Saki Seto	
2022	Yu-Gi-Oh! Go Rush!!	Bochi	
2023	Saving 80,000 Gold in Another World for My Retirement	Theodore	
2023	Summoned to Another World... Again?	Tōma	
2023	The Most Heretical Last Boss Queen	Eric	
2024	A Herbivorous Dragon of 5,000 Years Gets Unfairly Villainized	Shikoku no Chi leader	
2024	I Was Reincarnated as the 7th Prince so I Can Take My Time Perfecting My Magical Ability	Crow	
2025	Bogus Skill "Fruitmaster"	Light	
2025	From Bureaucrat to Villainess: Dad's Been Reincarnated!	Pierre Gemeaux	
2025	The Gorilla God's Go-To Girl	Eddie Pheles	
2025	Fermat Kitchen	Milo Vivia	
2026	The Daily Life of a Part-time Torturer	Mikke	
2026	Recommendations from Iwamoto-senpai	Shizuma Aonuma	
2027	Isshiki-san Wants to Know About Love	Masato Nakatani	

=== Animated film ===
Year	Title	Role	Ref.
2015	King of Prism by Pretty Rhythm	Leo Saionji	
2017	King of Prism: Pride the Hero	Leo Saionji	
2019	King of Prism: Shiny Seven Stars	Leo Saionji	

=== Original net animation ===
Year	Title	Role	Ref.
2016	Momokuri	Shota Shizuka	
2023	Hundred Notes	Yuito Kuruse	

=== Video games ===
Year	Title	Role	Ref.
2017	Atelier Lydie & Suelle: The Alchemists and the Mysterious Paintings	Alto	
2020	Disney Twisted-Wonderland	Neige LeBlanche	
2021	Jack Jeanne	Yuki Uki	
2022	Ensemble Stars!	Kurone Hitsugi	
2022	Witch on the Holy Night	Dam	
2024	Matsurika no Kei -kEi- Tenmeiin Iden	Bicorn	
