= Hishiro Station =

Railway station in Tsukumi, Ōita Prefecture, Japan

Hishiro Station 日代駅
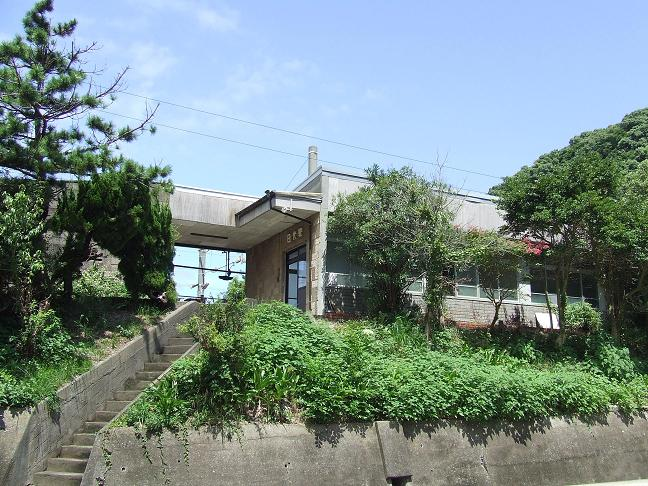
- Hishiro Station in 2008

General information
- Location: Ajiro, Tsukumi-shi, Ōita-ken 879-2682; Japan
- Coordinates: 33°03′58″N 131°55′07″E
- Operator: JR Kyushu
- Line: ■ Nippō Main Line
- Distance: 184.4 km from Kokura
- Platforms: 2 side platform
- Tracks: 2

Construction
- Structure type: At grade
- Accessible: No - steep steps to station

Other information
- Status: Unstaffed
- Website: Official website

History
- Opened: 25 October 1916

Passengers
- FY2015: 45 daily

Services
Preceding station	JR Kyushu	Following station
Azamui towards Kagoshima	Nippō Main Line	Tsukumi towards Kokura
Location
- Location within Oita Prefecture Location within Japan

Hishiro Station (日代駅, Hishiro-eki) is a passenger railway station located in the city of Tsukumi, Ōita, Japan. It is operated by JR Kyushu.

== Lines ==
The station is served by the Nippō Main Line and is located 184.4 km from the starting point of the line at Kokura.

== Layout ==
The station, which is unstaffed, consists of two side platforms serving two tracks on an embankment. From the access road, a steep flight of stairs leads up to the station building, a small, modern stonework structure which houses a waiting area and an automatic ticket vending machine. Access to the opposite side platform is by means of a footbridge.

=== Platforms ===
1	■ ■ Nippō Main Line	for Ōita and Kokura
2	■ ■ Nippō Main Line	for Saiki and Nobeoka

== History ==
The private Kyushu Railway had, by 1909, through acquisition and its own expansion, established a track from Kokura to Yanagigaura. The Kyushu Railway was nationalised on 1 July 1907. Japanese Government Railways (JGR), designated the track as the Hōshū Main Line on 12 October 1909 and expanded it southwards in phases, with Saiki opening as the new southern terminus on 25 October 1916. On the same day, Hishiro was opened as an intermediate station on the new track. On 15 December 1923, the Hōshū Main Line was renamed the Nippō Main Line. With the privatization of Japanese National Railways (JNR), the successor of JGR, on 1 April 1987, the station came under the control of JR Kyushu.

== Passenger statistics ==
In fiscal 2015, there were a total of 16,389 boarding passengers, giving a daily average of 45 passengers.

== Surrounding area ==
- Tsukumi City Hall Hishiro Branch
- Tsukumi City Hishiro Elementary School (closed)
- Tsukumi City Hishiro Junior High School (closed)
- Japan National Route 217

== See also ==
- List of railway stations in Japan
