= Kaizaki Station =

Railway station in Saiki, Ōita Prefecture, Japan

Kaizaki Station 海崎駅
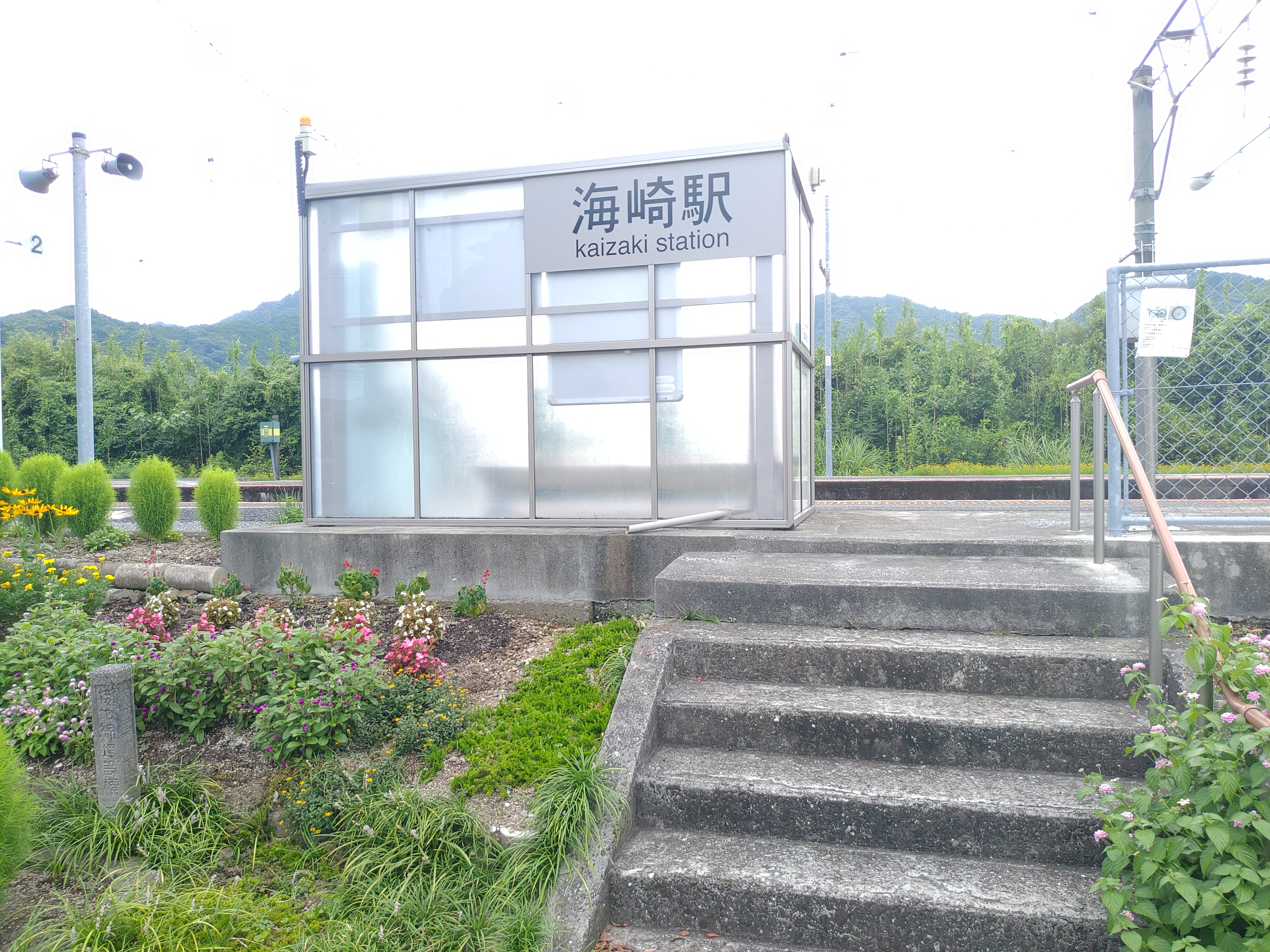
- Kaizaki Station in 2022

General information
- Location: Kaizaki, Saiki-shi, Ōita-ken 876-1105; Japan
- Coordinates: 32°59′46″N 131°53′17″E
- Operator: JR Kyushu
- Line: ■ Nippō Main Line
- Distance: 194.8 km from Kokura
- Platforms: 2 side platforms
- Tracks: 2 + 1 siding

Construction
- Structure type: At grade
- Parking: Available at forecourt
- Accessible: No - platforms linked by footbridge

Other information
- Status: Unstaffed
- Website: Official website

History
- Opened: 1 July 1923

Passengers
- FY2015: 42 daily

Services
Preceding station	JR Kyushu	Following station
Kariu towards Kagoshima	Nippō Main Line	Saiki towards Kokura
Location
- Location within Oita Prefecture Location within Japan

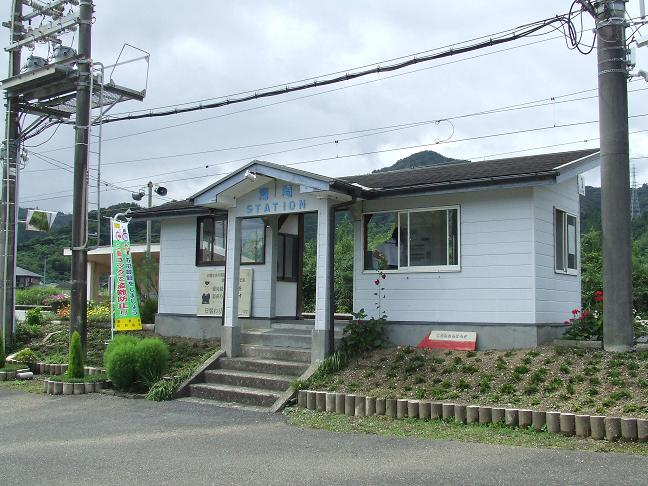
Kaizaki Station in 2008

Kaizaki Station (海崎駅, Kaizaki-eki) is a passenger railway station located in the city of Saiki, Ōita, Japan. It is operated by JR Kyushu.

== Lines ==
The station is served by the Nippō Main Line and is located 194.8 km from the starting point of the line at Kokura.

== Layout ==
The station, which is unstaffed, consists of two side platforms serving two tracks, with a siding. The station building, a narrow simple wooden structure in a basic Japanese style with a tiled roof, as destroyed by a fire in 2018. The station is unstaffed. Access to the opposite platform is by means of a footbridge.

=== Platforms ===
1	■ ■ Nippō Main Line	for Saiki
2	■ ■ Nippō Main Line	for Ōita

== History ==
Japanese Government Railways opened the station on 1 July 1923 as an additional station on the existing track of its then Hōshū Main Line, which was later renamed the Nippō Main Line on 15 December 1923. With the privatization of Japanese National Railways (JNR), the successor of JGR, on 1 April 1987, the station came under the control of JR Kyushu.

== Passenger statistics ==
During the 2015 fiscal year, there was a total of 15,497 boarding passengers, giving a daily average of 42 passengers.

== Surrounding area ==
- Kaizaki Post Office
- Taiheiyo Cement Oita Factory Saiki Plant

== See also ==
- List of railway stations in Japan
