= Kariu Station =

Railway station in Saiki, Ōita Prefecture, Japan

Kariu Station 狩生駅
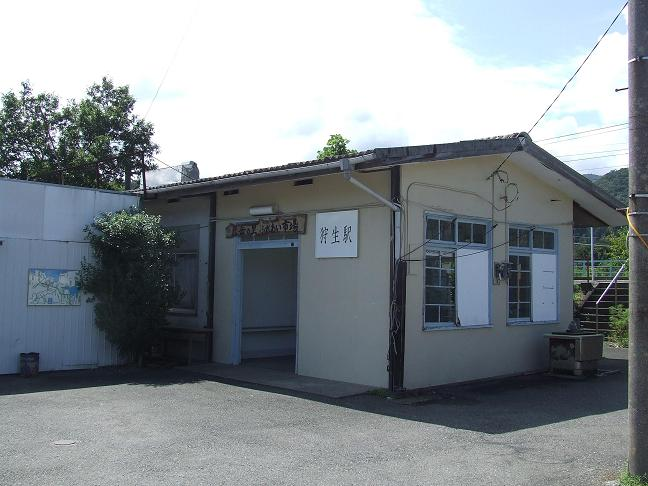
- Kariu Station in 2008

General information
- Location: Kariu, Saiki-shi, Ōita-ken 876-1101; Japan
- Coordinates: 33°00′55″N 131°54′17″E
- Operator: JR Kyushu
- Line: ■ Nippō Main Line
- Distance: 192.0 km from Kokura
- Platforms: 2 side platforms
- Tracks: 2

Construction
- Structure type: At grade
- Accessible: No - platforms linked by footbridge

Other information
- Status: Unstaffed
- Website: Official website

History
- Opened: 15 April 1959

Passengers
- FY2015: 16 daily

Services
Preceding station	JR Kyushu	Following station
Azamui towards Kagoshima	Nippō Main Line	Kaizaki towards Kokura
Location
- Location within Oita Prefecture Location within Japan

Kariu Station (狩生駅, Kariu-eki) is a passenger railway station located in the city of Saiki, Ōita, Japan. It is operated by JR Kyushu.

== Lines ==
The station is served by the Nippō Main Line and is located 192.0 km from the starting point of the line at Kokura.

== Layout ==
The station, which is unstaffed, consists of two side platforms serving two tracks. The station building is a simple wooden sshed which serves only to house a waiting area and an automatic ticket vending machine. Another wooden shed, at right angles, is used occasionally as a community meeting space and as a marketplace for local produce. Access to the opposite side platform is by means of a footbridge.

=== Platforms ===
1	■ ■ Nippō Main Line	for Saiki
2	■ ■ Nippō Main Line	for Ōita

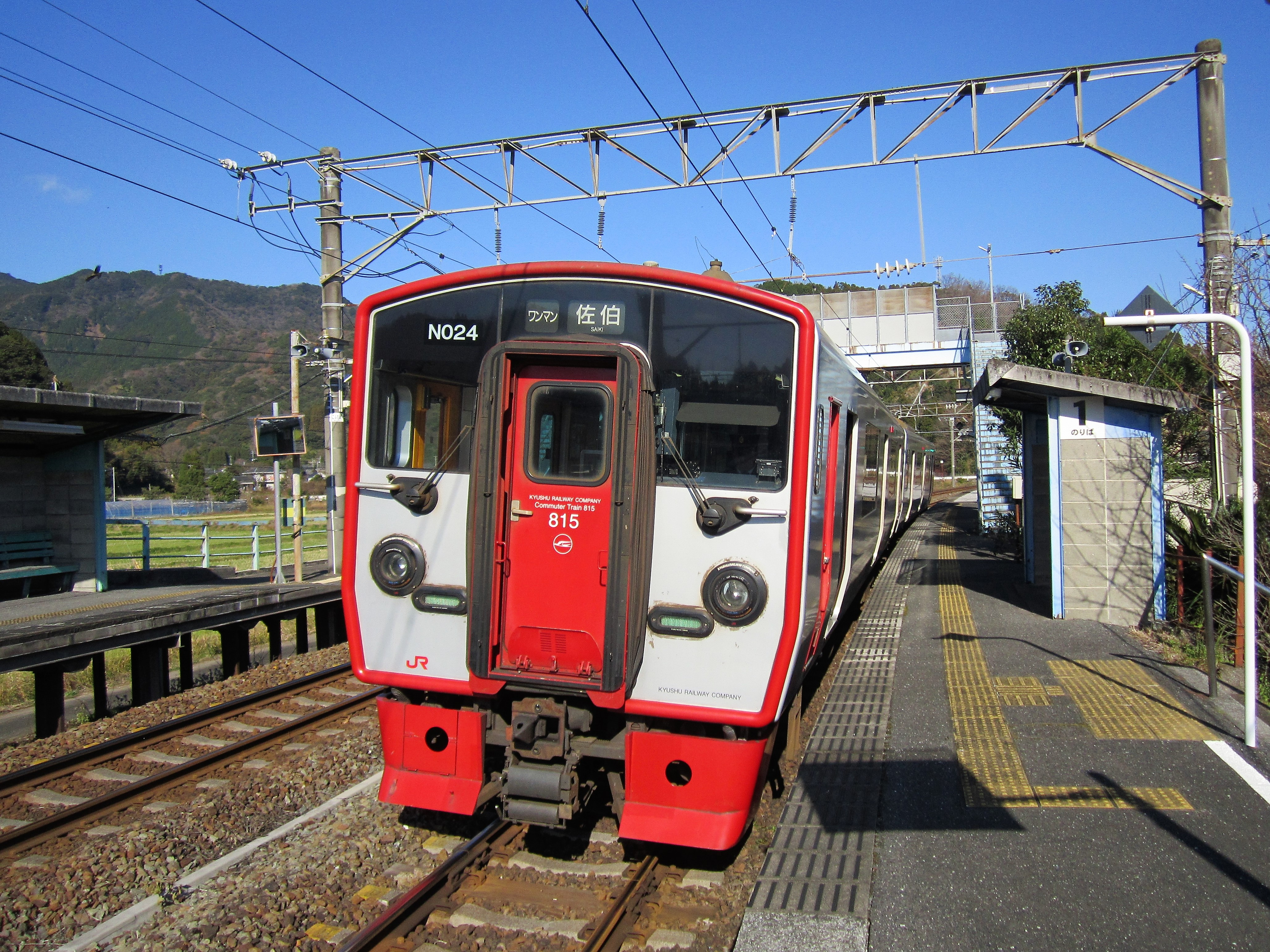
Kuha 814-24 at Kariu Station

== History ==
Japanese National Railways (JNR) opened the station on 15 April 1959 as an additional station on the existing track of the Nippō Main Line. With the privatization of JNR on 1 April 1987, the station came under the control of JR Kyushu.

== Passenger statistics ==
In fiscal 2015, there were a total of 5,728 boarding passengers, giving a daily average of 16 passengers.

== Surrounding area ==
- Japan National Route 217
- Karyu Limestone Cave

== See also ==
- List of railway stations in Japan
