= Usuki Station =

Usuki Station is the name of two train stations in Japan:

- Usuki Station (Kagoshima) (宇宿駅)
- Usuki Station (Ōita) (臼杵駅)
