= Shitanoe Station =

Railway station in Usuki, Ōita Prefecture, Japan

Shitanoe Station 下ノ江駅
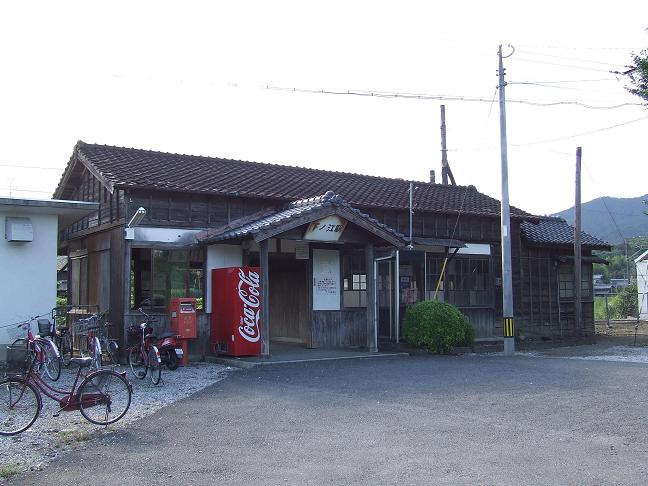
- Shitanoe Station in 2008

General information
- Location: Tai, Usuki-shi, Ōita-ken 875-0003; Japan
- Coordinates: 33°09′31″N 131°48′41″E
- Operator: JR Kyushu
- Line: ■ Nippō Main Line
- Distance: 161.1 km from Kokura
- Platforms: 1 island platform
- Tracks: 2 + 1 siding

Construction
- Accessible: No - island platform accessed by footbridge

Other information
- Status: Unstaffed
- Website: Official website

History
- Opened: 15 August 1915

Passengers
- FY2015: 53 daily

Services
Preceding station	JR Kyushu	Following station
Kumasaki towards Kagoshima	Nippō Main Line	Sashiu towards Kokura
Location
- Location within Oita Prefecture Location within Japan

Shitanoe Station (下ノ江駅, Shitanoe-eki) is a passenger railway station located in the city of Usuki, Ōita, Japan. It is operated by JR Kyushu.

== Lines ==
The station is served by the Nippō Main Line and is located 161.1 km from the starting point of the line at Kokura.

== Layout ==
The station, which is not staffed, consists of an island platform serving at grade. The station building is an old Japanese-style structure with a ticket window which is now not staffed and serves only as a waiting room. A footbridge gives access to the island platform where there is another enclosed waiting room which houses an automatic ticket vending machine. A siding branches off the main tracks and terminates in a vehicle shed. Along this siding can be seen the remains of a disused freight platform.

=== Platforms ===
1	■ ■ Nippō Main Line	for Saiki
2	■ ■ Nippō Main Line	for Ōita

== History ==
The private Kyushu Railway had, by 1909, through acquisition and its own expansion, established a track from Kokura to Yanagigaura. The Kyushu Railway was nationalised on 1 July 1907. Japanese Government Railways (JGR), designated the track as the Hōshū Main Line on 12 October 1909 and expanded it southwards in phases, with Usuki opening as the new southern terminus on 15 August 1915. On the same day, Shitanoe was opened as one of several intermediate statIns along the new track. On 15 December 1923, the Hōshū Main Line was renamed the Nippō Main Line. With the privatization of Japanese National Railways (JNR), the successor of JGR, on 1 April 1987, the station came under the control of JR Kyushu.

== Passenger statistics ==
In fiscal 2015, there were a total of 19,343 boarding passengers, giving a daily average of 53 passengers.

== Surrounding area ==
- Shimonoe Shipbuilding
- Japan National Route 217

== See also ==
- List of railway stations in Japan
