= Nagoriyuki =

1974 song by Kaguyahime

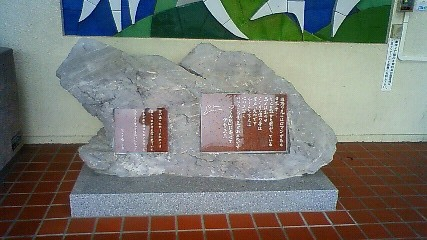
Monument at Tsukumi Station

Nagoriyuki (なごり雪, lit. 'remaining snow') is a song by Japanese folk group Kaguyahime from their album Sankaidate no Uta (1974).

A cover by Iruka released as a single in 1975 became her most successful track, and Nagoriyuki has since been covered by a lengthy list of other artists (see ja:なごり雪#その他のカバー). It is used as a jingle for Tsukumi Station; Shōzō Ise, the composer, hails from Tsukumi. A 2002 movie directed by Nobuhiko Obayashi uses the song as a central theme, and Iruka recorded a Korean rendition for the 2003 movie Chirusoku no Natsu.
