= Kōrimoto Station =

Kōrimoto Station is the name of two train stations in Kagoshima City, Kagoshima Prefecture, Japan:

- Kōrimoto Station (JR Kyushu)
- Kōrimoto Station (Kagoshima City Tram)
