= Usuki =

Usuki 臼杵市
- City
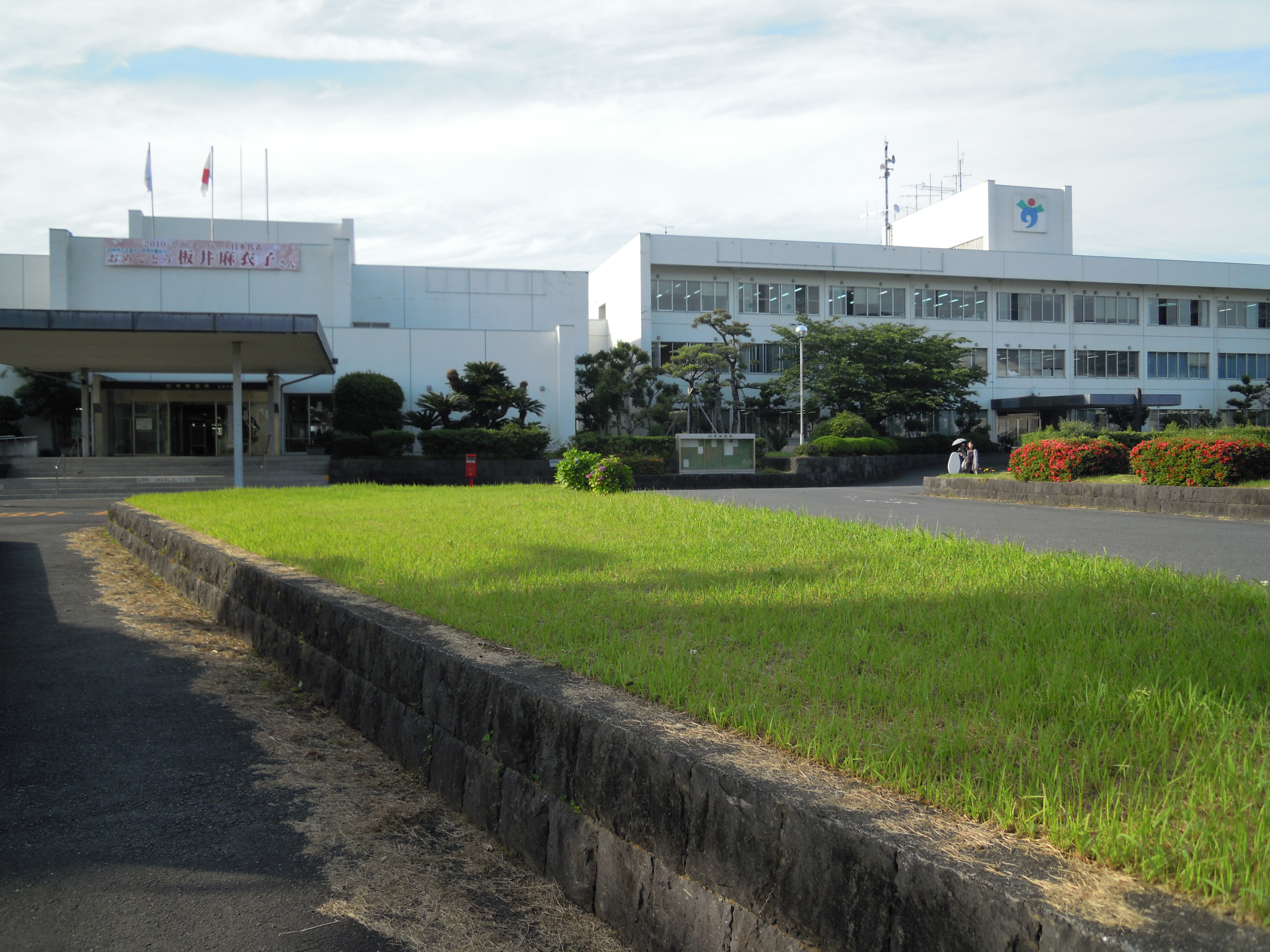
- Usuki City Hall

- Flag Seal
- /0/queryThe property query is required; /0/idsThe property ids is required; /0Failed to match at least one schema; /0/titleThe property title is required; /0/serviceDoes not have a value in the enumeration ["page"]; /0Failed to match exactly one schema; /0/geometriesThe property geometries is required; /0/typeDoes not have a value in the enumeration ["GeometryCollection"]; /0/typeDoes not have a value in the enumeration ["MultiPolygon"]; /0/typeDoes not have a value in the enumeration ["Point"]; /0/typeDoes not have a value in the enumeration ["MultiPoint"]; /0/typeDoes not have a value in the enumeration ["LineString"]; /0/typeDoes not have a value in the enumeration ["MultiLineString"]; /0/typeDoes not have a value in the enumeration ["Polygon"]; /0/coordinatesThe property coordinates is required; /0/geometryThe property geometry is required; /0/typeDoes not have a value in the enumeration ["Feature"]; /0/featuresThe property features is required; /0/typeDoes not have a value in the enumeration ["FeatureCollection"]; Location of Usuki in Ōita Prefecture

- Location in Japan
- Coordinates: 33°07′34″N 131°48′19″E
- Country: Japan
- Region: Kyushu
- Prefecture: Ōita

Government
  - Mayor: Goro Nakano (since January 2009)

Area
  - Total: 291.20 km^{2} (112.43 sq mi)

Population (October 1, 2023)
  - Total: 34,155
  - Density: 117.29/km^{2} (303.78/sq mi)
- Time zone: UTC+09:00 (JST)
- City hall address: 72-1 Usuki, Usuki-shi, Ōita-ken 875-8501
- Website: Official website
- Symbols
- Flower: Salvia splendens
- Tree: Kabosu

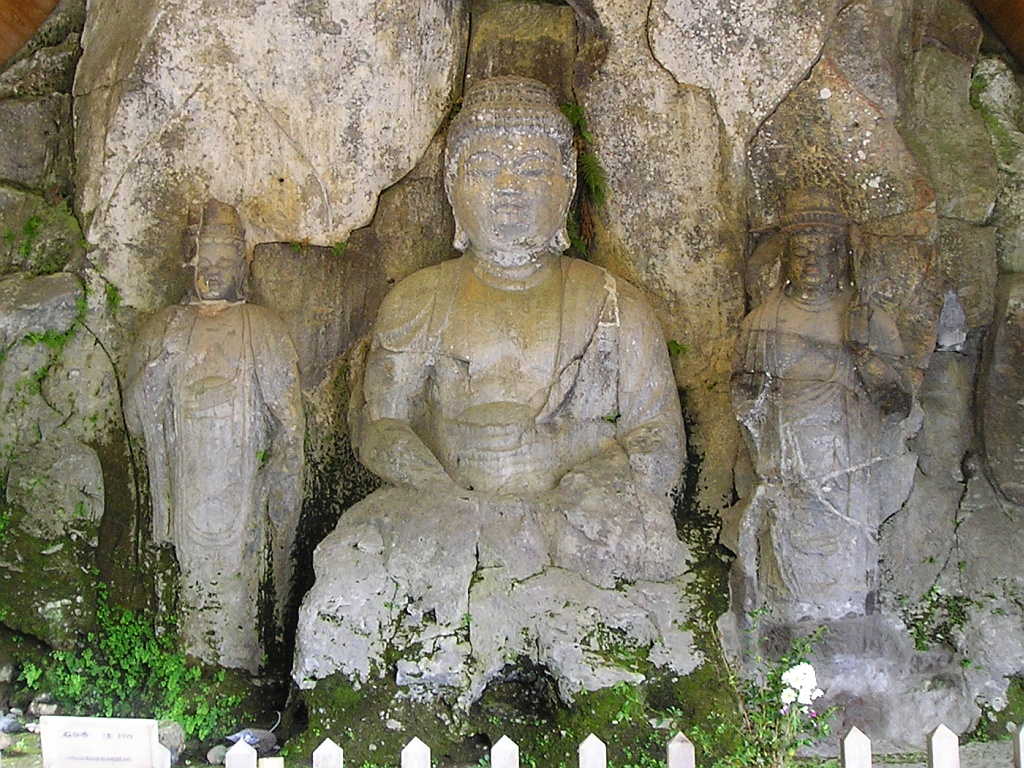
Usuki Stone Buddhas

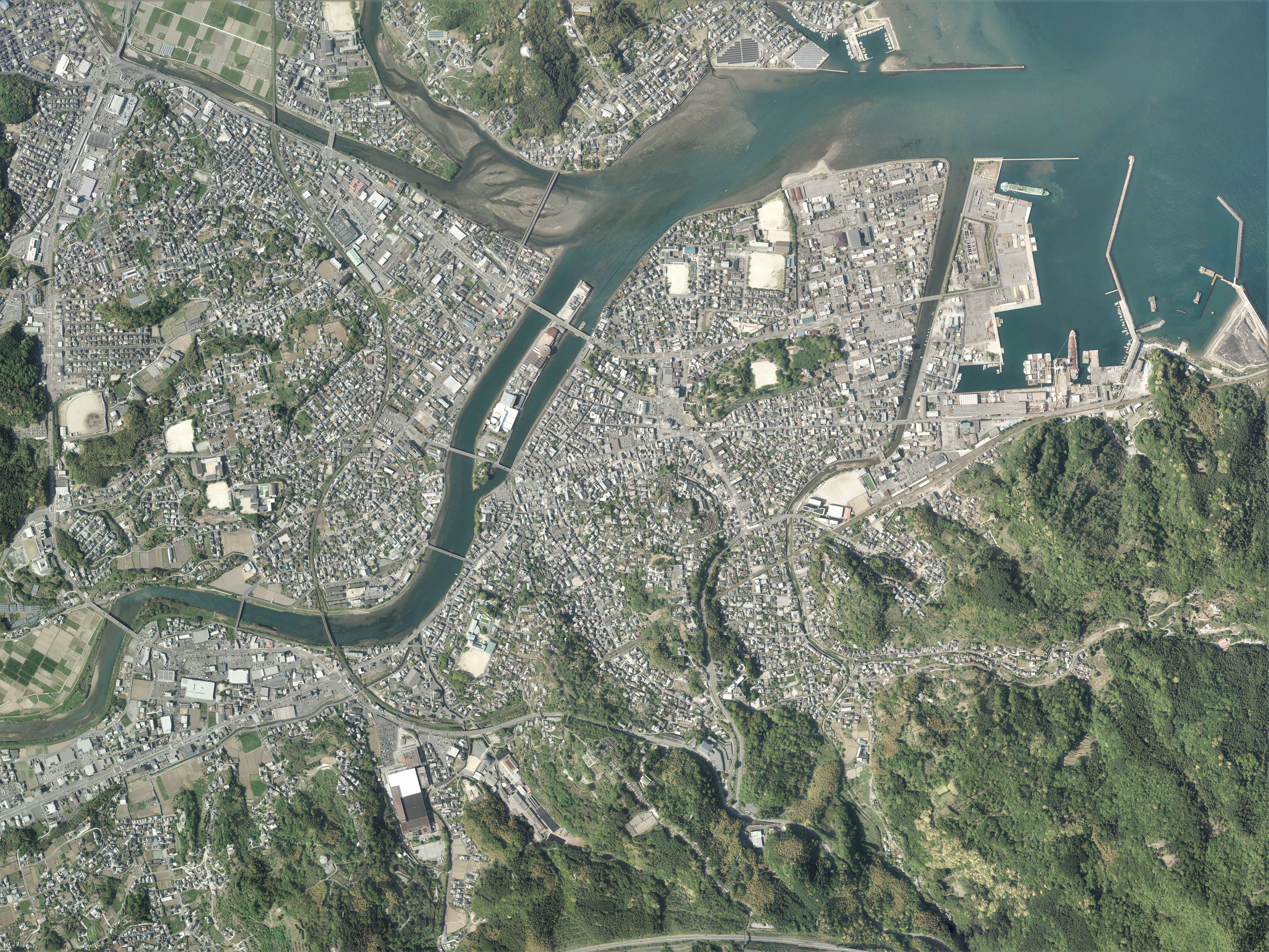
Usuki city center area Aerial photograph

Usuki (臼杵市, Usuki-shi; Japanese pronunciation: [ɯ̈̀.sɨ̥.k̟ʲí(.ɕì)]) is a city located on the east coast of Ōita Prefecture, Japan. As of 1 October 2023, the city had an estimated population of 34,155 in 14538 households, and a population density of 120 persons per km^{2}. The total area of the city is 868.02 km^{2} (335.14 sq mi). It is famous for its Usuki Stone Buddhas, a National Treasure, and its soy sauce production.

== Geography ==
Usuki is located in east-central Ōita Prefecture, bordered by the prefectural capital at Ōita City to the north. The eastern part faces the Bungo Channel and stretches along Usuki Bay, surrounded by the Saganoseki Peninsula to the north and the Nagame Peninsula to the south. Within the bay are Kuroshima Island and Tsukumi Island. The main urban area is on the plains around the mouth of the Usuki River, which flows into Usuki Bay. The inland area consists of gentle hills in the north and rising to an elevation of 500 to 600 meters in the south.

=== Neighboring municipalities ===
Ōita Prefecture

- Bungo-Ōno
- Ōita
- Saiki
- Tsukumi

=== Climate ===
Usuki has a humid subtropical climate (Köppen Cfa) characterized by warm summers and cool winters with light to no snowfall. The average annual temperature in Usuki is 15.6 °C. The average annual rainfall is 1759 mm with September as the wettest month. The temperatures are highest on average in August, at around 26.1 °C, and lowest in January, at around 6.5 °C.

=== Demographics ===
Per Japanese census data, the population of Usuki is as shown below

Historical population
Year	Pop.	±%
1960	61,337	—
1970	52,434	−14.5%
1980	51,302	−2.2%
1990	48,754	−5.0%
2000	45,486	−6.7%
2010	41,469	−8.8%
2020	36,158	−12.8%

== History ==
The area of Usuki was part of ancient Bungo Province. During the Edo period it was mostly under control of Usuki Domain and was ruled by the Inaba clan, with smaller areas under control of Saiki Domain and Kumamoto Domain until the Meiji restoration. William Adams, Jan Joosten, Jacob Quaeckernaeck and Melchior van Santvoort got stranded on the coast of Bungo, now Usuki City, in April 1600, on the ship "De Liefde", marking the first contact that led to many years of Dutch-Japanese trading partnership. The town of Usuki within Kitaamabe District, Ōita was established on May 1, 1889 with the creation of the modern municipalities system. On July 1, 1907 Usuki annexed the neighboring villages of Hamamura, Shimonantsuru, and Kamiura. On April 1, 1950 Usuki merged with neighboring Umibe village and was raised to city status. On March 31, 1954 Usuki expanded by annexing the villages of Sashibu, Shimonoe, Kamikita Tsuru, Shimokita Tsuru, and Minami Tsuru.

On January 1, 2005 the town of Notsu (from Ōno District) was merged into Usuki.

== Government ==
Usuki has a mayor-council form of government with a directly elected mayor and a unicameral city council of 18 members. Usuki contributes two members to the Ōita Prefectural Assembly. In terms of national politics, the city is part of the Ōita 2nd district of the lower house of the Diet of Japan.

== Economy ==
Primary industries such as agriculture and fishing, shipbuilding, and brewing industries such as soy sauce and miso. The city is well known for its kabosu fruits. Economically, it belongs to the Ōita metropolitan area and has close ties with Ōita City. In particular, the shipbuilding industry accounts for 73% of the total output of the city's manufacturing industry. Tourism is also an important contributor to the local economy and Usuki is actively promoting its look and feel of a Japanese jōkamachi.

== Education ==
Usuki has 13 public elementary schools and five public junior high schools operated by the city government. The city has two public high schools operated by the Ōita Prefectural Board of Education. The prefecture operates one special education school for the handicapped.

== Transportation ==
=== Railways ===
JR Kyushu - Nippō Main Line

- Sashiu - Shitanoe - Kumasaki - Kami-Usuki - Usuki

=== Highways ===
- Higashikyushu Expressway
- National Route 10
- National Route 217
- National Route 502

=== Ferries ===
Ferries travel between Usuki and Yawatahama City in Ehime Prefecture, Shikoku through the two ferry companies Kyūshi Orange Ferry and Uwajima Unyu Ferry.

== Sister cities ==
- Kandy, Sri Lanka, sister city since February 27, 1967
- Dunhuang, China, friendship city since September 27, 1994

== Local attractions ==
- Fugen Temple, burial site of Kicchomu
- Furen Limestone Caves, a national monument
- Hakubakei
- Inaba-Family Villa, a former samurai residence
- Meiji Bridge
- Naora Nobuo Memorial Museum
- Nioza Historical Road
- Nogami Yaeko Memorial Museum
- Usuki Castle
- Usuki City Historical Museum
- Usuki Stone Buddhas, a national treasure and special historical landmark
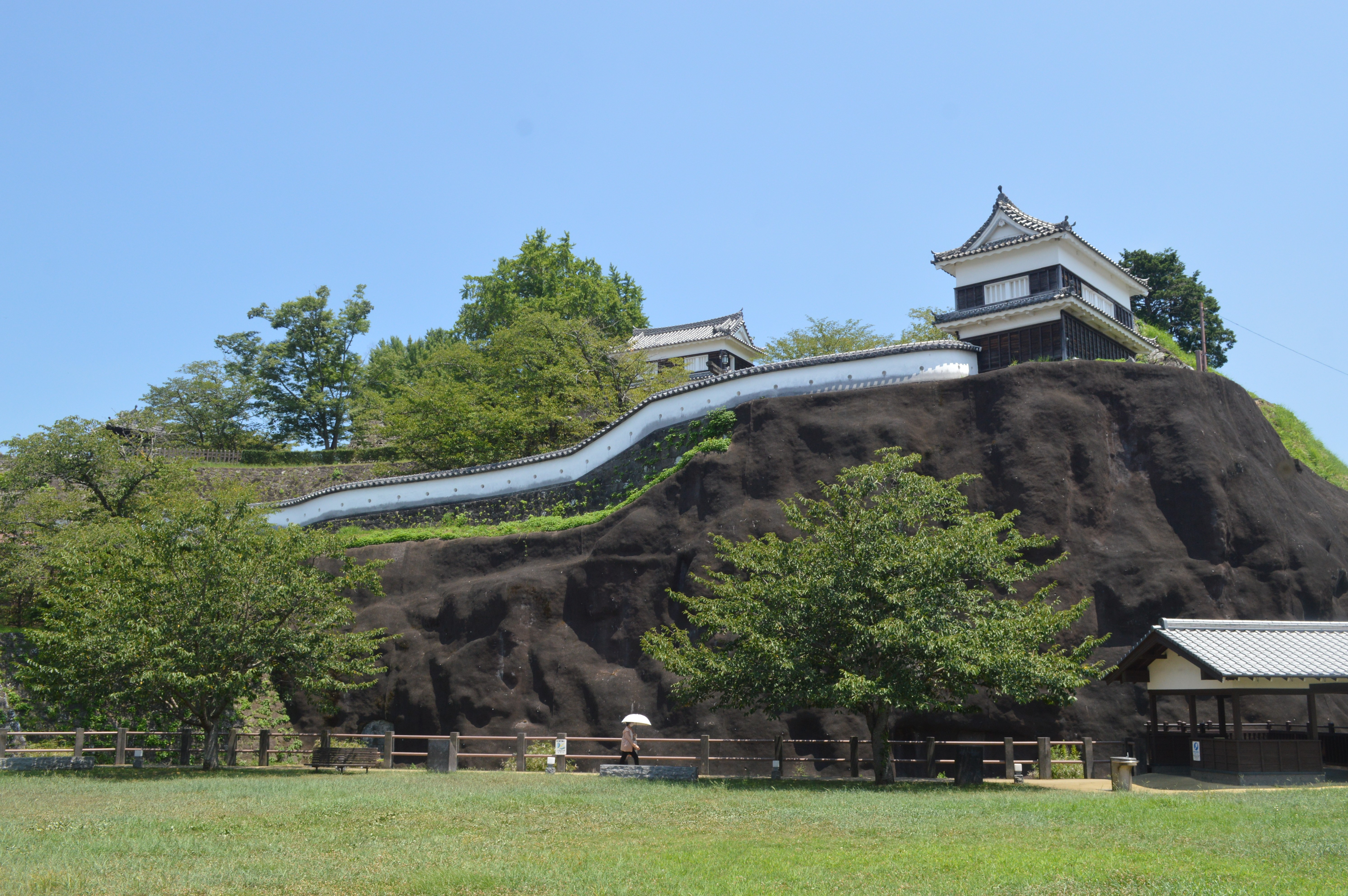
Ruin of Usuki castle

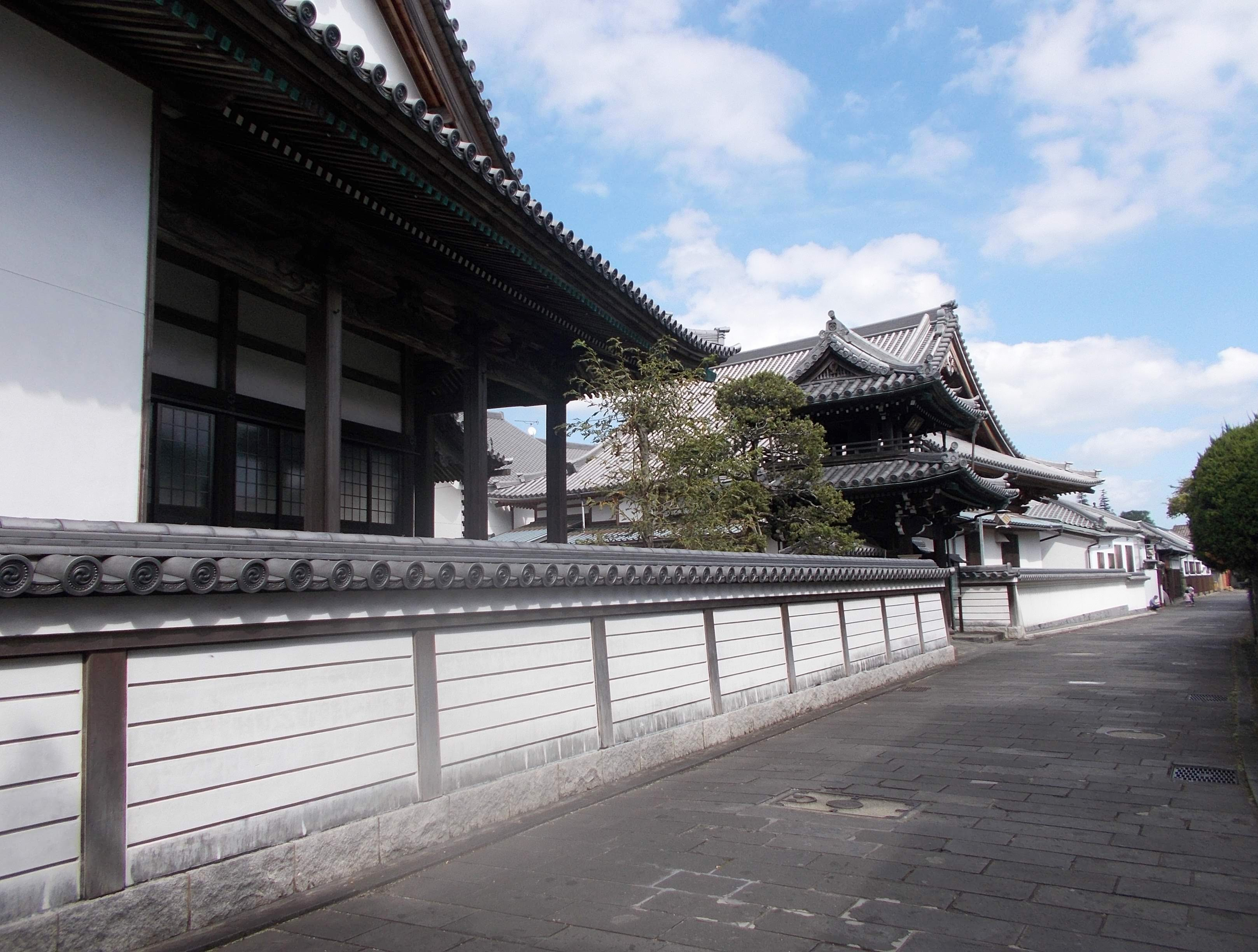
Nioza_Historical_Road, facing Zenshōji

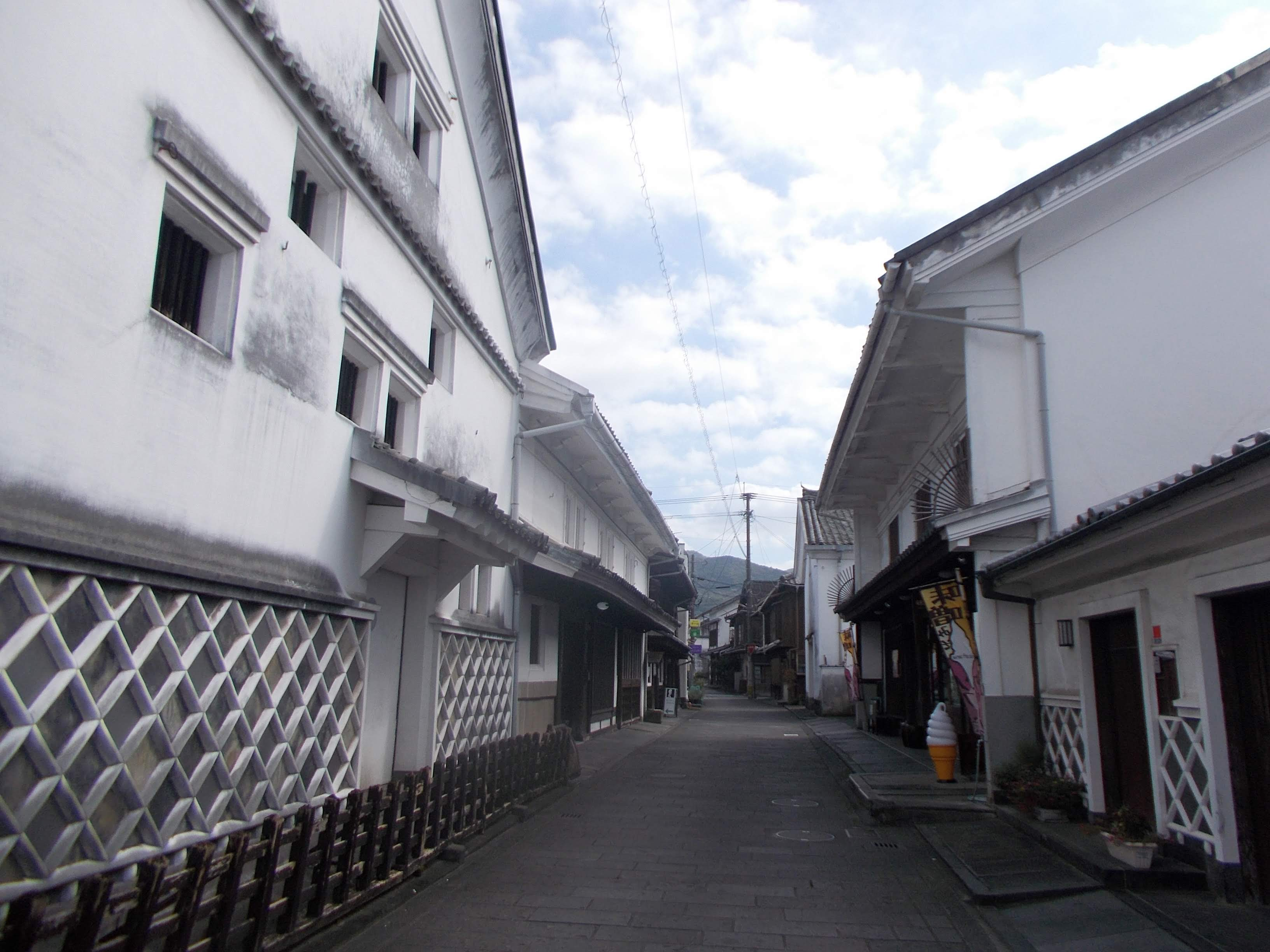
Kuge_no_Okura sake brewery

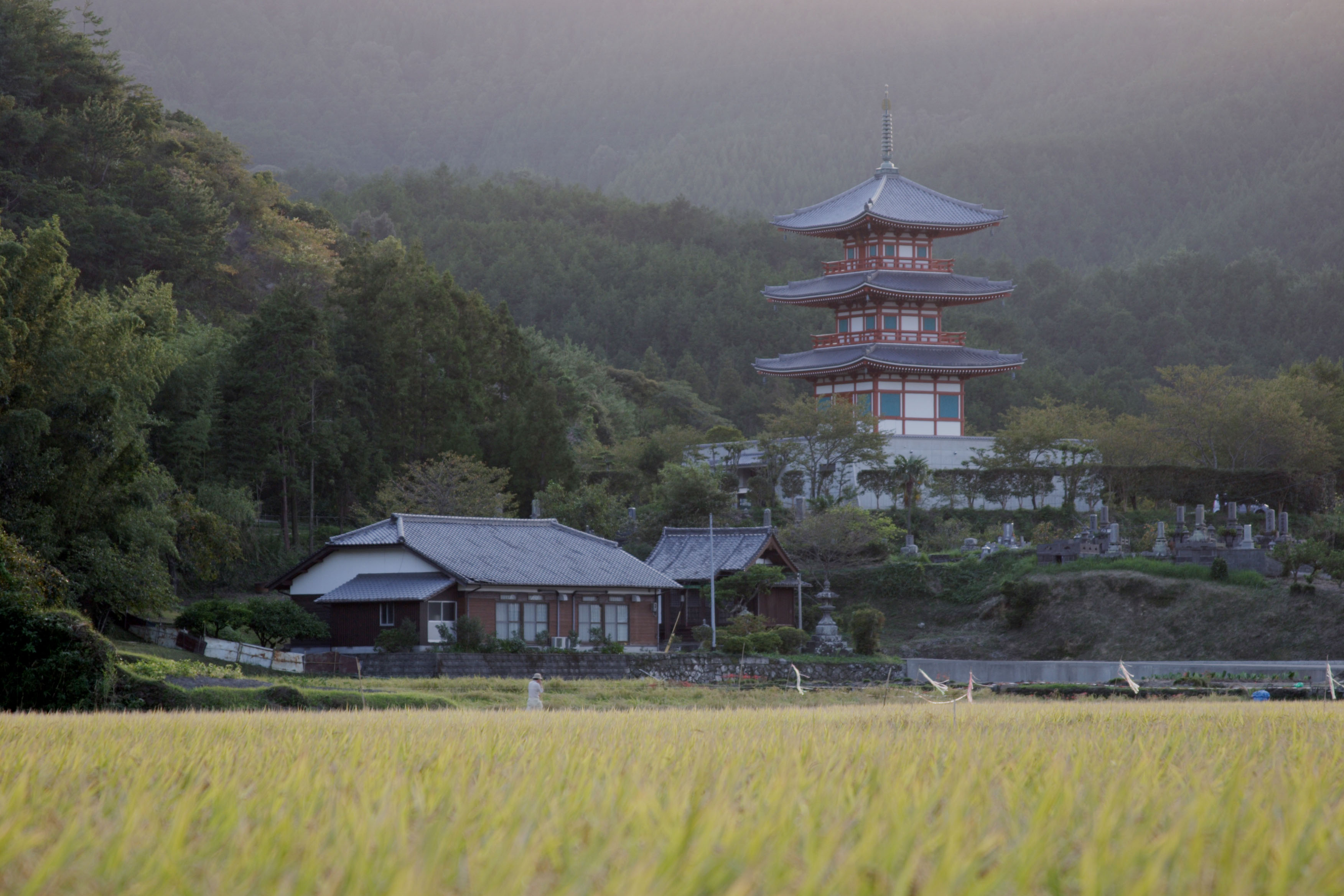
Zentoku-ji

=== Festivals ===
Major festivals in Usuki include the Usuki Gion Matsuri (mid July), Usuki Stone Buddhas Fire Festival (late August), and Usuki Bamboo Lantern Festival (early November). There are also festivities and celebrations during the cherry blossom blooming period in April, for example at Usuki Castle.

== Noted people from Usuki ==
- Jun Hirose, baseball player
- Maiko Itai, model and Miss Universe 2010
- Keiko Komuro, singer
- Masako Miura, voice actress
- Yaeko Nogami, novelist
- Hiromi Wada, baseball player and commentator
- Tatsuo Yamamoto, politician
- Tadatomo Yoshida, politician

== In popular culture ==
=== Movies set in Usuki ===
- なごり雪 (The Last Snow) (2002)
- 22才の別れ Lycoris 葉見ず花見ず物語 (Exchange Students - Goodbye to You) (2007)
