= Kami-Usuki Station =

Railway station in Usuki, Ōita Prefecture, Japan

Kami-Usuki Station 上臼杵駅
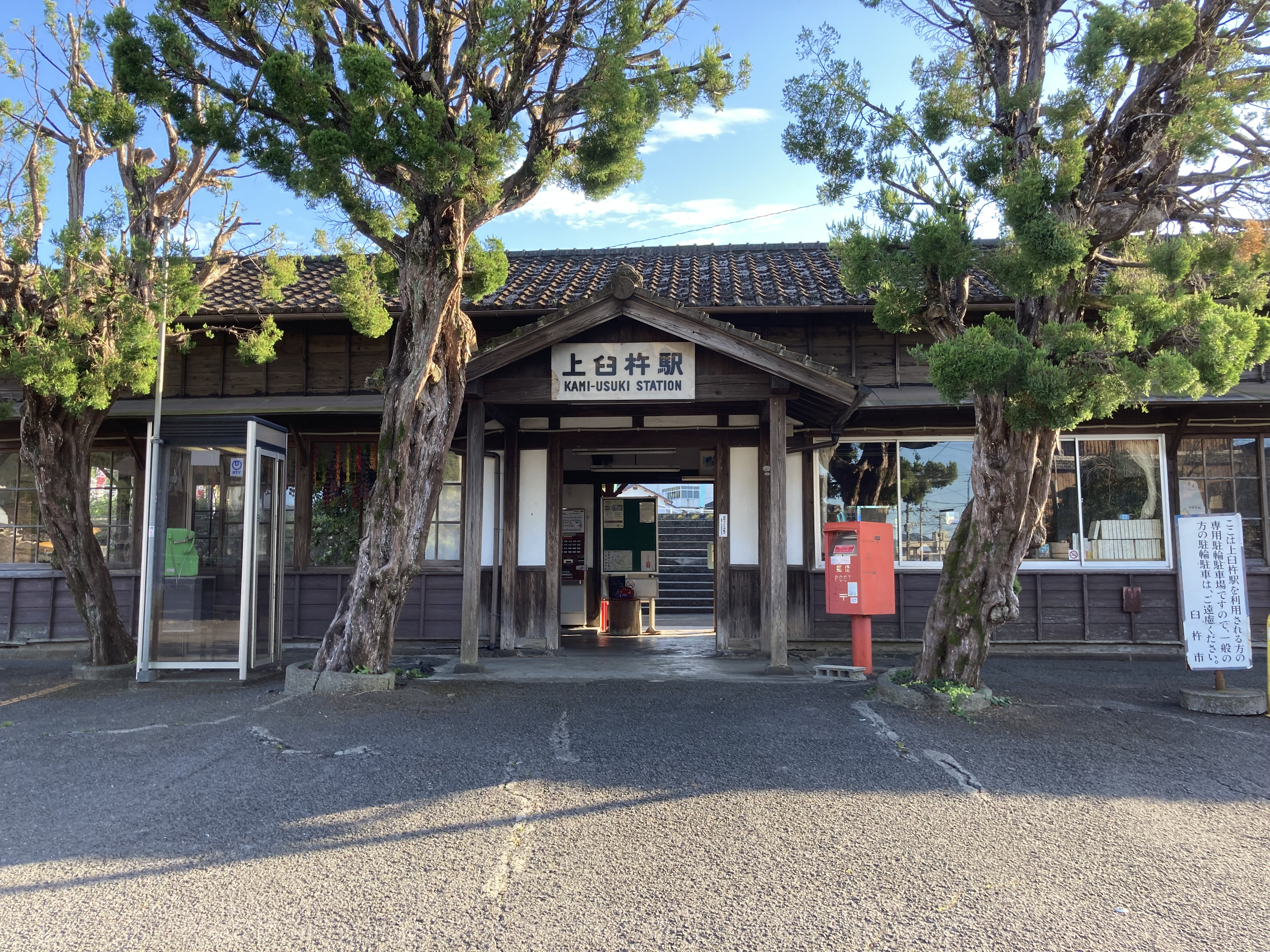
- Kami-Usuki Station in October 2021

General information
- Location: 1829-3 Fukura, Usuki-shi, Ōita-ken 875-0053; Japan
- Coordinates: 33°06′45″N 131°47′35″E
- Operator: JR Kyushu
- Line: ■ Nippō Main Line
- Distance: 167.6 km from Kokura
- Platforms: 1 side platform
- Tracks: 1

Construction
- Structure type: At grade
- Cycle facilities: Designated parking area for bicycles
- Accessible: No - steps lead up to platform

Other information
- Status: Unstaffed
- Website: Official website

History
- Opened: 18 July 1917

Passengers
- FY2016: 360 daily
- Rank: 283rd (among JR Kyushu stations)

Services
Preceding station	JR Kyushu	Following station
Kumasaki towards Kagoshima	Nippō Main Line	Usuki towards Kokura
Location
- Location within Oita Prefecture Location within Japan

Kami-Usuki Station (上臼杵駅, Kami-Usuki-eki) is a passenger railway station located in the city of Usuki, Ōita, Japan. It is operated by JR Kyushu.

== Lines ==
The station is served by the Nippō Main Line and is located 167.6 km from the starting point of the line at Kokura.

== Layout ==
The station consists of a side platform serving a single track at grade. The station building is a timber structure of traditional Japanese design. It is unstaffed and serves only to house a waiting area and an automatic ticket vending machine. After the ticket gate, a short flight of steps leads up to the platform where a separate wooden shed is provided as a weather shelter.

== History ==
Japanese Government Railways (JGR) opened the station on 18 July 1917 as an additional station on the existing track of what was then its Hōshū Main Line, subsequently renamed the Nippō Main Line on 15 December 1923. With the privatization of Japanese National Railways (JNR), the successor of JGR, on 1 April 1987, the station came under the control of JR Kyushu.

The station became unstaffed on 14 March 2015.

== Passenger statistics ==
In fiscal 2016, the station was used by an average of 360 passengers daily (boarding passengers only), and it ranked 283rd among the busiest stations of JR Kyushu.

== Surrounding area ==
- Japan National Route 217
- Usuki City Fukuragaoka Elementary School
- Usuki Stone Buddhas

== See also ==
- List of railway stations in Japan
