= Usuki Stone Buddhas =

- 臼杵磨崖仏 (Japanese)
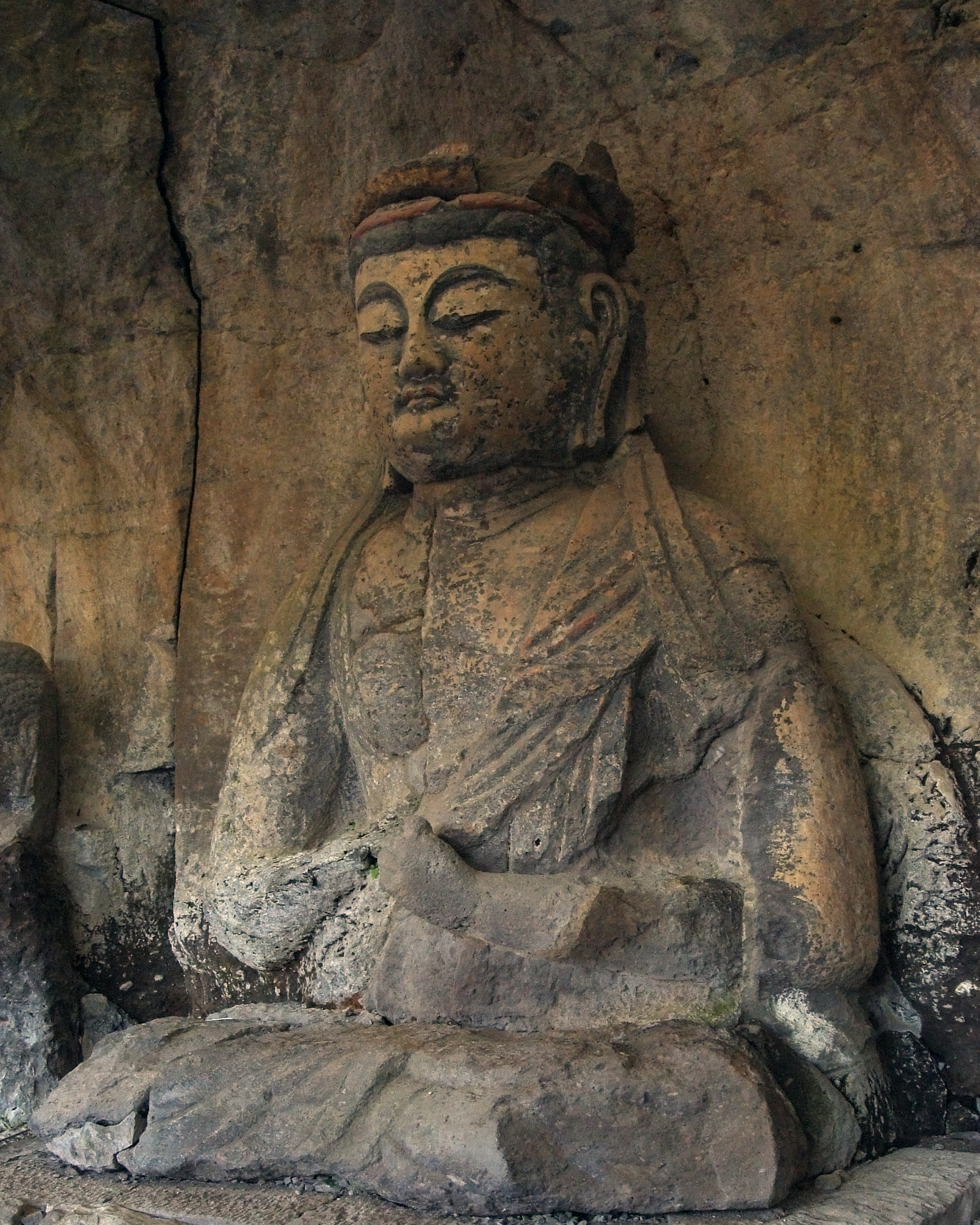
- Usuki Stone Buddhas

- Usuki Stone Buddhas Usuki Stone Buddhas (Japan)
- Interactive map of Usuki Stone Buddhas
- 33°5′25.8″N 131°45′45.5″E
- Periods: Heian-Kamakura period
- Location: Usuki, Ōita, Japan
- Region: Kyushu

Site notes
- Public access: Yes

National Treasure of Japan

The Usuki Stone Buddhas (臼杵磨崖仏, Usuki magaibutsu) is a group of 61 religious statues in four groups carved in bas-relief into a tuff cliff in the city of Usuki, Ōita Prefecture on the island of Kyushu, Japan. The site was designated a National Special Historic Site of Japan in 1952. In 1962, 59 of the 61 statues were collectively designated a National Important Cultural Property, with the designation elevated in 1995 to National Treasure.

== Overview ==
Constructing Buddha statues out of stone is widely practiced in Buddhist areas in Asia. These images can be divided into three broad types: Magaibutsu (磨崖仏; literally "polished-cliff Buddha"), bas-relief images carved directly into a cliff face, movable independent stone Buddhas carved from cut stone, and Buddhas carved inside rock caves, The Usuki images can be classed as Magaibutsu.

There are no historical materials remaining that testify to the period or circumstances surrounding the construction of these statues. According to the local legend of Manano Chōja ("The Legend of Sumiyaki Kogōrō"), these carved stone Buddhas are said to have been carved by a local magnate to mourn his deceased daughter, and since Emperor Yōmei appears in this legend, the setting of the story is in the latter half of the 6th century. However, based on the style, it is estimated that most of the statues were made in the late Heian period, and some in the Kamakura period. With the decline in Shugendō pilgrimages from the Muromachi period onward, the statues were forgotten and remained exposed to the elements, some of them possibly for over a thousand years. Carved into tuff formed by pyroclastic flows from Mount Aso, the stone statues are fragile, and during heavy rains, the path created by worshipers turned into a river that eroded many of the stone Buddhas. This is why the lower bodies of many of the statues are now missing, as if they have been cut off. Also, many of the Buddha's heads fell off due to the poor conditions. Among them, the head of the Dainichi Nyōrai statue in the most famous Koen Stone Buddha Group remained on a pedestal beneath the body of the Buddha until conservation and restoration was completed in 1993. During the restoration, a fierce debate arose between those who believed that the statue should be restored to its original state and those who were concerned about drastically changing the statue, which has become a symbol of Usuki. Restoration was demanded by the Ministry of Education as a condition for designation as a National Treasure, so it was eventually restored to its original location. The replica of the Buddha's head on the platform of Usuki Station was made before the restoration, and is a good representation of the state it was in when it was placed underfoot.

The surrounding topography, which had been a V-shaped valley, was destroyed during conservation and restoration work, and the portion of wall on which the stone Buddhas were not carved was cut down. Drainage facilities have been introduced around the carvings, so there is no longer any possibility of water flowing at the feet or underneath the stone statues. However, moss grows in the humid conditions behind the rocks, so measures are being taken to prevent this.

The site is approximately 4.5 kilometers southwest from Kami-Usuki Station on the JR Kyushu Nippō Main Line.

Koen Stone Buddha Group

The Koen Stone Buddha Group (古園石仏群) has a total of 13 statues, with a Dainichi Nyōrai seated statue in the center. On each side there are two Tathāgata statues, two Bodhisattva statues, one Myōō statue, and one Tenbu statue. There are various theories as to the specific identities of many of the statues in this composition.

Sannōzan Stone Buddha Group

The Sannōzan Stone Buddha Group (山王山石仏群) consists of three statues, with a seated statue of a Tathāgata in the center, and one smaller seated statue of Tathāgata on each side.

Hoki Stone Buddha Group 1

The Hoki Stone Buddha Group 1 (ホキ石仏第一群) is divided into four niches. Both the first and second niches of the left have three seated statues of the Tathāgata, and the first niche also has two standing statues of the Bodhisattvas. The third niche is centered around the seated statue of Dainichi Nyōrai, with one seated Tathāgata statue on each side, and one standing Bodhisattva statue on each side. The fourth niche is centered around a statue of Jizō Bodhisattva sitting with its left leg down, and statues of the Ten Kings of the Underworld are placed on either side of it. Of the above, the third and fourth niches appear to have been added to the Kamakura period. Additionally, there is a seated statue of Aizen Myōō between the first and second niches.

Hoki Stone Buddha Group 2

The Hoki Stone Buddha Group 2 (ホキ石仏第二群) consists of the two niches. The first niche is centered around the seated statue of Amida Nyorai, with standing statues of Bodhisattvas on either side. There is also a theory that the middle statue is a statue of Miroku Bosatsu. To the left of these are two Bodhisattva-shaped statues that have remained largely intact. The second niche is centered around nine statues of Amida Nyōrai, with a seated statue in the center, and four standing statues of Amida Nyōrai on each side. There is a standing Bodhisattva statue on each side of these, but the Bodhisattva statue on the left does not retain its original shape.

== Gallery ==
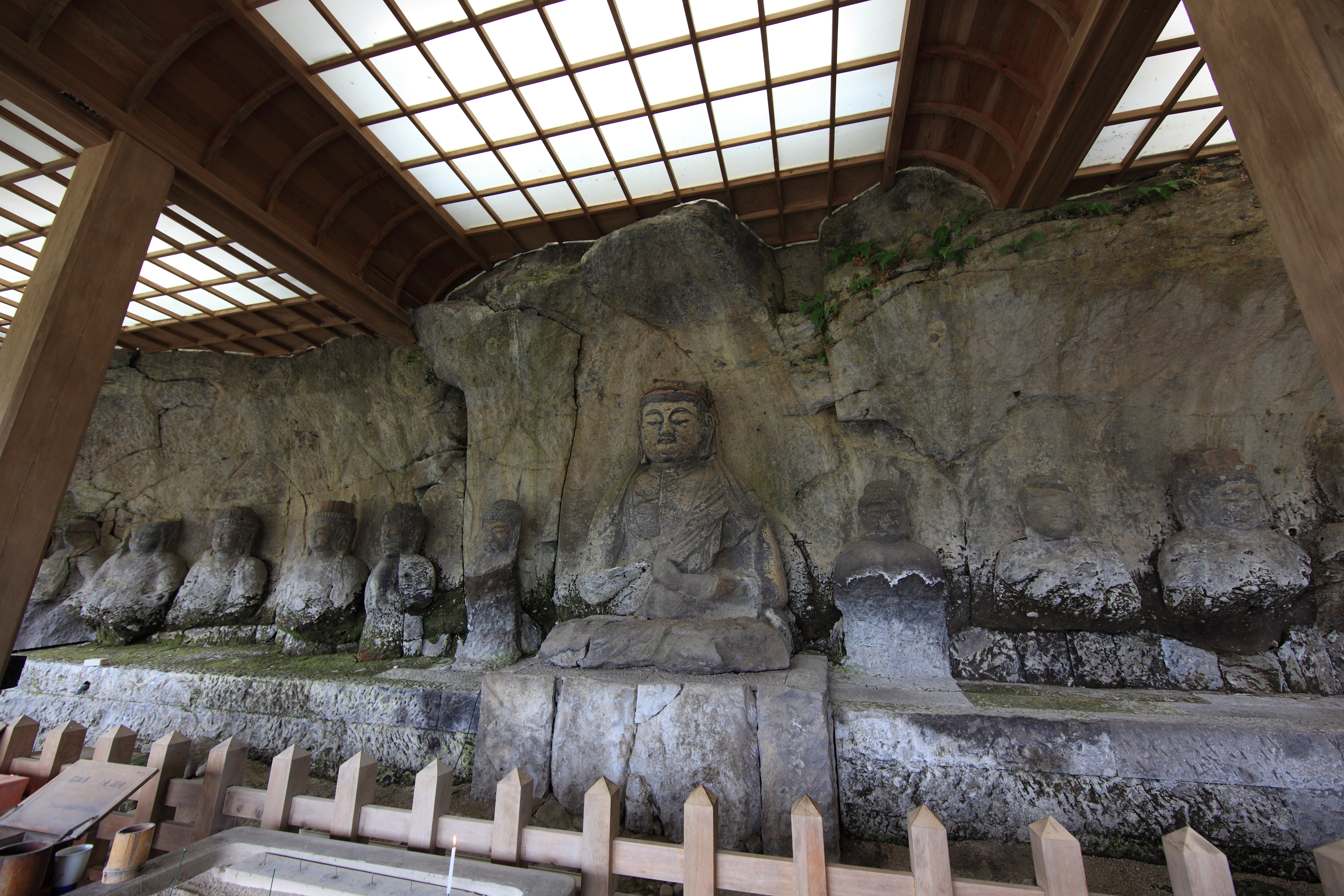
Koen Stone Buddha Group

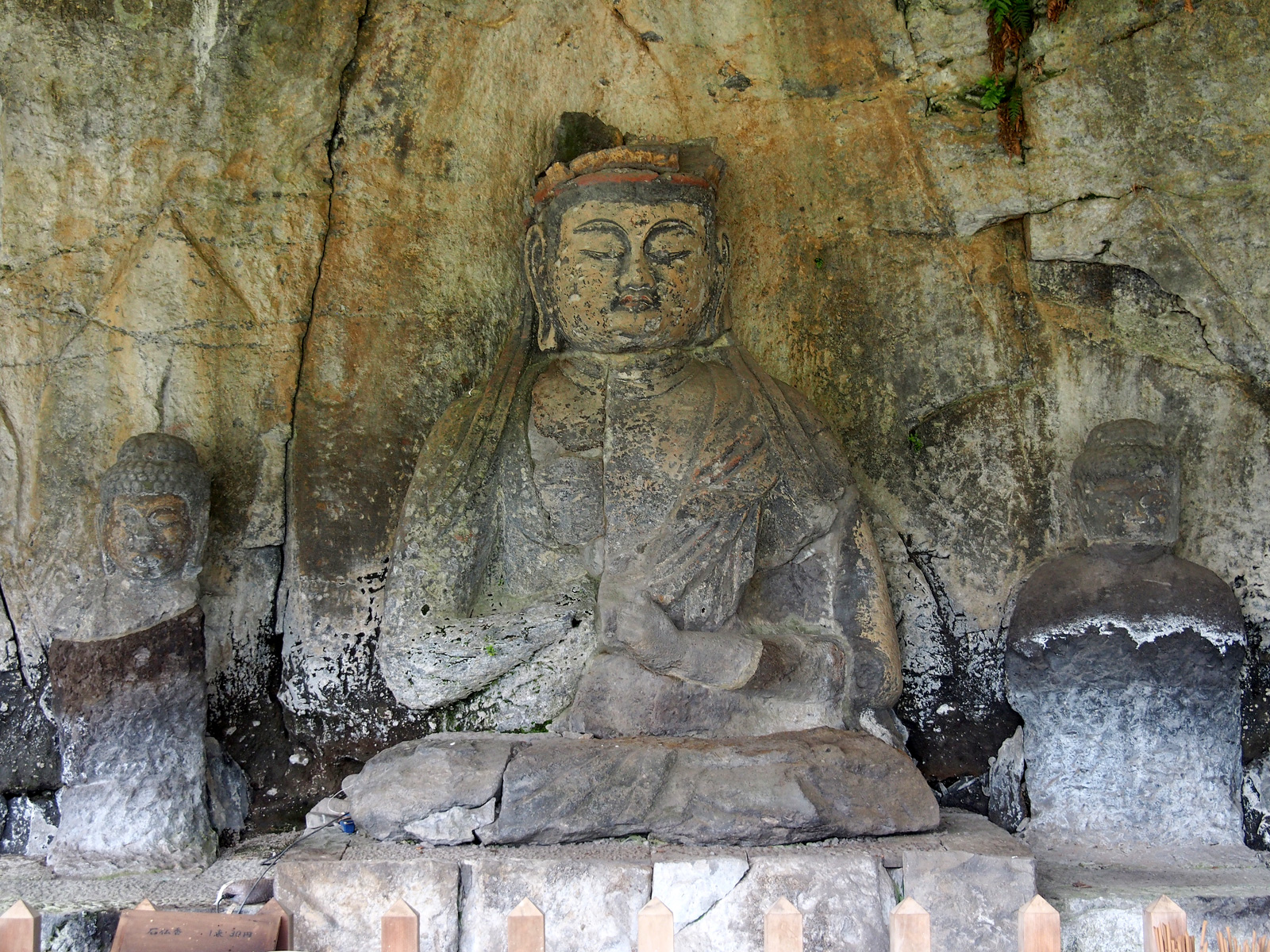
Koen Stone Buddha Group Dainichi Nyorai

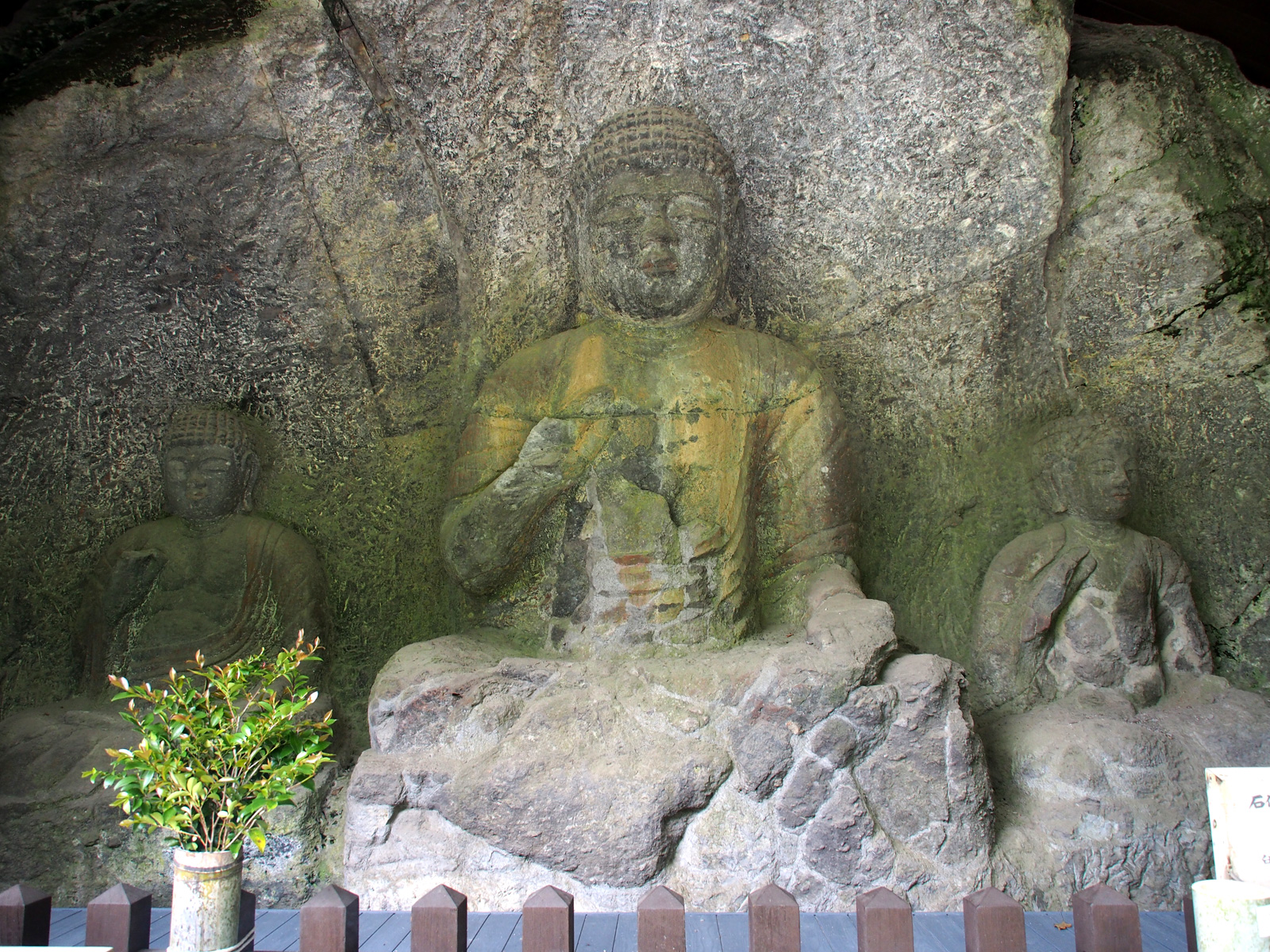
Sannozan Stone Buddha Group

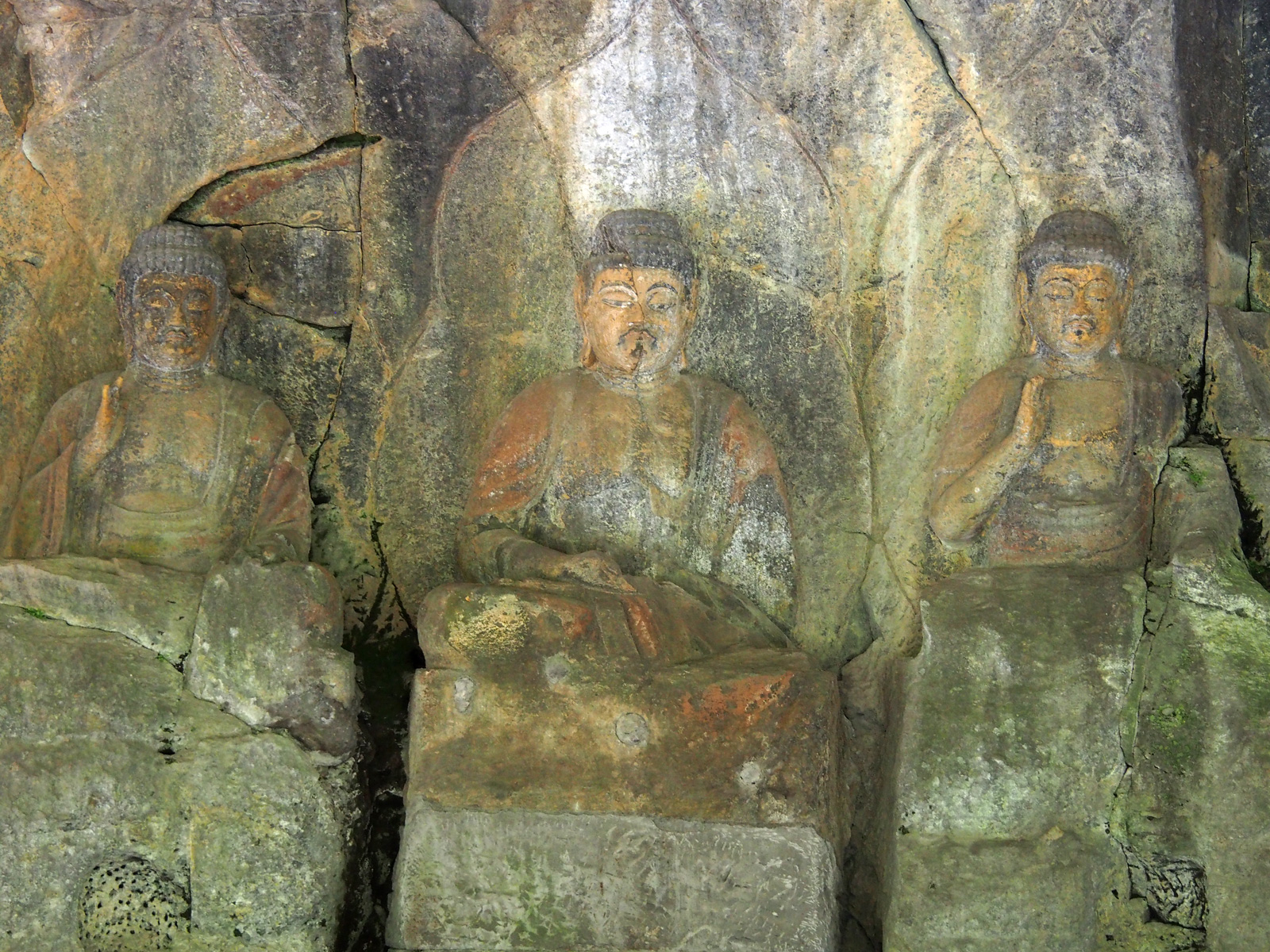
Hoki Stone Buddha Group 1, Niche 2

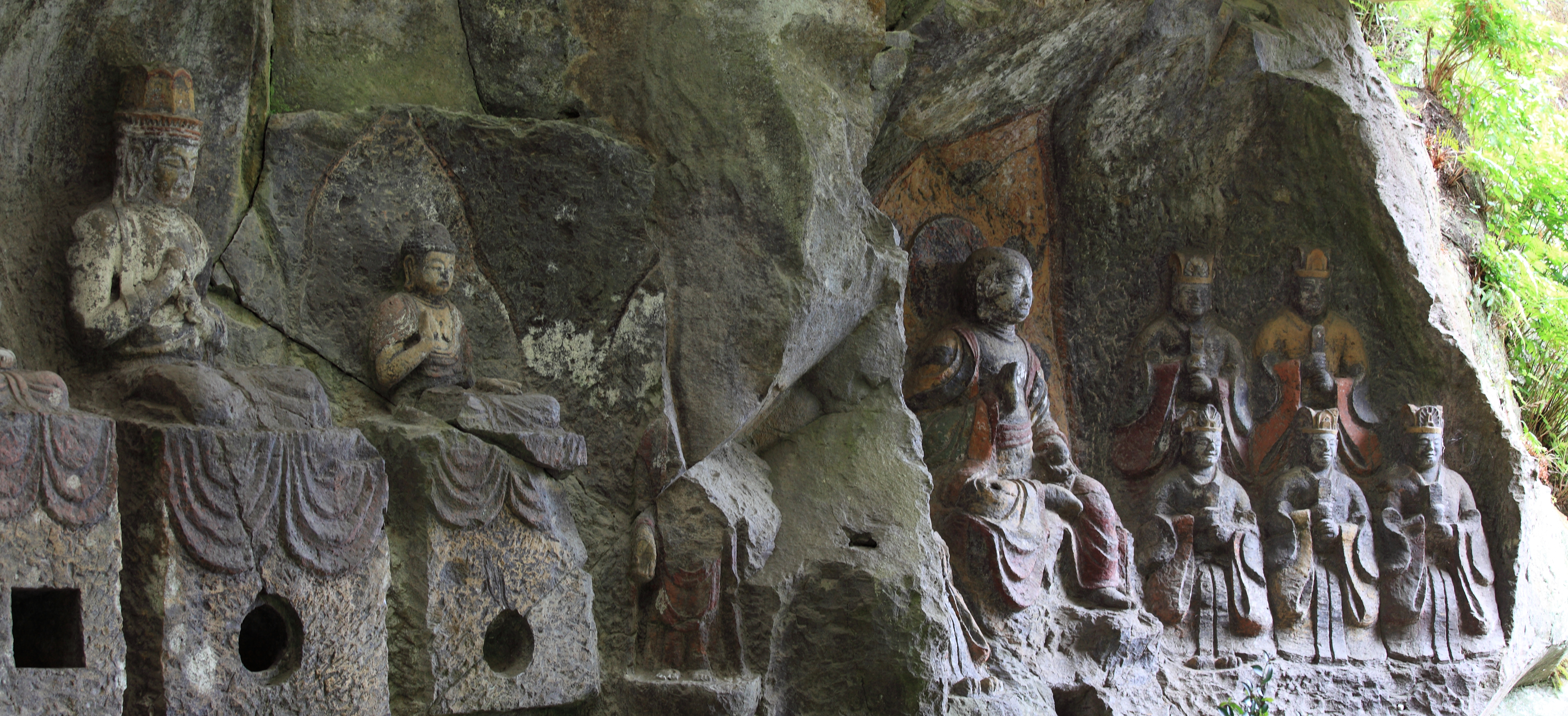
Hoki Stone Buddha Group 1, Niche 4

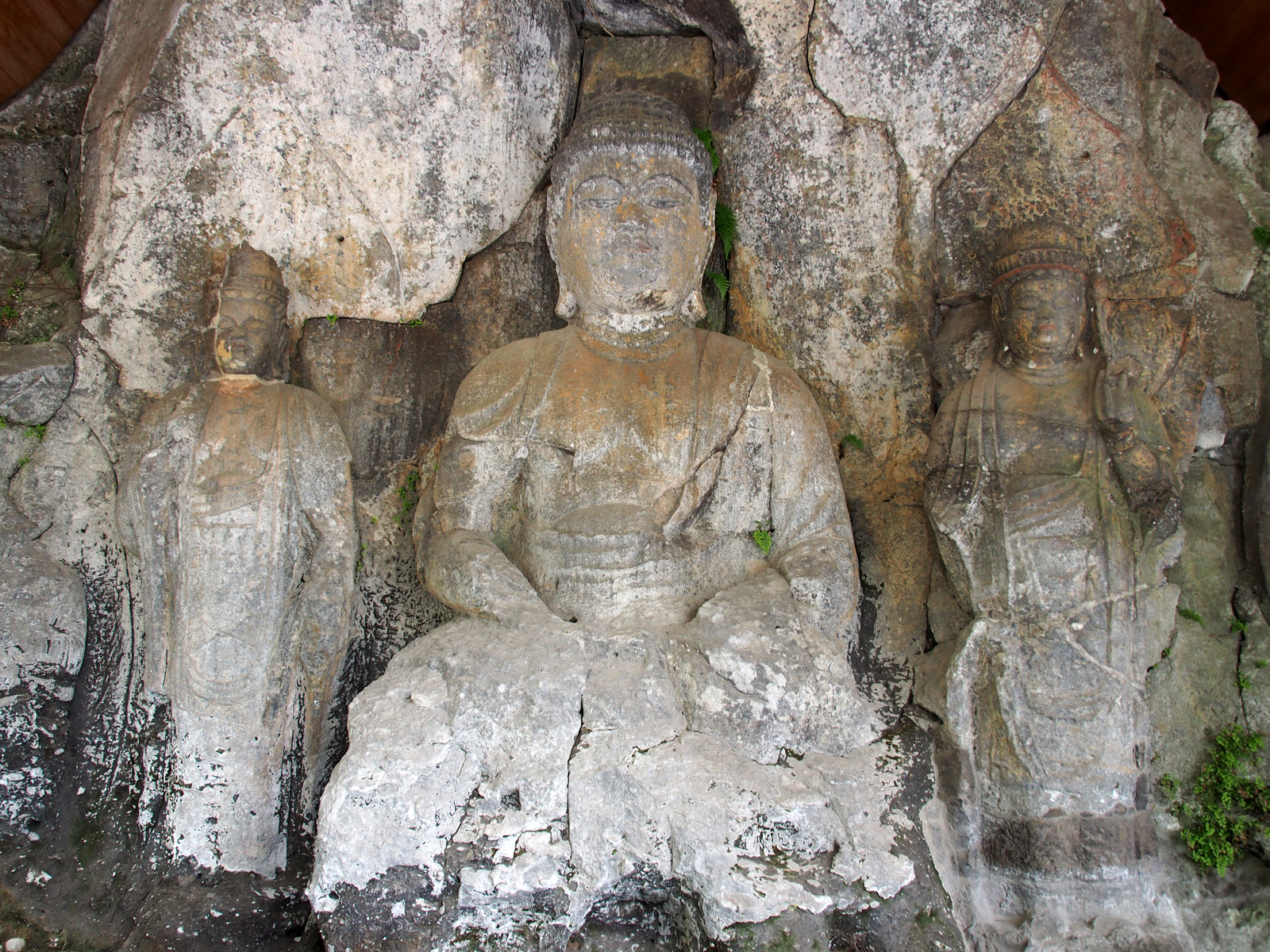
Hoki Stone Buddha Group 2

== See also ==
- List of Historic Sites of Japan (Ōita)
- List of National Treasures of Japan (sculptures)
- List of Special Places of Scenic Beauty, Special Historic Sites and Special Natural Monuments
