= Tsukumi Station =

Railway station in Tsukumi, Ōita Prefecture, Japan

Tsukumi Station 津久見駅
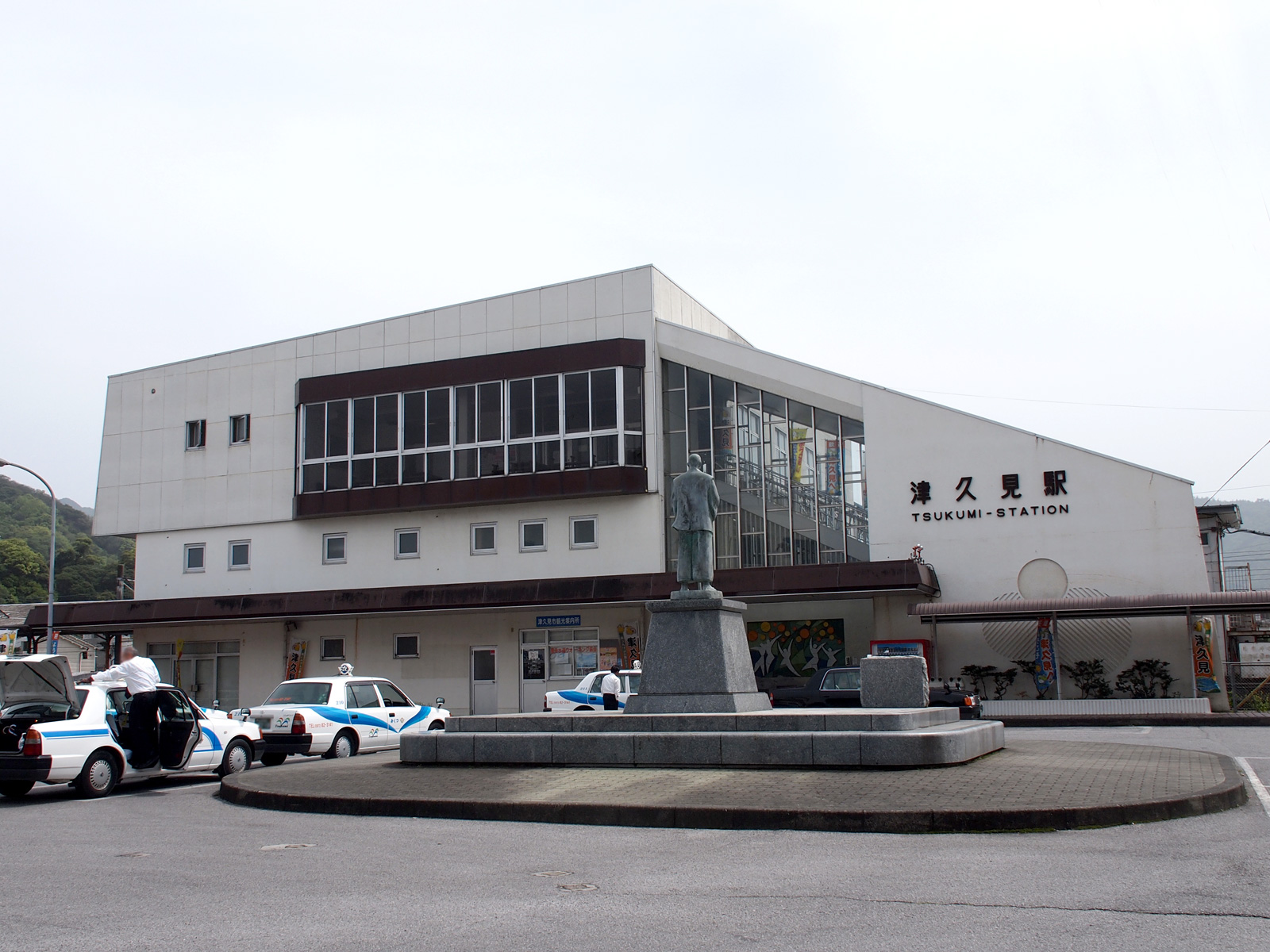
- Tsukumi Station in 2011

General information
- Location: 1 Chūōmachi, Tsukumi-shi, Ōita-ken 879-2441; Japan
- Coordinates: 33°04′22″N 131°51′50″E
- Operator: JR Kyushu
- Line: ■ Nippō Main Line
- Distance: 178.9 km from Kokura
- Platforms: 1 island platform
- Tracks: 2 + 1 passing loop and 1 siding

Construction
- Structure type: Elevated

Other information
- Status: Staffed ticket window (Midori no Madoguchi) (outsourced)
- Website: Official website

History
- Opened: 25 October 1916

Passengers
- FY2016: 878 daily
- Rank: 180th (among JR Kyushu stations)

Services
Preceding station	JR Kyushu	Following station
Hishiro towards Kagoshima	Nippō Main Line	Usuki towards Kokura
Location
- Location within Oita Prefecture Location within Japan

Tsukumi Station (津久見駅, Tsukumi-eki) is a passenger railway station located in the city of Tsukumi, Ōita, Japan. It is operated by JR Kyushu.

== Lines ==
The station is served by the Nippō Main Line and is located 178.9 km from the starting point of the line at Kokura.

== Layout ==
The station has an island platform serving two tracks at grade. A passing loop and a siding branch off track 2. The station building is a modern concrete hashigami structure where the passenger facilities such as the station concourse, a staffed ticket window and waiting area are located on level 2 on a bridge which spans the tracks. The bridge also leads to a second entrance on the south side of the tracks.

Management of the passenger facilities at the station has been outsourced to the JR Kyushu Tetsudou Eigyou Co., a wholly owned subsidiary of JR Kyushu specialising in station services. It staffs the ticket booth which is equipped with a Midori no Madoguchi facility.

=== Platforms ===
1	■ ■ Nippō Main Line	for Saiki and Nobeoka
2	■ ■ Nippō Main Line	for Ōita and Kokura

== History ==
The private Kyushu Railway had, by 1909, through acquisition and its own expansion, established a track from Kokura to Yanagigaura. The Kyushu Railway was nationalised on 1 July 1907. Japanese Government Railways (JGR), designated the track as the Hōshū Main Line on 12 October 1909 and expanded it southwards in phases, with Saiki opening as the new southern terminus on 25 October 1916. On the same day, Tsukumi was opened as an intermediate station on the new track. On 15 December 1923, the Hōshū Main Line was renamed the Nippō Main Line. With the privatization of Japanese National Railways (JNR), the successor of JGR, on 1 April 1987, the station came under the control of JR Kyushu.

== Passenger statistics ==
In fiscal 2016, the station was used by an average of 878 passengers daily (boarding passengers only), and it ranked 180th among the busiest stations of JR Kyushu.

== Surrounding area ==
- Tsukumi City Hall
- Japan National Route 217
- Oita Prefectural Tsukumi High School

== See also ==
- List of railway stations in Japan
