= Minami-Kagoshima Station =

Railway station in Kagoshima, Kagoshima Prefecture, Japan

Minami-Kagoshima Station 南鹿児島駅
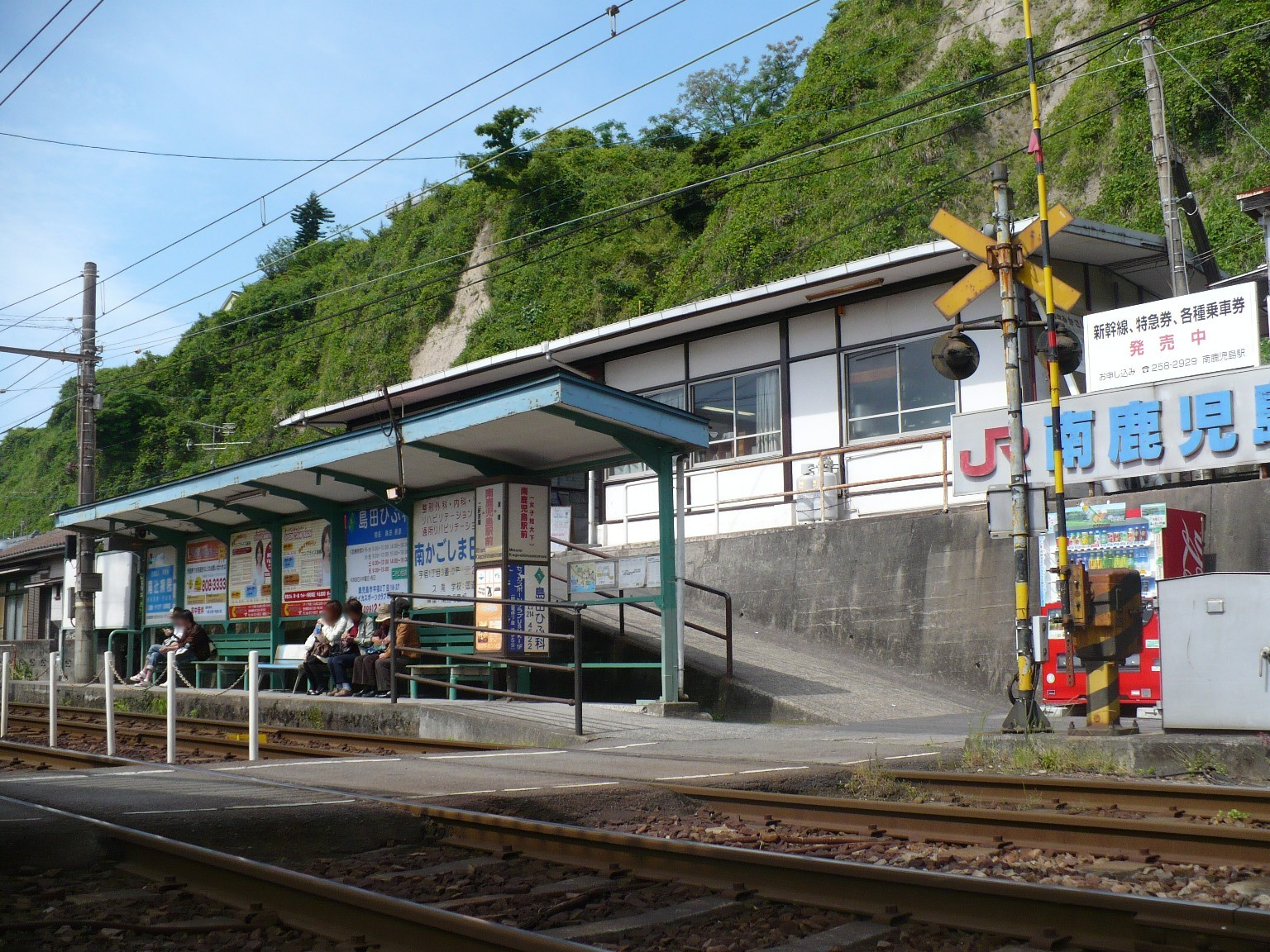
- Minami-Kagoshima Station

General information
- Location: 27-18 Minamikōrimotochō, Kagoshima-shi, Kagoshima-ken 891-0069; Japan
- Coordinates: 31°33′19.40″N 130°32′38.39″E
- Operator: JR Kyushu
- Line: ■ Ibusuki Makurazaki Line
- Distance: 3.5 km from Kagoshima-Chūō
- Platforms: 1 island platform

Other information
- Status: Unstaffed
- Website: Official website

History
- Opened: 1 October 1944

Passengers
- FY2020: 461 daily

Services
Preceding station	JR Kyushu	Following station
Kōrimoto towards Kagoshima-Chūō	Ibusuki Makurazaki Line	Usuki towards Makurazaki
Location
- Location within Kagoshima Prefecture Location within Japan

Minami-Kagoshima Station (南鹿児島駅, Minami-Kagoshima-eki) is a passenger railway station located in the city of Kagoshima, Kagoshima Prefecture, Japan. It is operated by JR Kyushu.

== Lines ==
The station is served by the Ibusuki Makurazaki Line and is located 3.5 km from the starting point of the line at Kagoshima-Chūō.

== Layout ==
This is an above-ground station with one island platform, connected to the station building by a level crossing. The station is unattended.

=== Platforms ===
1	■ Ibusuki Makurazaki Line	for Ibusuki and Makurazaki
2	■ Ibusuki Makurazaki Line	for Kagoshima-Chūō

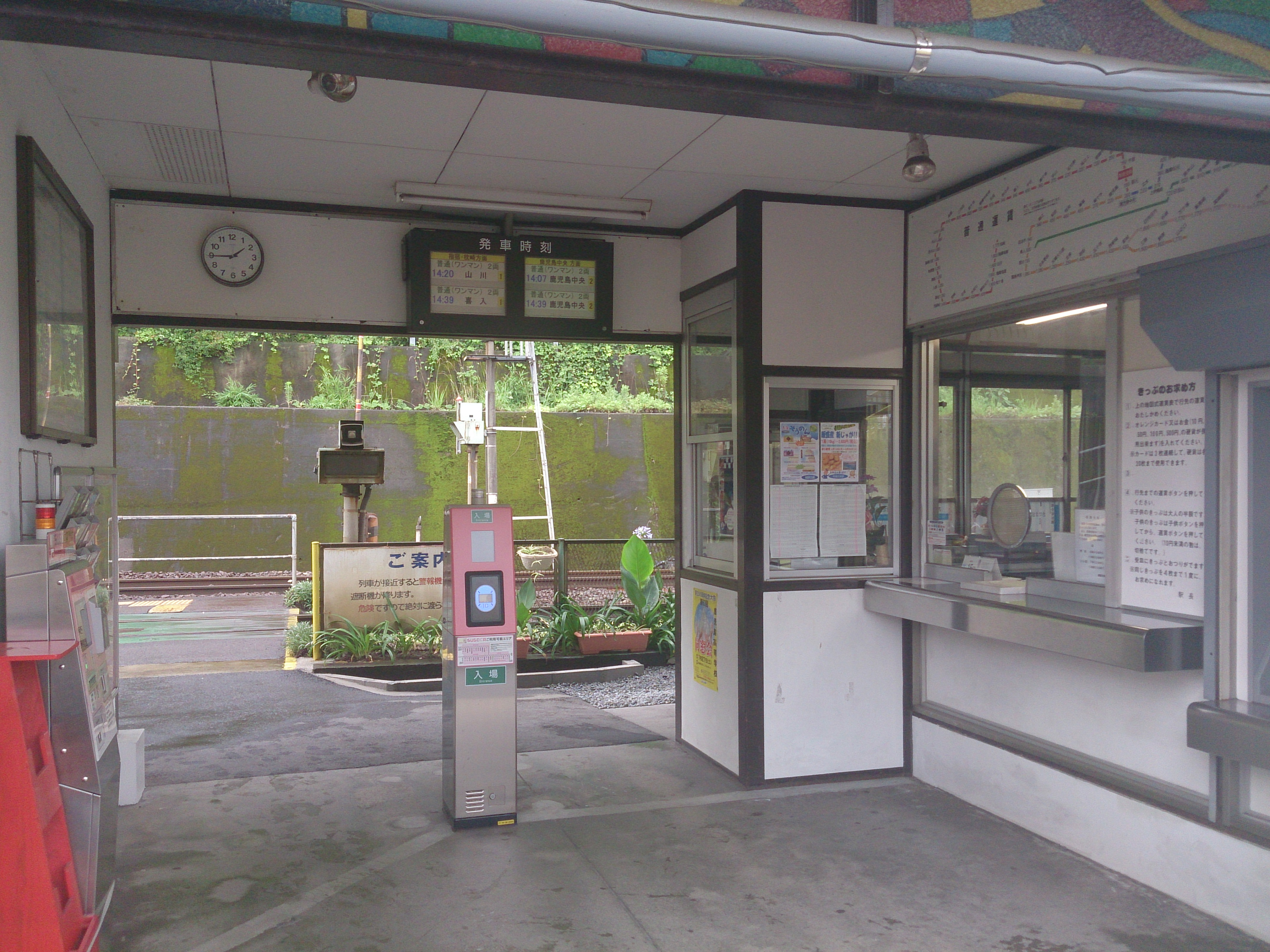
Exit Gate

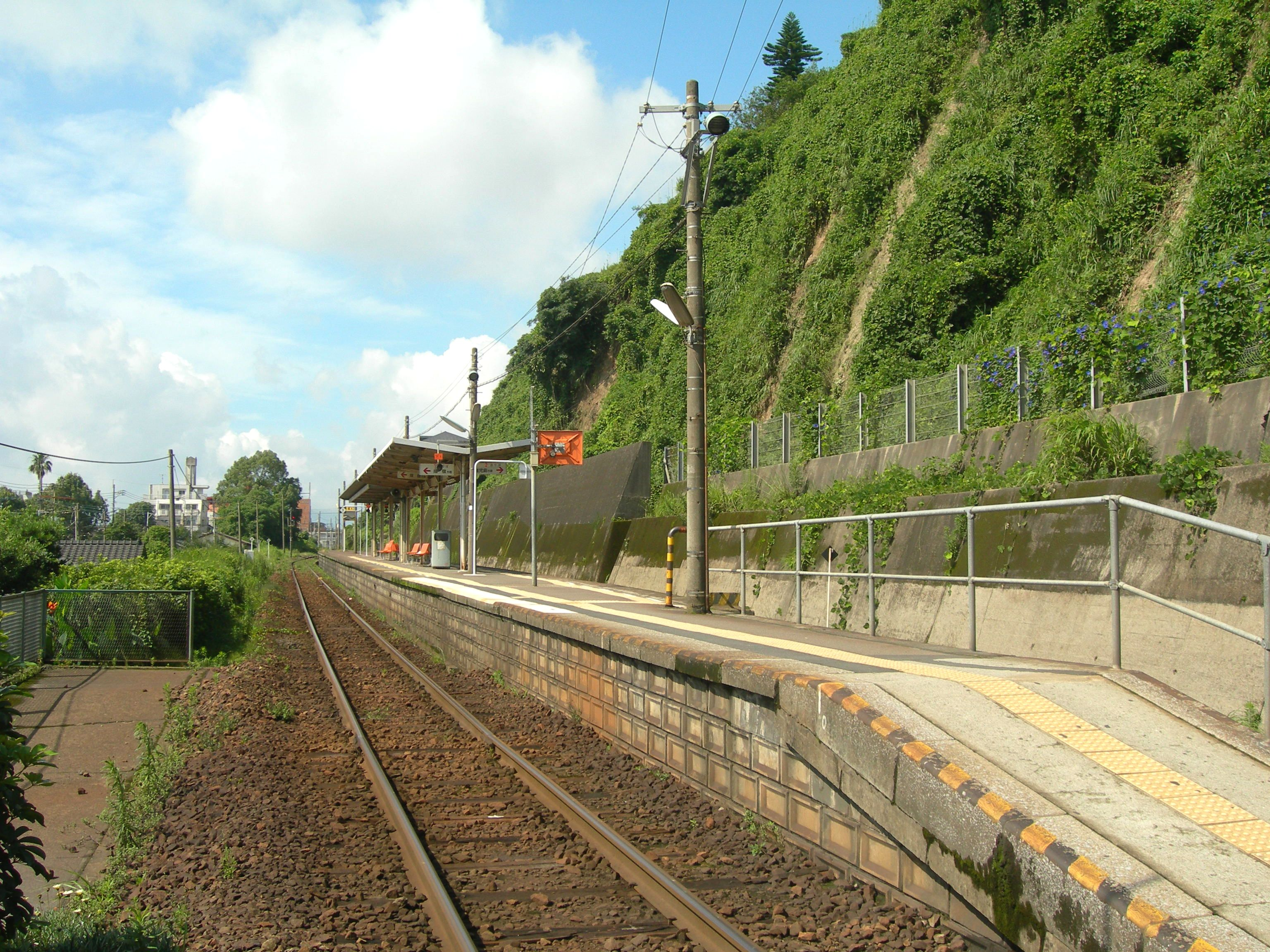
Platform

== History ==
Japanese Government Railways (JGR) had opened this station on 1 October 1944. On 31 October 1963, the line which served the station was renamed the Ibusuki Makurazaki Line. With the privatization of Japanese National Railways (JNR), the successor of JGR, on 1 April 1987, the station came under the control of JR Kyushu.

== Passenger statistics ==
In fiscal 2020, the station was used by an average of 1214 passengers daily (boarding passengers only), and it ranked 120th among the busiest stations of JR Kyushu.

== Surrounding area ==
- Shigakukan Junior High School & High School
- Shigakukan University
- Minami Junior High School
- Kagoshima Women's Junior College

== See also ==
- List of railway stations in Japan
