= Sashiu Station =

Railway station in Usuki, Ōita Prefecture, Japan

Sashiu Station 佐志生駅
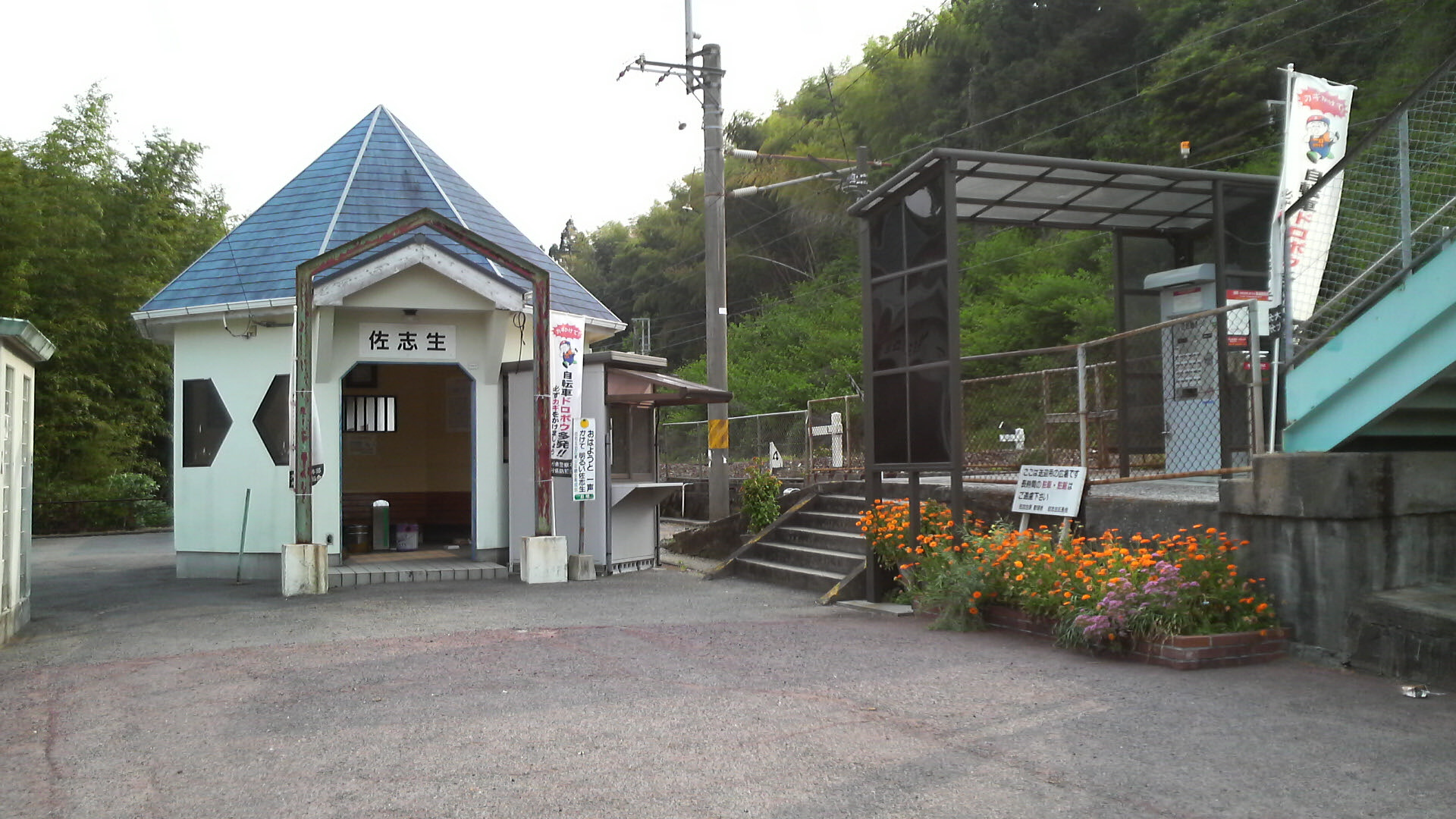
- Sashiu Station in 2008

General information
- Location: Sashiu, Usuki-shi, Ōita-ken 875-0001; Japan
- Coordinates: 33°10′28″N 131°49′04″E
- Operator: JR Kyushu
- Line: ■ Nippō Main Line
- Distance: 159.0 km from Kokura
- Platforms: 1 island platform
- Tracks: 2

Construction
- Structure type: Side hill cutting
- Cycle facilities: Bike shed
- Accessible: No - island platform accessed by footbridge

Other information
- Status: Unstaffed
- Website: Official website

History
- Opened: 1 October 1947

Passengers
- FY2015: 66 daily

Services
Preceding station	JR Kyushu	Following station
Shitanoe towards Kagoshima	Nippō Main Line	Kōzaki towards Kokura
Location
- Location within Oita Prefecture Location within Japan

Sashiu Station (佐志生駅, Sashiu-eki) is a passenger railway station located in the city of Usuki, Ōita, Japan. It is operated by JR Kyushu.

== Lines ==
The station is served by the Nippō Main Line and is located 159.0 km from the starting point of the line at Kokura.

== Layout ==
The station, which is not staffed, consists of an island platform serving two tracks on a side hill cutting. There is no station building but a simple hexagonal shed has been set up as a waiting room. A shelter housing an automatic ticket vending machine is also provided at the station entrance. Access to island platform is by means of a footbridge. A bike shed is provided near the station entrance.

=== Platforms ===
1	■ ■ Nippō Main Line	for Saiki
2	■ ■ Nippō Main Line	for Ōita

== History ==
Japanese Government Railways (JGR) opened the station on 1 October 1947 as an additional station on the existing track of its Nippō Main Line. With the privatization of Japanese National Railways (JNR), the successor of JGR, on 1 April 1987, the station came under the control of JR Kyushu.

== Passenger statistics ==
In fiscal 2015, there were a total of 24,101 boarding passengers, giving a daily average of 66 passengers.

== Surrounding area ==
- Sashiu port

== See also ==
- List of railway stations in Japan
