= Usuki Station (Kagoshima) =

Railway station in Kagoshima, Kagoshima Prefecture, Japan

Usuki Station 宇宿駅
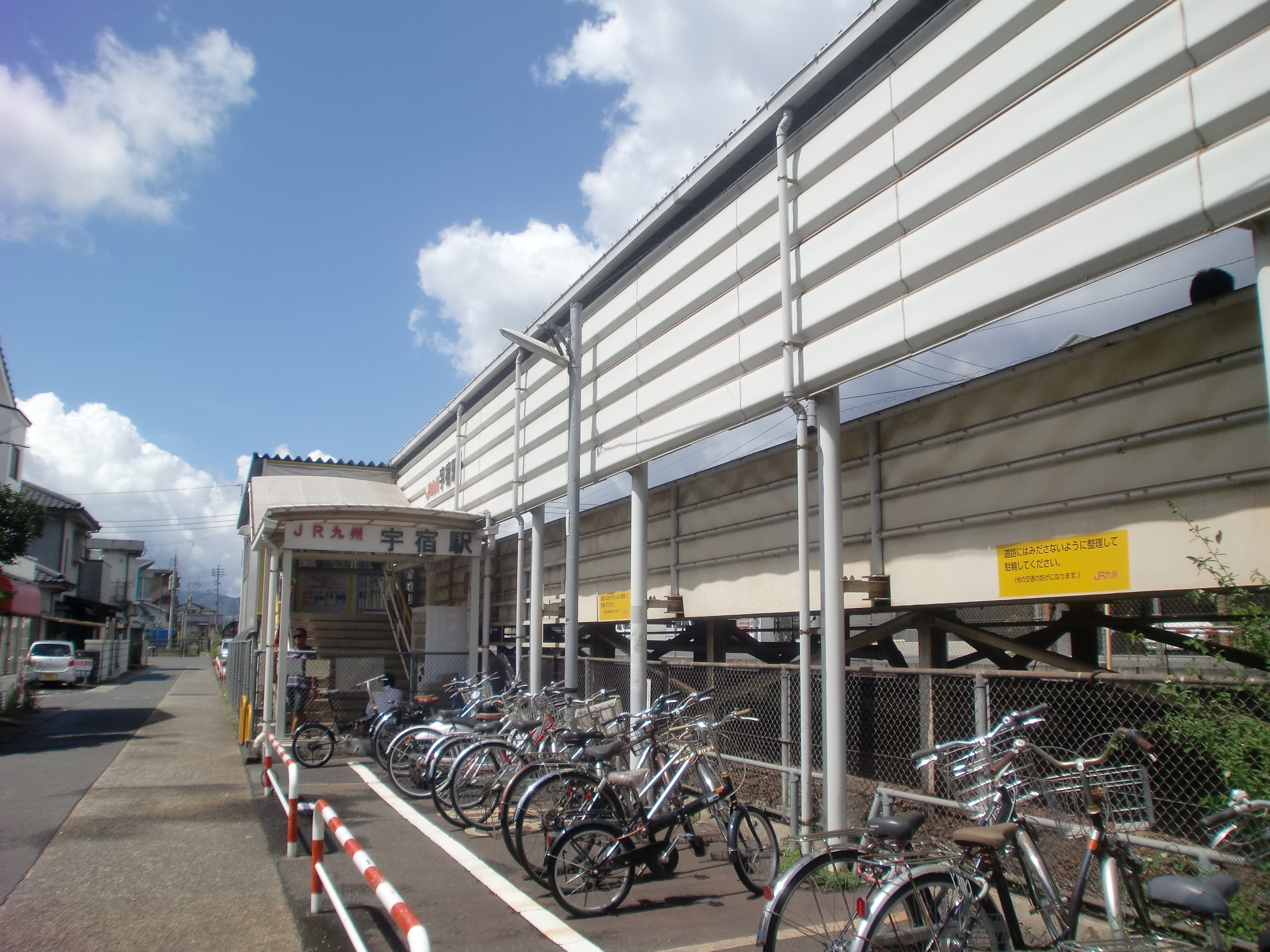
- Usuki Station

General information
- Location: Usuki 3-chome, Kagoshima-shi, Kagoshima-ken 890-0073; Japan
- Coordinates: 31°32′38.99″N 130°32′10.90″E
- Operator: JR Kyushu
- Line: ■ Ibusuki Makurazaki Line
- Distance: 4.9 km from Kagoshima-Chūō
- Platforms: 1 side platform

Other information
- Status: Unstaffed
- Website: Official website

History
- Opened: 1 December 1986

Passengers
- FY2020: 1013 daily

Services
Preceding station	JR Kyushu	Following station
Minami-Kagoshima towards Kagoshima-Chūō	Ibusuki Makurazaki Line	Taniyama towards Makurazaki
Location
- Location within Kagoshima Prefecture Location within Japan

Usuki Station (宇宿駅, Usuki-eki) is a passenger railway station located in the city of Kagoshima, Kagoshima Prefecture, Japan. It is operated by JR Kyushu. The station appears in the manga Go!! Southern Ice Hockey Club by Kōji Kumeta.

== Lines ==
The station is served by the Ibusuki Makurazaki Line and is located 4.9 km from the starting point of the line at Kagoshima-Chūō.

== Layout ==
This is an above-ground station with one side platform. The station is unattended.

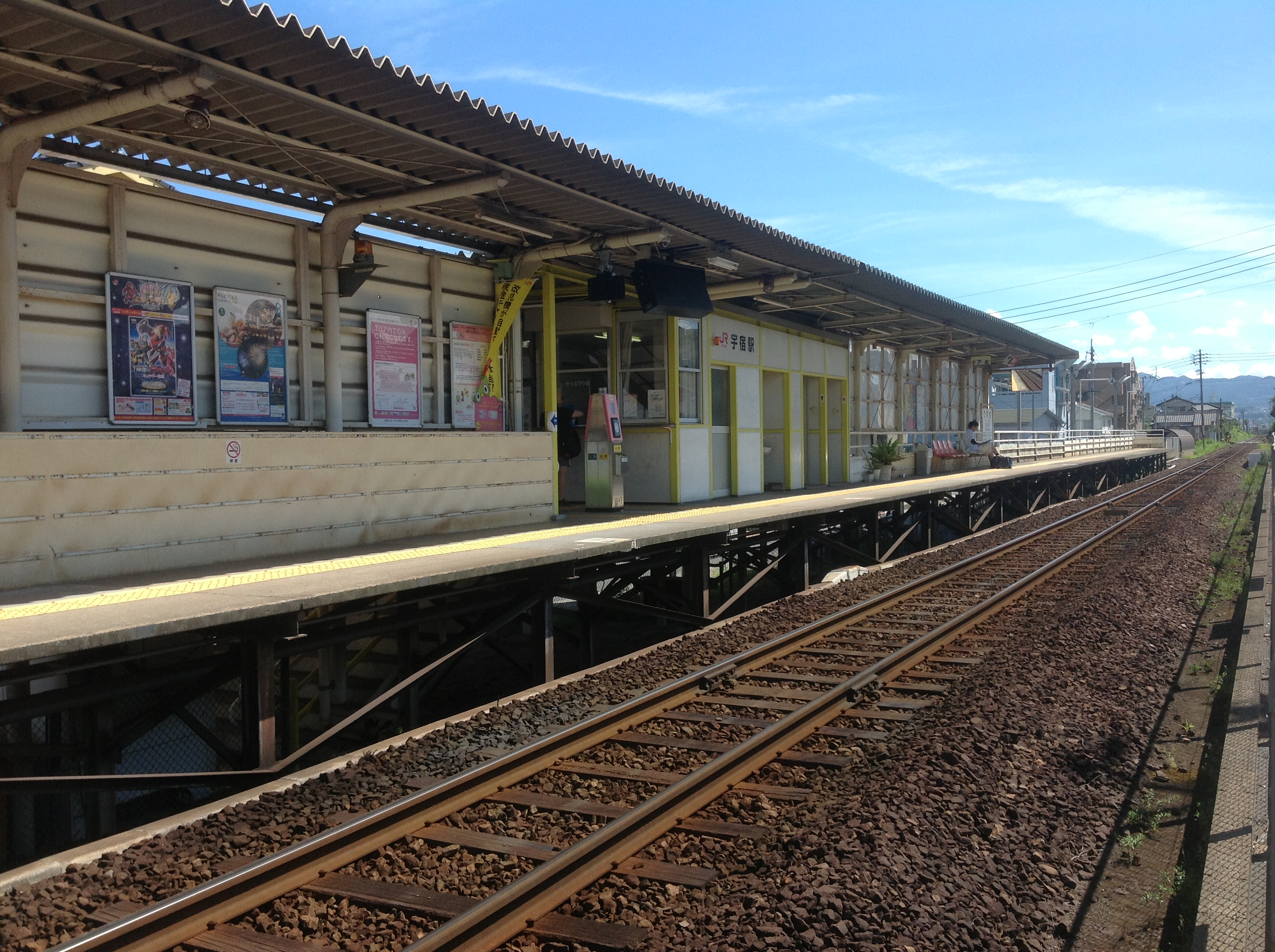
Platform

== History ==
The station was opened on 1 December 1986. With the privatization of Japanese National Railways (JNR), the successor of JGR, on 1 April 1987, the station came under the control of JR Kyushu.

== Passenger statistics ==
In fiscal 2020, the station was used by an average of 1013 passengers daily (boarding passengers only), and it ranked 134th among the busiest stations of JR Kyushu.

== Surrounding area ==
- Kagoshima City Tram Wakita Station
- The Sakuragaokaapartment complex
- Kagoshima University Medical And Dental Hospital

== See also ==
- List of railway stations in Japan
- Usuki Station (Oita)
