= Usuki Castle =

Japanese castle in Usuki, Oita prefecture

Usuki Castle 臼杵城
- Usuki, Ōita Prefecture, Japan
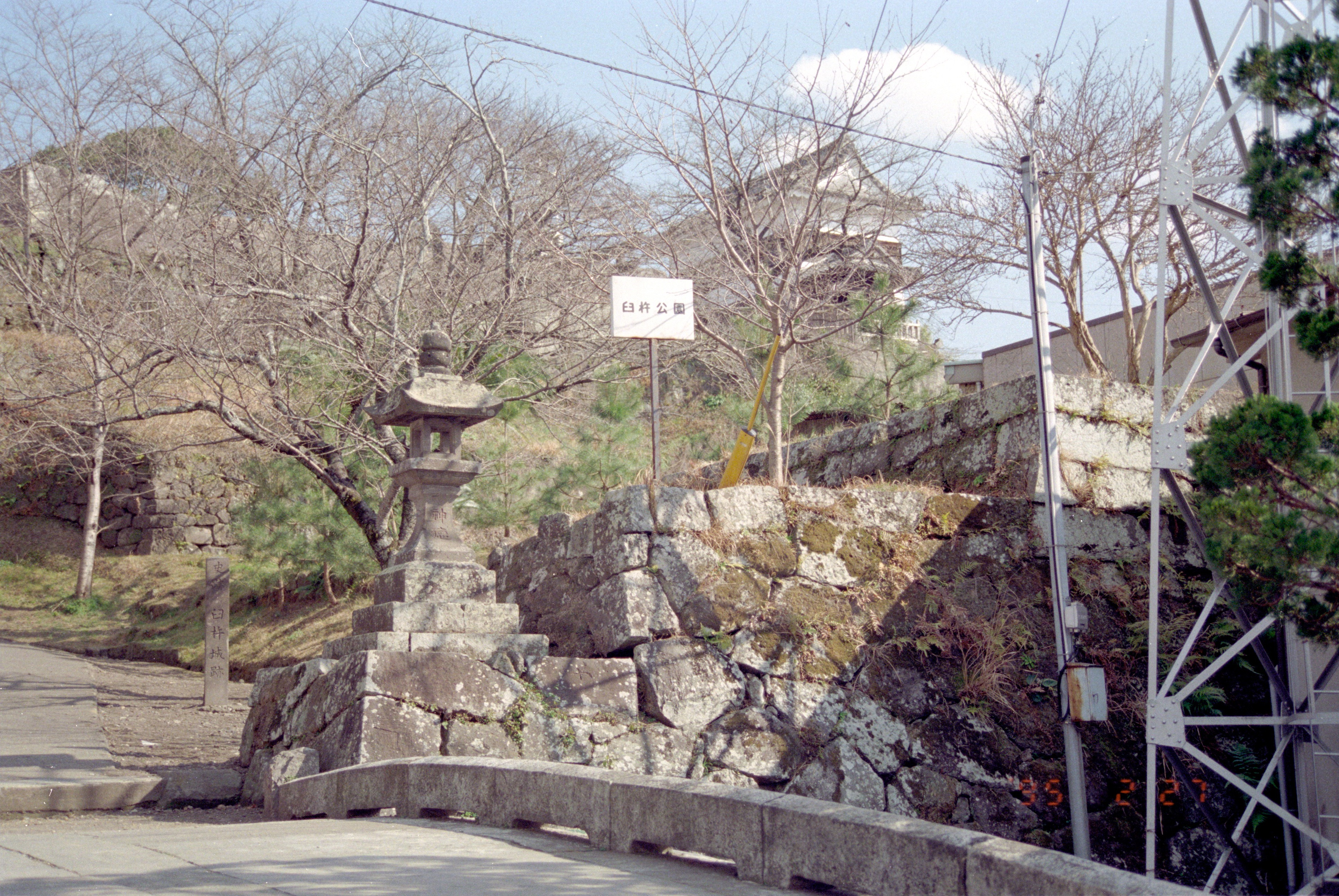
- Usuki Castle

Site information
- Type: Japanese castle

Location
- Coordinates: 33°7′18.59″N 131°48′14.77″E

Site history
- Built: 1562
- Built by: Ōtomo Sōrin

Usuki Castle (臼杵城, Usuki-jō) is a Japanese castle in Usuki, Ōita Prefecture, Japan. Another name of this castle is Nyūjima Castle (丹生島城, Nyūjima-jō).

== History ==
This castle was constructed by Ōtomo Sōrin in 1562 on the island Nyū-jima, in Usuki Bay as his head castle. During the 1560s, Sōrin had the largest territory in Kyūshū. However, after defeat at the Battle of Mimigawa in 1578, the power of Sōrin and the Ōtomo clan rapidly declined. In 1586, this castle fell to Shimazu Yoshihiro, a daimyō of Kagoshima, but was rescued by Toyotomi Hideyoshi.

William Adams, basis for the character in the novel Shōgun by James Clavell, stayed in the castle upon his arrival in Japan.

== Access ==
- Usuki Station on the Nippō Main Line

== Literature ==
- De Lange, William (2021). An Encyclopedia of Japanese Castles. Groningen: Toyo Press. pp. 600 pages. ISBN 978-9492722300.
- Schmorleitz, Morton S. (1974). Castles in Japan. Tokyo: Charles E. Tuttle Co. ISBN 0-8048-1102-4.
