= Kumasaki Station =

Railway station in Usuki, Ōita Prefecture, Japan

Kumasaki Station 熊崎駅
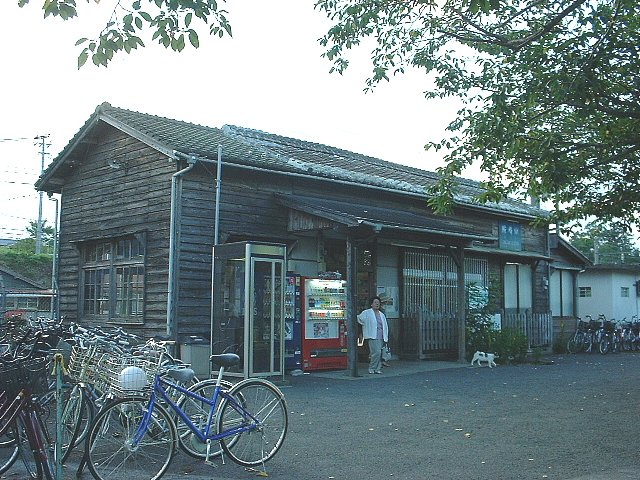
- Kumasaki Station in 2005

General information
- Location: 1983-2 Shioiri, Imura, Usuki-shi, Ōita-ken 875-0083; Japan
- Coordinates: 33°08′10″N 131°47′16″E
- Operator: JR Kyushu
- Line: ■ Nippō Main Line
- Distance: 164.7 km from Kokura
- Platforms: 1 island platform
- Tracks: 2

Construction
- Structure type: At grade
- Accessible: No - footbridge to island platform

Other information
- Status: Unstaffed
- Website: Official website

History
- Opened: 15 August 1920

Passengers
- FY2016: 399 daily
- Rank: 270th (among JR Kyushu stations)

Services
Preceding station	JR Kyushu	Following station
Kami-Usuki towards Kagoshima	Nippō Main Line	Shitanoe towards Kokura
Location
- Location within Oita Prefecture Location within Japan

Kumasaki Station (熊崎駅, Kumasaki-eki) is a passenger railway station located in the city of Usuki, Ōita, Japan. It is operated by JR Kyushu.

== Lines ==
The station is served by the Nippō Main Line and is located 164.7 km from the starting point of the line at Kokura.

== Layout ==
The station consists of an island platform serving two tracks at grade. The station building is a timber structure of traditional Japanese design. It is unstaffed and serves only to house a waiting area and an automatic ticket vending machine. Access to the island platform is by means of a footbridge.

=== Platforms ===
1	■ ■ Nippō Main Line	for Saiki
2	■ ■ Nippō Main Line	for Ōita

== History ==
Japanese Government Railways (JGR) opened the station on 15 August 1920 as an additional station on the existing track of what was then its Hōshū Main Line, subsequently renamed the Nippō Main Line on 15 December 1923. With the privatization of Japanese National Railways (JNR), the successor of JGR, on 1 April 1987, the station came under the control of JR Kyushu.

The station became unstaffed on 14 March 2015.

== Passenger statistics ==
In fiscal 2016, the station was used by an average of 399 passengers daily (boarding passengers only), and it ranked 270th among the busiest stations of JR Kyushu.

== Surrounding area ==
- Usuki Shrine
- Usuki Kofun
- Japan National Route 205

== See also ==
- List of railway stations in Japan
