= Kōrimoto Station (JR Kyushu) =

Railway station in Kagoshima, Kagoshima Prefecture, Japan

Kōrimoto Station 郡元駅
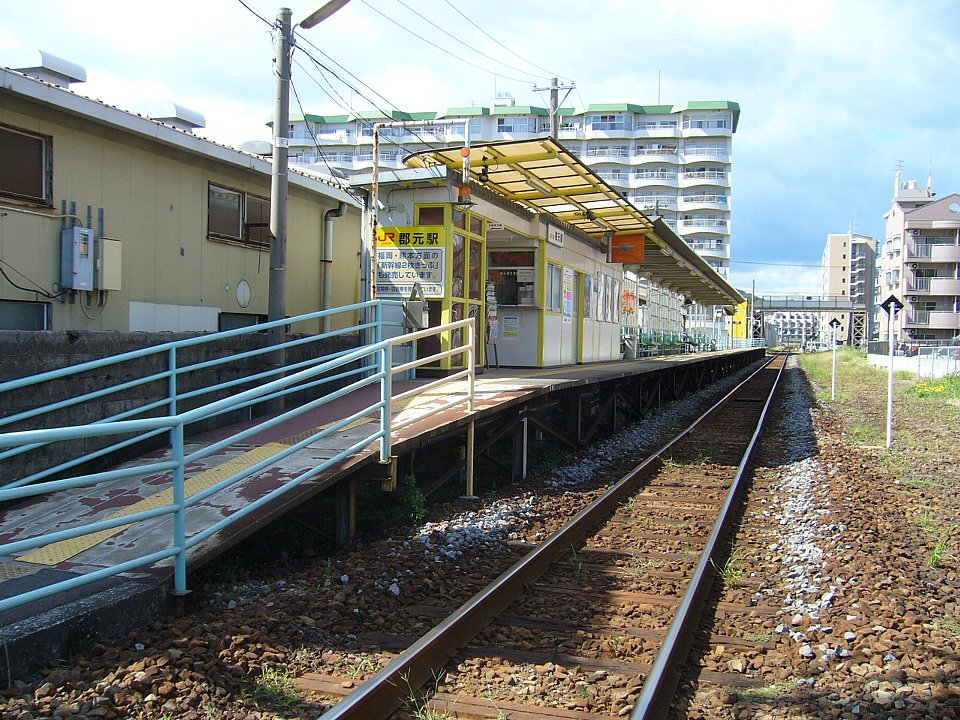
- Kōrimoto Station

General information
- Location: Toso 4-Chome, Kagoshima-shi, Kagoshima-ken 890-0081; Japan
- Coordinates: 31°33′55.58″N 130°32′31.64″E
- Operator: JR Kyushu
- Line: ■ Ibusuki Makurazaki Line
- Distance: 2.2 km from Kagoshima-Chūō
- Platforms: 1 side platform

Other information
- Status: Unstaffed
- Website: Official website

History
- Opened: 1 December 1986

Passengers
- FY2020: 889 daily

Services
| Preceding station | JR Kyushu | Following station |
|---|---|---|
| Kagoshima-Chūō Terminus | Ibusuki Makurazaki Line | Minami-Kagoshima towards Makurazaki |
Location
- Location within Kagoshima Prefecture Location within Japan

Kōrimoto Station (郡元駅, Kōrimoto-eki) is a passenger railway station located in the city of Kagoshima, Kagoshima Prefecture, Japan. It is operated by JR Kyushu.

== Lines ==
The station is served by the Ibusuki Makurazaki Line and is located 2.2 km from the starting point of the line at Kagoshima-Chūō.

== Layout ==
This is an above-ground station with one side platform. The station is unattended.

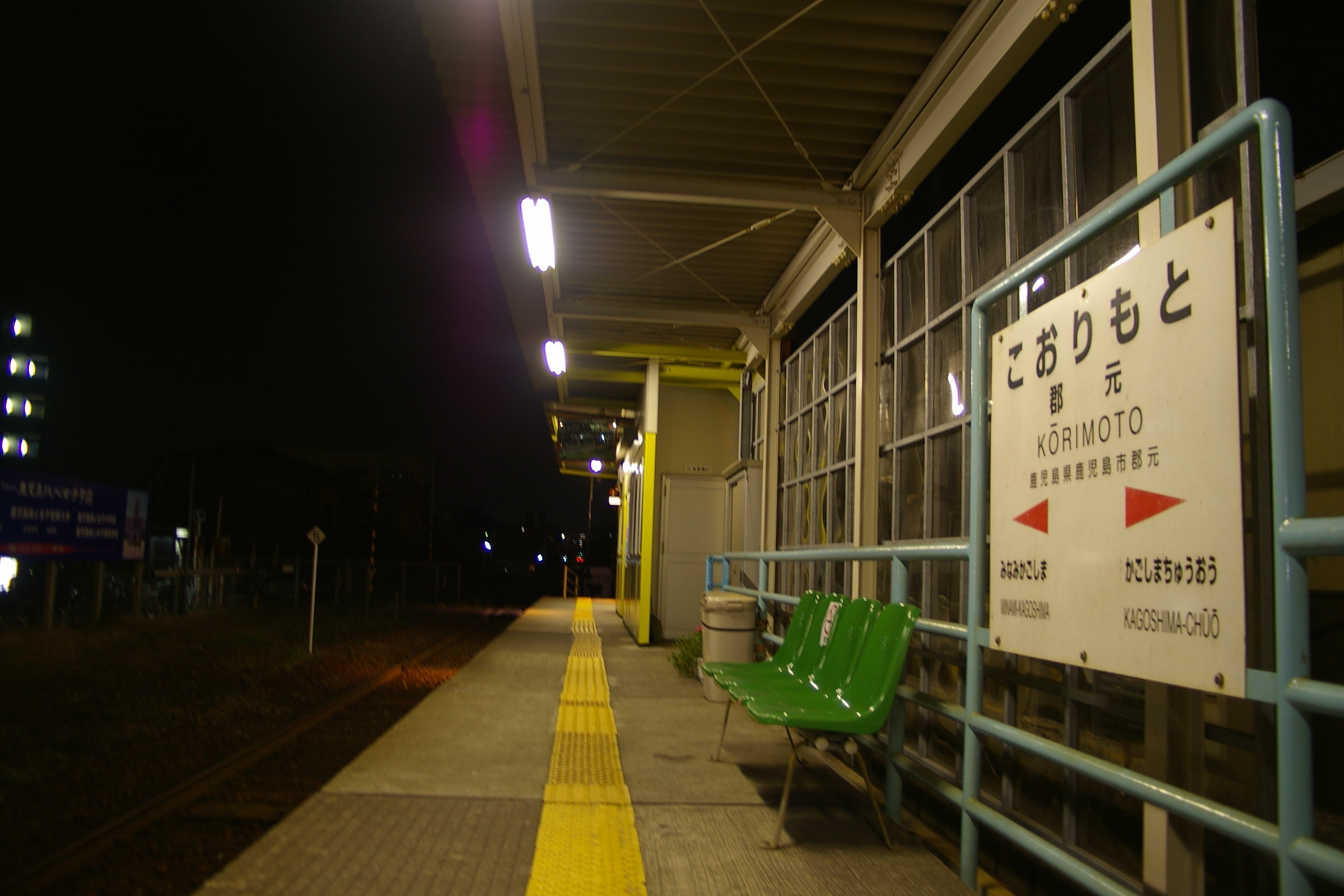
Platform

== History ==
The station was opened on 1 December 1986. With the privatization of Japanese National Railways (JNR), the successor of JGR, on 1 April 1987, the station came under the control of JR Kyushu.

== Passenger statistics ==
In fiscal 2020, the station was used by an average of 889 passengers daily (boarding passengers only), and it ranked 149th among the busiest stations of JR Kyushu.

== Surrounding area ==
- JR Kyushu Kagoshima Rolling Stock Center and Kagoshima Construction Office (Kakako)
- Kagoshima City Hospital (former site of JT Kagoshima Factory)
- Kagoshima City Transportation Bureau (former site of JT Kagoshima Factory)
- Kagoshima University Kōrimoto Campus
- Kagoshima University Elementary School

== See also ==
- List of railway stations in Japan
