= Usuki Station (Ōita) =

Railway station in Usuki, Ōita Prefecture, Japan

Usuki Station 臼杵駅
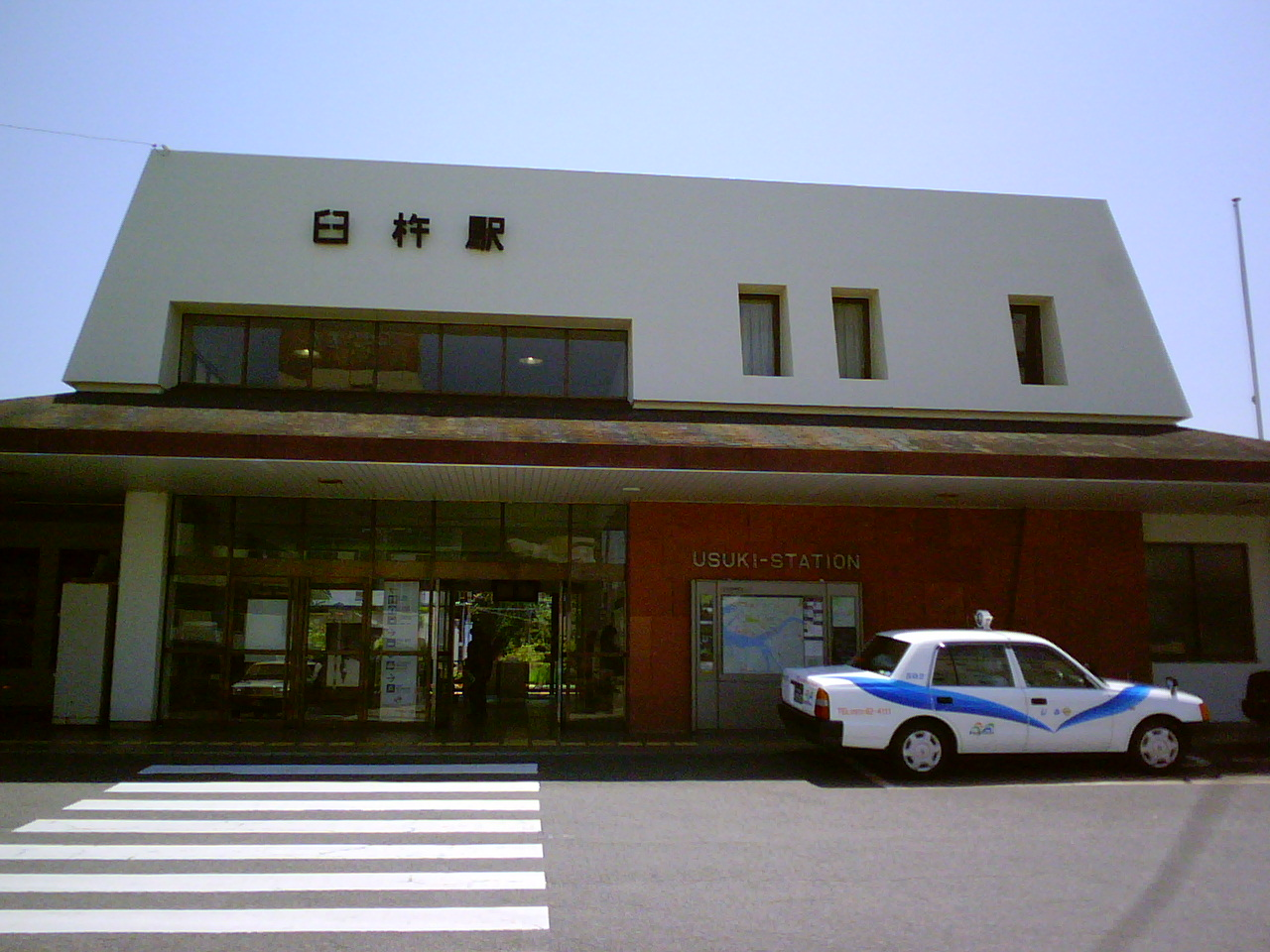
- Usuki Station in 2011

General information
- Location: 2573-2 Kaizoe, Usuki-shi, Ōita-ken 875-0042; Japan
- Coordinates: 33°07′07″N 131°48′28″E
- Operator: JR Kyushu
- Line: ■ Nippō Main Line
- Distance: 169.2 km from Kokura
- Platforms: 1 side + 1 island platform
- Tracks: 3 + 2 sidings

Construction
- Structure type: At grade
- Accessible: No - platforms linked by footbridge

Other information
- Status: Staffed ticket window (Midori no Madoguchi) (outsourced)
- Website: Official website

History
- Opened: 15 August 1915

Passengers
- FY2016: 700 daily
- Rank: 206th (among JR Kyushu stations)

Services
Preceding station	JR Kyushu	Following station
Kami-Usuki towards Kagoshima	Nippō Main Line	Tsukumi towards Kokura
Location
- Location within Oita Prefecture Location within Japan

Usuki Station (臼杵駅, Usuki-eki) is a passenger railway station located in the city of Usuki, Ōita, Japan. It is operated by JR Kyushu.

== Lines ==
The station is served by the Nippō Main Line and is located 169.2 km from the starting point of the line at Kokura.

== Layout ==
The station has a side platform and an island platform serving three tracks at grade. Two sidings run to the south of platform 3. The station building is a modern concrete structure which houses an enclosed waiting room, shop and a staffed ticket window. Access to the island platform is by means of a footbridge.

Management of the passenger facilities at the station has been outsourced to the JR Kyushu Tetsudou Eigyou Co., a wholly owned subsidiary of JR Kyushu specialising in station services. It staffs the ticket booth which is equipped with a Midori no Madoguchi facility.

=== Platforms ===
1	■ ■ Nippō Main Line	for Saiki, Nobeoka and Miyazaki
2, 3	■ ■ Nippō Main Line	for Ōita, Kokura and Hakata

== History ==
The private Kyushu Railway had, by 1909, through acquisition and its own expansion, established a track from Kokura to Yanagigaura. The Kyushu Railway was nationalised on 1 July 1907. Japanese Government Railways (JGR), designated the track as the Hōshū Main Line on 12 October 1909 and expanded it southwards in phases, with Usuki opening as the new southern terminus on 15 August 1915. It became a through-station on 25 October 1916 when the track was extended further south to Saiki. On 15 December 1923, the Hōshū Main Line was renamed the Nippō Main Line. With the privatization of Japanese National Railways (JNR), the successor of JGR, on 1 April 1987, the station came under the control of JR Kyushu.

On 17 September 2017, Typhoon Talim (Typhoon 18) damaged the Nippō Main Line at several locations. Services between Usuki and Saiki were suspended. Rail services were restored on 18 December 2017. However JR Kyushu reported that recovery work was difficult at the site of the Tokūra Signal Box between Usuki and Tsukumi which had been covered by a landslide. Of the two tracks there, only one would be restored. According to JR Kyushu, having only a single track there (effectively closing down the signal box) would not have a large impact on its timetables and believed that it amounted to a full restoration of service.

== Passenger statistics ==
In fiscal 2016, the station was used by an average of 700 passengers daily (boarding passengers only), and it ranked 206th among the busiest stations of JR Kyushu.

== Surrounding area ==
The station is near the center of the city, convenient to several sites. Among these are

- Usuki Ferry Terminal
- Administrative offices including the Usuki City Hall, police and fire stations, court, tax office
- Usuki Park, location of the former Usuki Castle
- Ōita Prefectural Usuki High School
- Usuki Shipyard
- The Nogami Yaeko Memorial Museum

== See also ==
- Usuki Station (Kagoshima)
- List of railway stations in Japan
