= Japan National Route 217 =

Road in Oita prefecture, Japan

National Route 217
- 国道217号
- Japan National Route 217 highlighted in red

Route information
- Length: 92.3 km (57.4 mi)
- Existed: 18 May 1953–present

Major junctions
- North end: National Route 10 in Ōita
- South end: National Route 10 in Saiki

Location
- Country: Japan

Highway system
- National highways of Japan; Expressways of Japan
| ← National Route 213 | → National Route 218 |

National Route 217 (国道217号, Kokudō Nihyaku-jūnana-gō) is a national highway of Japan connecting Ōita and Saiki in Japan, with a total length of 92.3 km (57.35 mi).
