= Tatsutaguchi Station =

Railway station in Kumamoto, Japan

Tatsutaguchi Station 竜田口駅
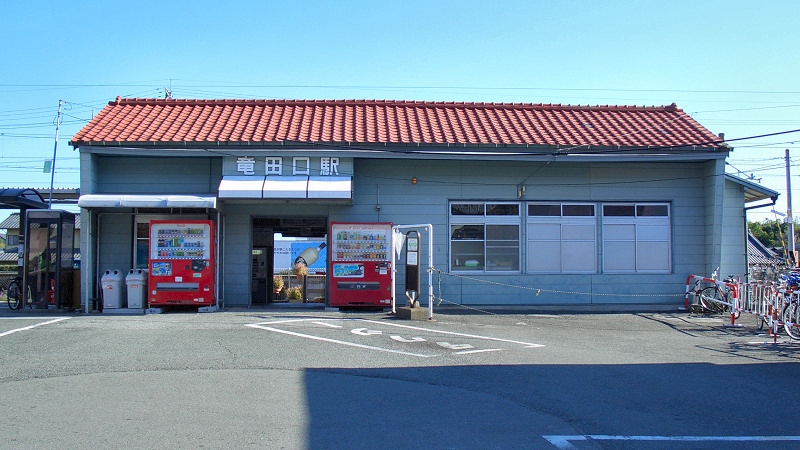
- Tatsutaguchi Station in 2007

General information
- Location: 7 Chome Kurokami, Kita-ku, Kumamoto-shi, Kumamoto-ken, 860-0862; Japan
- Coordinates: 32°49′13″N 130°44′48″E
- Operator: JR Kyushu
- Line: ■ Hōhi Main Line
- Distance: 8.9 km from Kumamoto
- Platforms: 1 island platform
- Tracks: 2

Construction
- Structure type: At grade

Other information
- Status: Staffed ticket window (outsourced)
- Website: Official website

History
- Opened: 21 June 1914; 112 years ago

Passengers
- FY2020: 557 daily
- Rank: 203rd (among JR Kyushu stations)

Services
Preceding station	JR Kyushu	Following station
Tōkai-Gakuen-mae towards Kumamoto	Hōhi Main Line	Musashizuka towards Ōita
Location
- Location within Kumamoto Prefecture Location within Japan

Tatsutaguchi Station (竜田口駅, Tatsutaguchi-eki) is a passenger railway station located in the Kita-ku ward of the city of Kumamoto, Kumamoto Prefecture, Japan. It is operated by JR Kyushu. It is the nearest train station from Kumamoto University International House, as well as the nearest JR station from Kumamoto university main campus (Kurokami campus).

== Lines ==
The station is served by the Hōhi Main Line and is located 8.9 km from the starting point of the line at Kumamoto.

== Layout ==
The station consists of an island platform serving two tracks at grade. The station building is a Japanese style wooden structure with a red tile roof. It houses a waiting area and a staffed ticket window. Access to the island platform is by means of a level crossing. To the south of the station, beyond platform 2, is a disused siding.

Management of the station has been outsourced to the JR Kyushu Tetsudou Eigyou Co., a wholly owned subsidiary of JR Kyushu specialising in station services. It staffs the ticket booth which is equipped with a POS machine but does not have a Midori no Madoguchi facility.

=== Platforms ===
1	■ Hōhi Main Line	for Higo-Ōzu and Aso
2	■ Hōhi Main Line	for Suizenji and Kumamoto

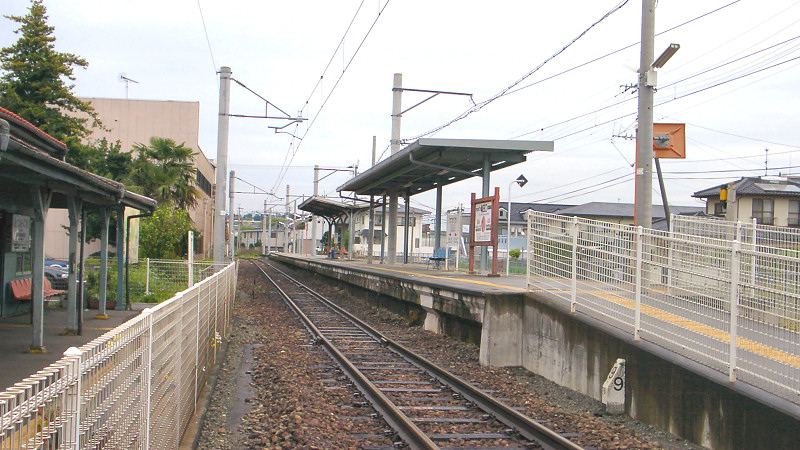
A view of the platforms and tracks

== History ==
On 21 June 1914, Japanese Government Railways (JGR) opened the Miyagi Light Rail Line (宮地軽便線) (later the Miyagi Line) from Kumamoto eastwards to Higo-Ōzu. On the same day, this station was opened as one of several intermediate stations along the track. By 1928, the track had been extended eastward and had linked up with the Inukai Line (犬飼線) which had been built westward from Ōita. On 2 December 1928, the entire track from Kumamoto to Ōita was designated as the Hōhi Main Line. With the privatization of Japanese National Railways (JNR), the successor of JGR, on 1 April 1987, the station came under the control of JR Kyushu.

== Passenger statistics ==
In fiscal 2020, the station was used by an average of 557 passengers daily (boarding passengers only), and it ranked 203rd among the busiest stations of JR Kyushu.

== Surrounding area ==
- Kumamoto University
- Kumamoto International Folk Crafts Museum

== See also ==
- List of railway stations in Japan
