= Sanrigi Station =

Railway station in Kikuyō, Kumamoto Prefecture, Japan

Sanrigi Station 三里木駅
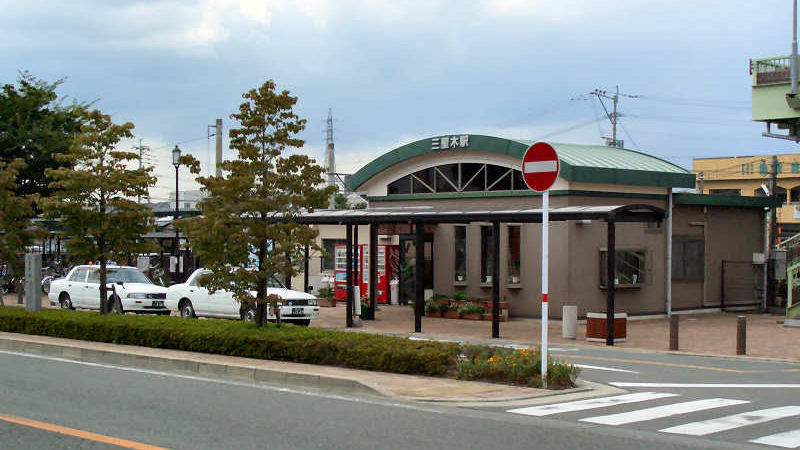
- Sanrigi Station in 2006

General information
- Location: 2345-2 Tsukure, Kikuyō-machi, Kikuchi-gun, Kumamoto-ken, 869-1101; Japan
- Coordinates: 32°51′43″N 130°47′49″E
- Operator: JR Kyushu
- Line: ■ Hōhi Main Line
- Distance: 15.8 km from Kumamoto
- Platforms: 1 island platform
- Tracks: 2 + 1 siding

Construction
- Structure type: At grade
- Cycle facilities: Bike shed

Other information
- Status: Staffed ticket window (outsourced)
- Website: Official website

History
- Opened: 21 June 1914; 112 years ago

Passengers
- FY2020: 419 daily
- Rank: 235th (among JR Kyushu stations)

Services
Preceding station	JR Kyushu	Following station
Hikarinomori towards Kumamoto	Hōhi Main Line	Haramizu towards Ōita
Location
- Location within Kumamoto Prefecture Location within Japan

Sanrigi Station (三里木駅, Sanrigi-eki) is a passenger railway station located in the town of Kikuyō, Kumamoto, Japan. It Is operated by JR Kyushu.

== Lines ==
The station is served by the Hōhi Main Line and is located 15.8 km from the starting point of the line at Kumamoto.

== Layout ==
The station consists of an island platform serving two tracks at grade with a siding. The station building is a modern concrete structure which houses a waiting area, a staffed ticket window as well as the Kikuyō town information centre. Access to the island platform is by means of a level crossing.

Management of the station has been outsourced to the JR Kyushu Tetsudou Eigyou Co., a wholly owned subsidiary of JR Kyushu specialising in station services. It staffs the ticket window which is equipped with a POS machine but does not have a Midori no Madoguchi facility.

=== Platforms ===
1	■ ■ Hōhi Main Line	for Kumamoto
2	■ ■ Hōhi Main Line	for Higo-Ōzu and Aso

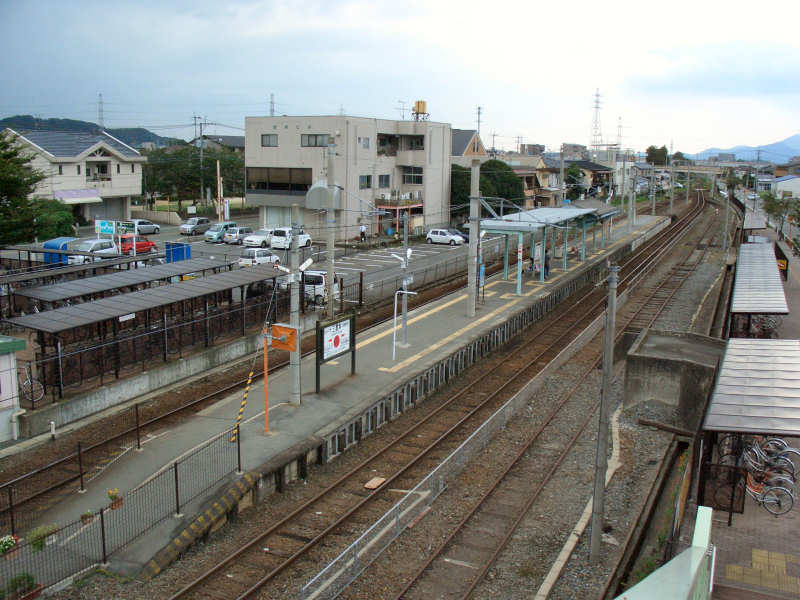
A view of the platforms and tracks. The siding can be seen to the right.

== History ==
On 21 June 1914, Japanese Government Railways (JGR) opened the Miyagi Light Rail Line (宮地軽便線) (later the Miyagi Line) from Kumamoto eastwards to Higo-Ōzu. On the same day, Sanrigi station was opened as one of several intermediate stations along the track. By 1928, the track had been extended eastward and had linked up with the Inukai Line (犬飼線) which had been built westward from Ōita. On 2 December 1928, the entire track from Kumamoto to Ōita was designated as the Hōhi Main Line. With the privatization of Japanese National Railways (JNR), the successor of JGR, on 1 April 1987, the station came under the control of JR Kyushu.

== Passenger statistics ==
In fiscal 2020, the station was used by an average of 419 passengers daily (boarding passengers only), and it ranked 235th among the busiest stations of JR Kyushu.

== Surrounding area ==
- Kikuyo Town Kikuyo Nishi Elementary School

== See also ==
- List of railway stations in Japan
