= Minami-Kumamoto Station =

Railway station in Kumamoto, Japan

Minami-Kumamoto Station 南熊本駅
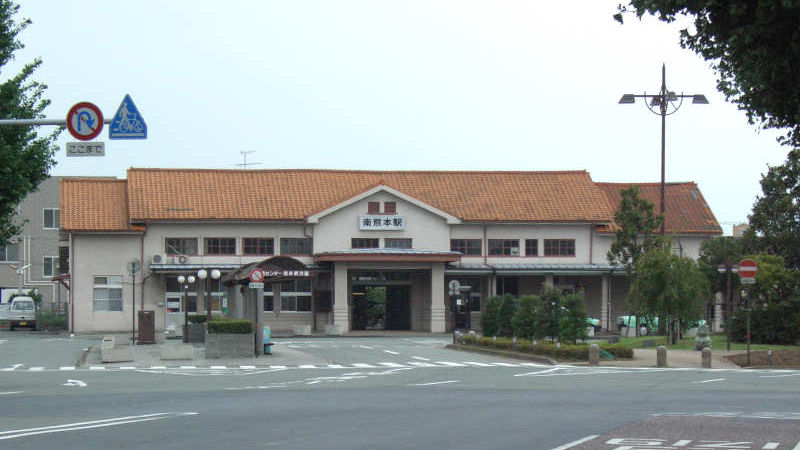
- Minami-Kumamoto in 2006

General information
- Location: 3-chōme-14 Minamikumamoto, Chuo-ku, Kumamoto-shi, Kumamoto-ken 860-0812; Japan
- Coordinates: 32°47′06″N 130°42′42″E
- Operator: JR Kyushu
- Line: ■ Hōhi Main Line
- Distance: 3.6 km from Kumamoto
- Platforms: 2 side platforms
- Tracks: 2

Construction
- Structure type: At grade

Other information
- Status: Staffed ticket window (outsourced)
- Website: Official website

History
- Opened: 21 June 1914; 112 years ago
- Former names: Harutake (until 1 May 1940)

Passengers
- FY2020: 822 daily
- Rank: 158th (among JR Kyushu stations)

Services
Preceding station	JR Kyushu	Following station
Heisei towards Kumamoto	Hōhi Main Line	Shin-Suizenji towards Ōita
Location
- Location within Kumamoto Prefecture Location within Japan

Minami-Kumamoto Station (南熊本駅, Minami-Kumamoto-eki) is a passenger railway station located in the Chūō-ku ward of the city of Kumamoto, Kumamoto Prefecture, Japan. It is operated by JR Kyushu.

== Lines ==
The station is served by the Hōhi Main Line and is located 3.6 km from the starting point of the line at Kumamoto.

== Layout ==
The station consists of two side platforms serving two tracks at grade. The station building is a wooden structure of western design and houses a waiting area and a staffed ticket window. Access to the opposite side platform is by means of a footbridge.

Management of the station has been outsourced to the JR Kyushu Tetsudou Eigyou Co., a wholly owned subsidiary of JR Kyushu specialising in station services. It staffs the ticket booth which is equipped with a POS machine but does not have a Midori no Madoguchi facility.

=== Platforms ===
1	■ Hōhi Main Line	for Higo-Ōzu and Aso
2	■ Hōhi Main Line	for Kumamoto

== History ==
On 21 June 1914, Japanese Government Railways (JGR) opened the Miyagi Light Rail Line (宮地軽便線) (later the Miyagi Line) from Kumamoto eastwards to Higo-Ōzu. On the same day, this station was opened with the name Harutake Station (春竹駅) as one of several intermediate stations along the track. By 1928, the track had been extended eastward and had linked up with the Inukai Line (犬飼線) which had been built westward from Ōita. On 2 December 1928, the entire track from Kumamoto to Ōita was designated as the Hōhi Main Line. On 1 May 1940, the station was renamed Minami-Kumamoto. With the privatization of Japanese National Railways (JNR), the successor of JGR, on 1 April 1987, the station came under the control of JR Kyushu.

== Passenger statistics ==
In fiscal 2020, the station was used by an average of 822 passengers daily (boarding passengers only), and it ranked 158tht among the busiest stations of JR Kyushu.

== Surrounding area ==
- Kumamoto City Harutake Elementary School
- Minami-Kumamoto Hospital
- Kumamoto University Hospital

== See also ==
- List of railway stations in Japan
