= Hikarinomori Station =

Railway station in Kumamoto, Japan

Hikarinomori Station 光の森駅
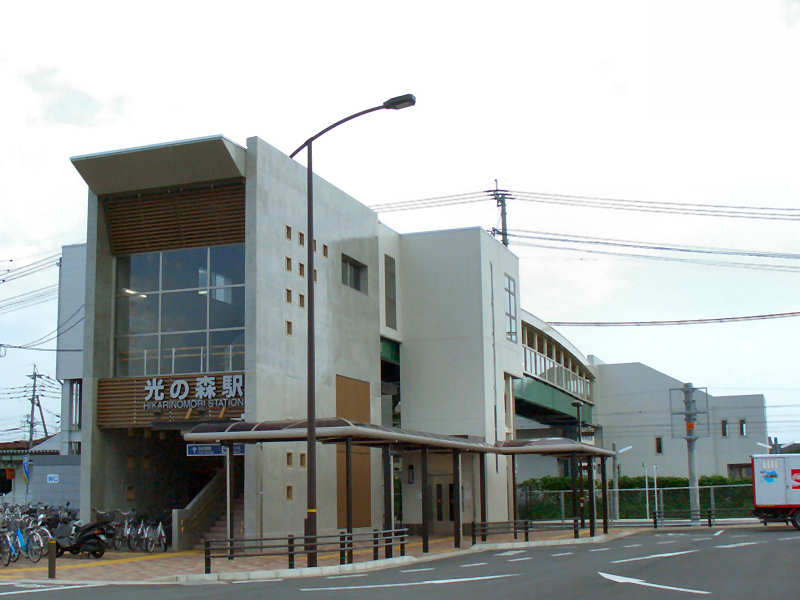
- North entrance of Hikarinomori Station in 2006

General information
- Location: 4-chōme-18 Tatsudamachi Yuge, Kita-ku, Kumamoto-shi, Kumamoto-ken, 861-8002; Japan
- Coordinates: 32°51′29″N 130°47′12″E
- Operator: JR Kyushu
- Line: ■ Hōhi Main Line
- Distance: 14.8 km from Kumamoto
- Platforms: 1 island platform
- Tracks: 2

Construction
- Structure type: At grade
- Cycle facilities: Designated parking area for bikes

Other information
- Status: Staffed ticket window (Midori no Madoguchi)(outsourced)
- Website: Official website

History
- Opened: 18 March 2006; 20 years ago

Passengers
- FY2020: 2018 daily
- Rank: 71st (among JR Kyushu stations)

Services
Preceding station	JR Kyushu	Following station
Musashizuka towards Kumamoto	Hōhi Main Line	Sanrigi towards Ōita
Location
- Location within Kumamoto Prefecture Location within Japan

Hikarinomori Station (光の森駅, Hikari-no-mori-eki) is a passenger railway station located in the Kita-ku ward of the city of Kumamoto, Kumamoto Prefecture, Japan. It is operated by JR Kyushu.

== Lines ==
The station is served by the Hōhi Main Line and is located 133.2 bsp;km from the starting point of the line at Oita.

== Layout ==
The station consists of an island platform serving two tracks at grade. The station building is a modern concrete hashigami-style elevated structure where the station facilities are located on a bridge which spans the tracks and which provides entrances to the station and a free passage to access roads on both sides of the tracks. The second level of the bridge houses a waiting area and a staffed ticket window. Elevators provide access from the station entrances to the second level, and from the second level to the island platform. The island platform has an enclosed, air-conditioned, shelter for waiting passengers.

Management of the station has been outsourced to the JR Kyushu Tetsudou Eigyou Co., a wholly owned subsidiary of JR Kyushu specialising in station services. It staffs the ticket window which is equipped with a Midori no Madoguchi facility.

=== Platforms ===
1	■ Hōhi Main Line	for Suizenji and Kumamoto
2	■ Hōhi Main Line	for Higo-Ōzu and Aso

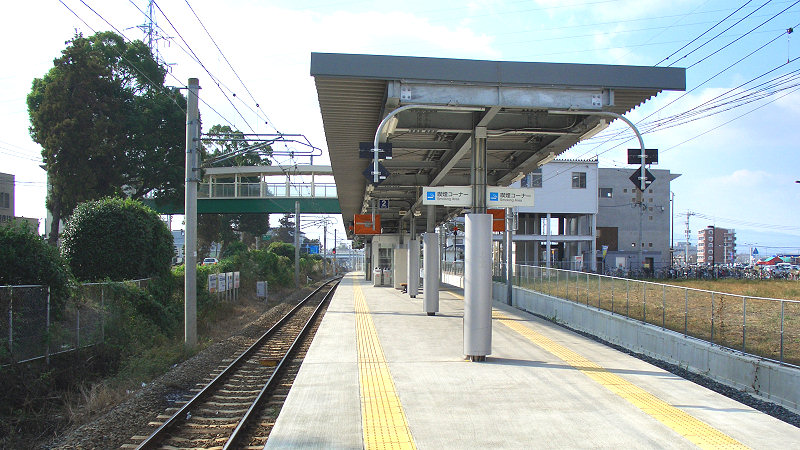
A view of the platforms and tracks. Note the station on the bridge spanning the tracks. There are entrances to the left and right.

== History ==
JR Kyushu opened the station on 18 March 2006 as an additional station on the existing track of the Hōhi Main Line.

== Passenger statistics ==
In fiscal 2020, the station was used by an average of 2018 passengers daily (boarding passengers only), and it ranked 71st among the busiest stations of JR Kyushu.

== Surrounding area ==
- Kumamoto City Yuge Elementary School
- Kikuyo Town Kikuyo Nishi Elementary Scho

== See also ==
- List of railway stations in Japan
