= Heisei Station =

Railway station in Kumamoto, Japan

Heisei Station 平成駅
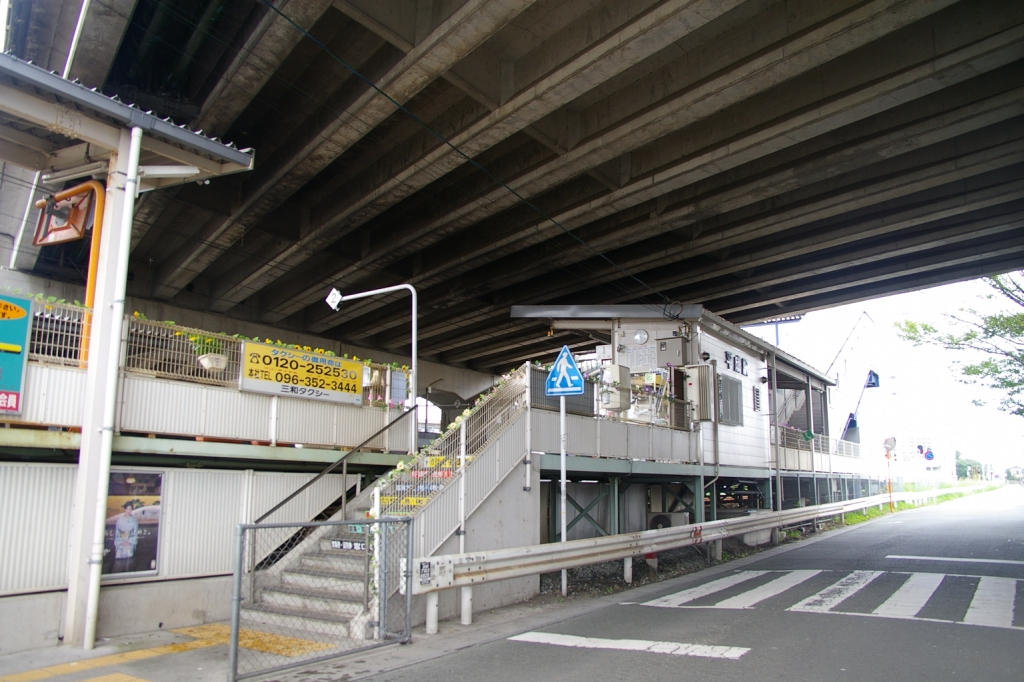
- Heisei Station in 2006

General information
- Location: 2-chōme-1 Heisei, Chuo-ku, Kumamoto-shi, Kumamoto-ken 860-0833; Japan
- Coordinates: 32°46′54″N 130°42′14″E
- Operator: JR Kyushu
- Line: ■ Hōhi Main Line
- Distance: 2.7 km from Kumamoto
- Platforms: 2 side platforms
- Tracks: 2

Construction
- Structure type: At grade
- Accessible: No - steps to platform, footbridge

Other information
- Status: Staffed ticket window (outsourced)
- Website: Official website

History
- Opened: 15 July 1992; 34 years ago

Passengers
- FY2020: 905 daily
- Rank: 146th (among JR Kyushu stations)

Services
Preceding station	JR Kyushu	Following station
Kumamoto Terminus	Hōhi Main Line	Minami-Kumamoto towards Ōita
Location
- Location within Kumamoto Prefecture Location within Japan

Heisei Station (平成駅, Heisei-eki) is a passenger railway station located in the Chūō-ku ward of the city of Kumamoto, Kumamoto Prefecture, Japan. It is operated by JR Kyushu.

== Lines ==
The station is served by the Hōhi Main Line and is located 2.7 km from the starting point of the line at Kumamoto.

== Layout ==
The station consists of two side platforms serving two tracks at grade under a road overpass. There is no station building, but both platforms have shelters. A staffed ticket booth is located on one of the platforms. Access to the other side platform is by means of a footbridge.

Management of the station has been outsourced to the JR Kyushu Tetsudou Eigyou Co., a wholly owned subsidiary of JR Kyushu specialising in station services. It staffs the ticket booth which is equipped with a POS machine but does not have a Midori no Madoguchi facility.

=== Platforms ===
1	■ Hōhi Main Line	for Higo-Ōzu and Aso
2	■ Hōhi Main Line	for Kumamoto

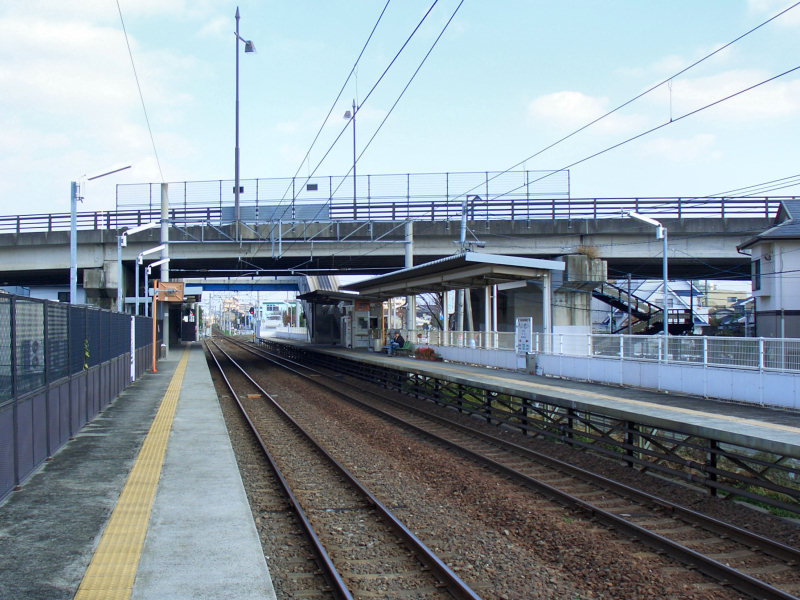
A view of the station platforms and tracks.

== History ==
JR Kyushu opened the station on 15 July 1992 as an addition station on the existing track of the Hōhi Main Line.

== Passenger statistics ==
In fiscal 2020, the station was used by an average of 905 passengers daily (boarding passengers only), and it ranked 146th among the busiest stations of JR Kyushu.

== Surrounding area ==
- Bessho Kotohira Shrine
- Heisei Central Park
- Kumamoto City Ebara Junior High School

== See also ==
- List of railway stations in Japan
