= Musashizuka Station =

Railway station in Kumamoto, Japan

Musashizuka Station 武蔵塚駅
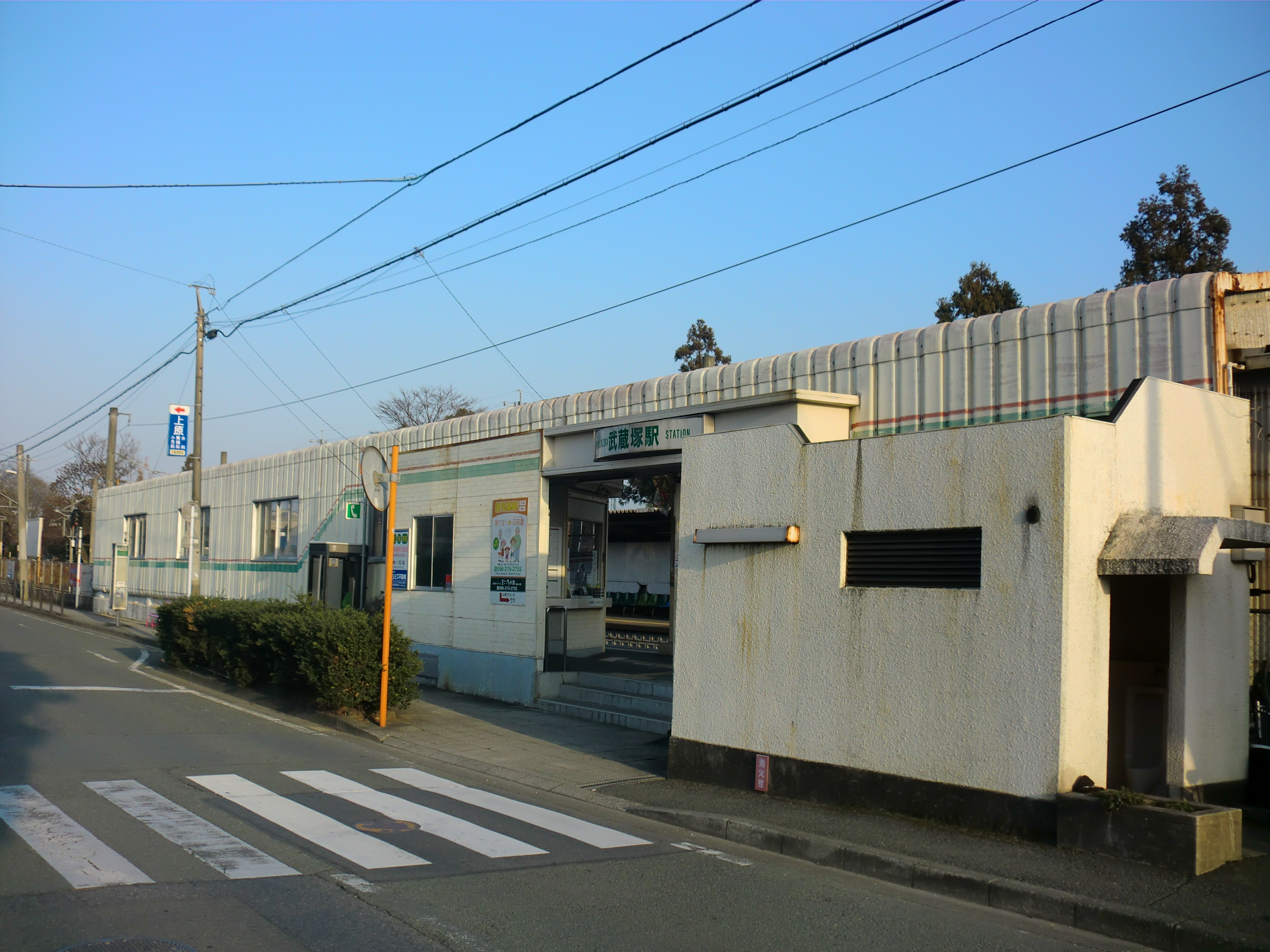
- Musashizuka Station in 2014

General information
- Location: Yuge, Tatsuta-cho, Kita-ku, Kumamoto-shi, Kumamoto-ken 861-8002; Japan
- Coordinates: 32°51′00″N 130°46′12″E
- Operator: JR Kyushu
- Line: ■ Hōhi Main Line
- Distance: 12.9 km from Kumamoto
- Platforms: 2 side platforms
- Tracks: 2

Construction
- Structure type: At grade
- Cycle facilities: Bike shed

Other information
- Status: Staffed ticket window (Midori no Madoguchi)(outsourced)
- Website: Official website

History
- Opened: 1 October 1981; 44 years ago

Passengers
- FY2020: 1805 daily
- Rank: 81st (among JR Kyushu stations)

Services
Preceding station	JR Kyushu	Following station
Tatsutaguchi towards Kumamoto	Hōhi Main Line	Hikarinomori towards Ōita
Location
- Location within Kumamoto Prefecture Location within Japan

Musashizuka Station (武蔵塚駅, Musashizuka-eki) is a passenger railway station located in the Kita-ku ward of the city of Kumamoto, Kumamoto Prefecture, Japan. It is operated by JR Kyushu.

== Lines ==
The station is served by the Hōhi Main Line and is located 12.9 km from the starting point of the line at Kumamoto.

== Layout ==
The station consists of two side platforms serving two tracks at grade. The station building is a modern functional concrete structure which houses a waiting area and a staffed ticket window. Access to the opposite platform is by means of a level crossing. A bike shed is provided outside the station building.

Management of the station has been outsourced to the JR Kyushu Tetsudou Eigyou Co., a wholly owned subsidiary of JR Kyushu specialising in station services. It staffs the ticket window which is equipped with a Midori no Madoguchi facility.

=== Platforms ===
1	■ Hōhi Main Line	for Suizenji and Kumamoto
2	■ Hōhi Main Line	for Higo-Ōzu and Aso

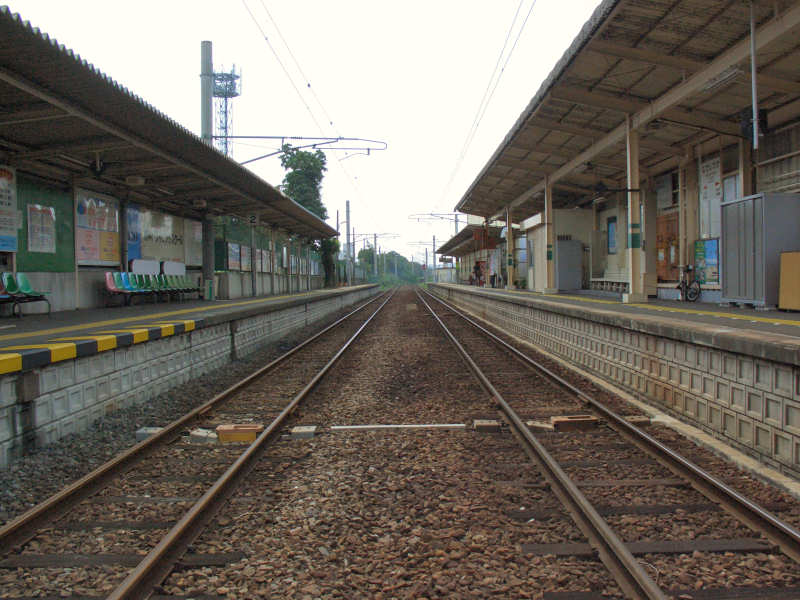
A view of the platforms and tracks from level crossing

== History ==
Japanese National Railways (JNR) opened the station on 1 October 1981 as an additional station on the existing track of the Hōhi Main Line. With the privatization of JNR on 1 April 1987, the station came under the control of JR Kyushu.

== Passenger statistics ==
In fiscal 2016, the station was used by an average of 1805 passengers daily (boarding passengers only), and it ranked 81st among the busiest stations of JR Kyushu.

== Surrounding area ==
- Musashigaoka Housing Complex
- Kumamoto City Musashi Elementary School
- Kumamoto City Kusunoki Elementary School

== See also ==
- List of railway stations in Japan
