= Haramizu Station =

Railway station in Kikuyō, Kumamoto Prefecture, Japan

Haramizu Station 原水駅
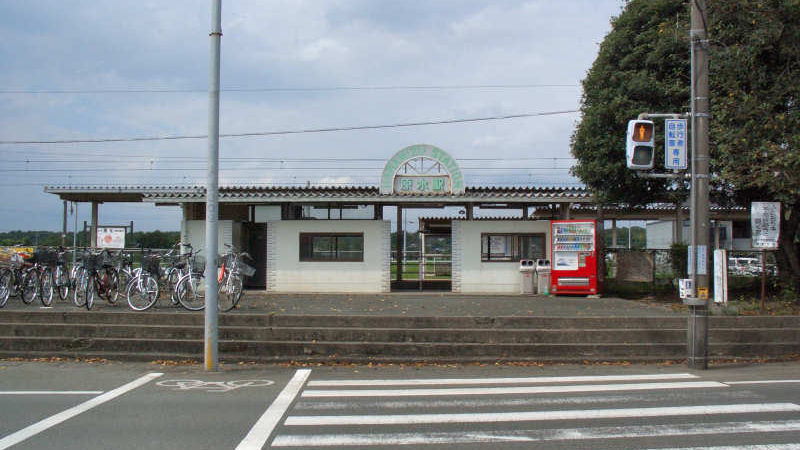
- Haramizu Station in 2006

General information
- Location: Haramizu, Kikuyō-machi, Kikuchi-gun, Kumamoto-ken 869-1102; Japan
- Coordinates: 32°52′14″N 130°49′44″E
- Operator: JR Kyushu
- Line: ■ Hōhi Main Line
- Distance: 18.9 km from Kumamoto
- Platforms: 2 side platforms
- Tracks: 2

Construction
- Structure type: At grade

Other information
- Status: Unstaffed
- Website: Official website

History
- Opened: 25 July 1920; 106 years ago

Passengers
- FY2020: 780 daily
- Rank: 167th (among JR Kyushu stations)

Services
Preceding station	JR Kyushu	Following station
Sanrigi towards Kumamoto	Hōhi Main Line	Higo-Ōzu towards Ōita
Location
- Location within Kumamoto Prefecture Location within Japan

Haramizu Station (原水駅, Haramizu-eki) is a passenger railway station located in the town of Kikuyō, Kumamoto, Japan. It Is operated by JR Kyushu.

== Lines ==
The station is served by the Hōhi Main Line and is located 18.9 km from the starting point of the line at Kumamoto.

== Layout ==
The station, which is unstaffed, consists of two side platforms serving two tracks at grade. The station building is a simple steel frame structure which serves only to house a waiting room and an automatic ticket vending machine. Access to the opposite side platform is by means of a level crossing.

=== Platforms ===
1	■ ■ Hōhi Main Line	for Kumamoto
2	■ ■ Hōhi Main Line	for Higo-Ōzu and Aso

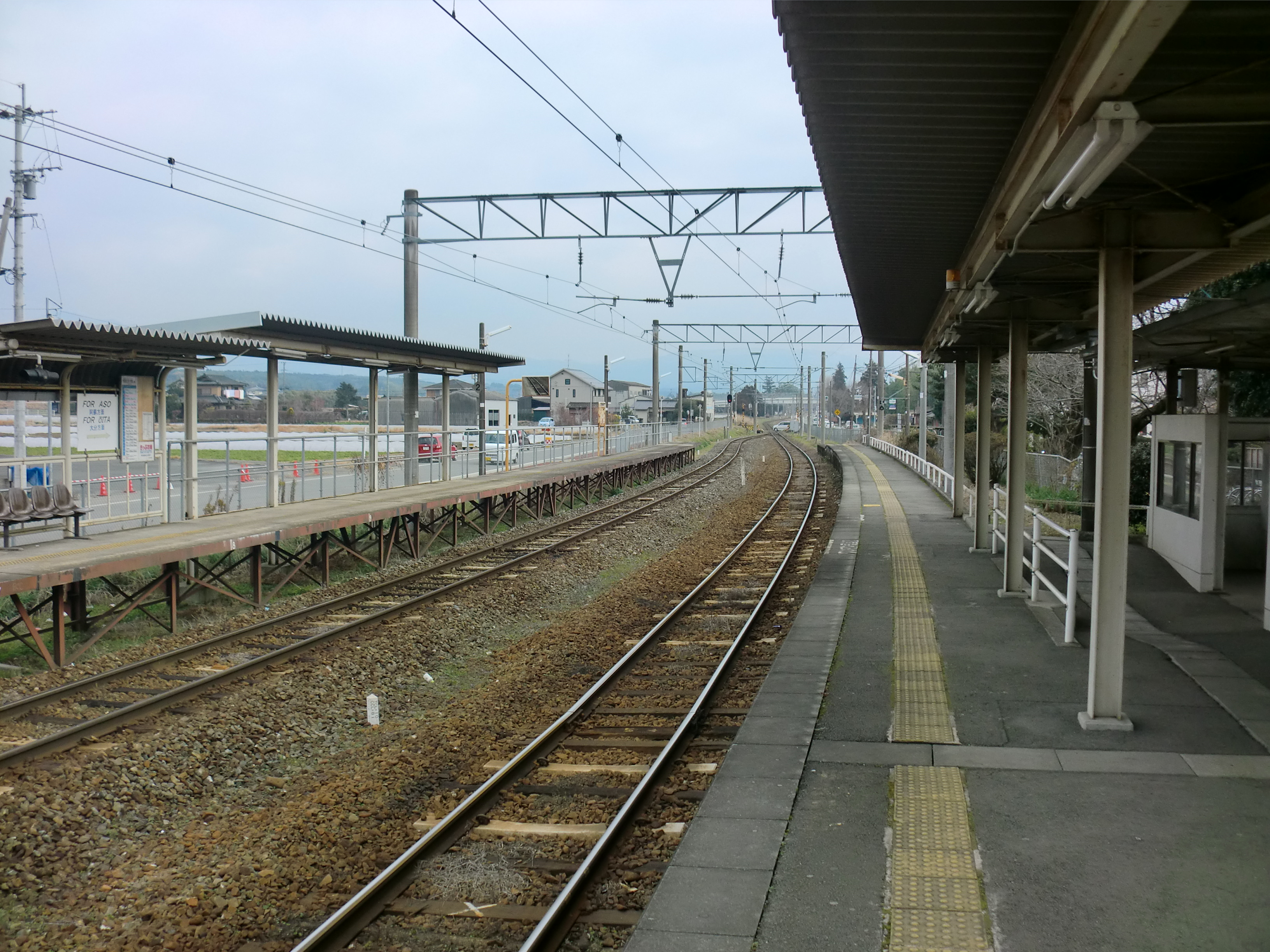
A view of the platforms and tracks.

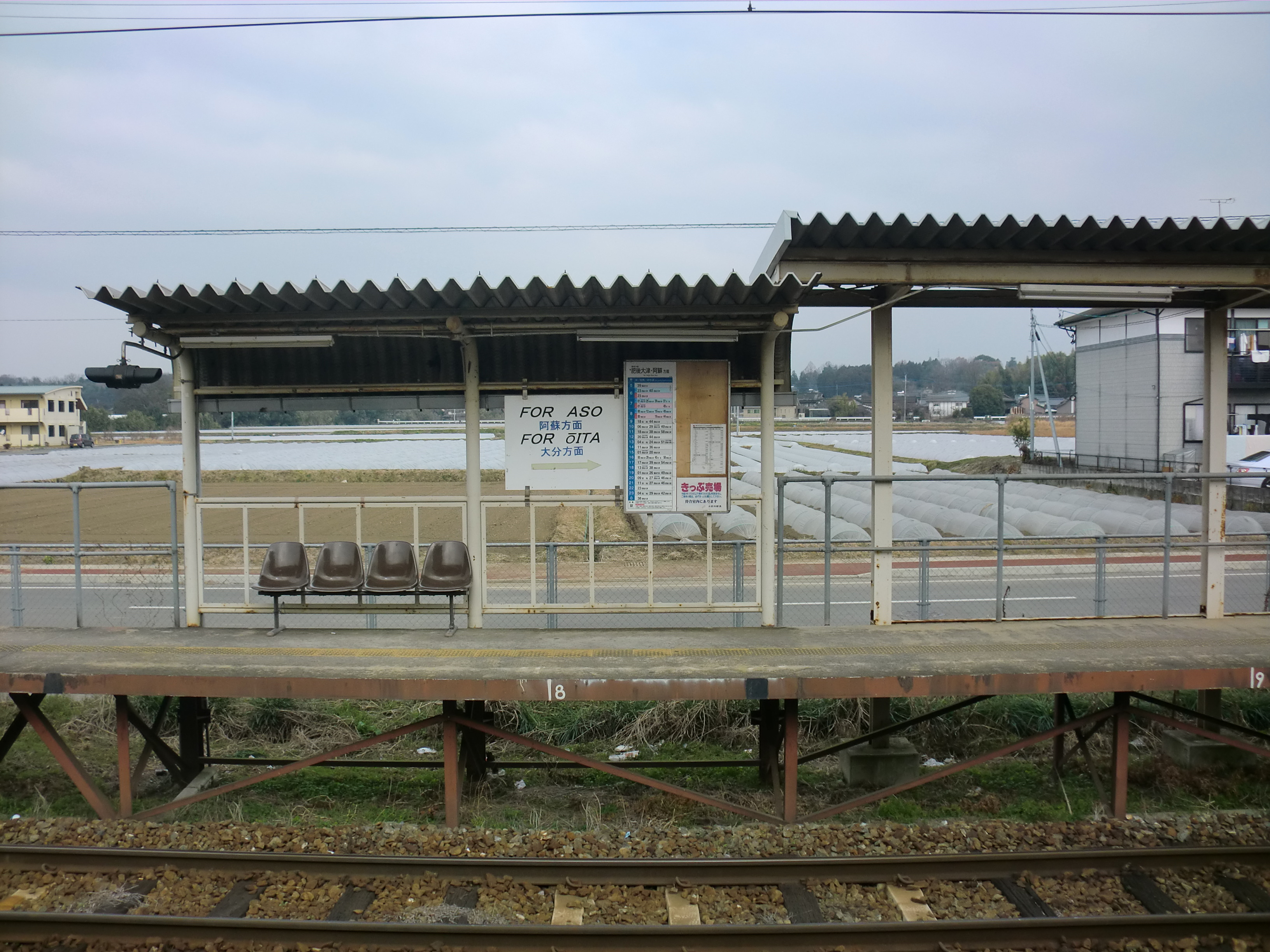
Passenger shelter on platform 2.

== History ==
Japanese Government Railways (JGR) opened Haramizu as an additional station on the existing track of the then Miyagi Light Rail Line (宮地軽便線) (later the Miyagi Line) from Kumamoto eastwards to Higo-Ōzu. By 1928, the track had been extended eastward and had linked up with the Inukai Line (犬飼線) which had been built westward from Ōita. On 2 December 1928, the entire track from Kumamoto to Ōita was designated as the Hōhi Main Line. With the privatization of Japanese National Railways (JNR), the successor of JGR, on 1 April 1987, the station came under the control of JR Kyushu.

== Passenger statistics ==
In fiscal 2020, the station was used by an average of 780 passengers daily (boarding passengers only), and it ranked 167th among the busiest stations of JR Kyushu.

== Surrounding area ==
- Kikuyo Town Hall
- Semiconductor Techno Park

== See also ==
- List of railway stations in Japan
