= Seta Station =

Seta Station (瀬田駅) is the name of two train stations in Japan:

- Seta Station (Kumamoto)
- Seta Station (Shiga)
