= Seta Station (Kumamoto) =

Railway station in Ōzu, Kumamoto Prefecture, Japan

Seta Station 瀬田駅
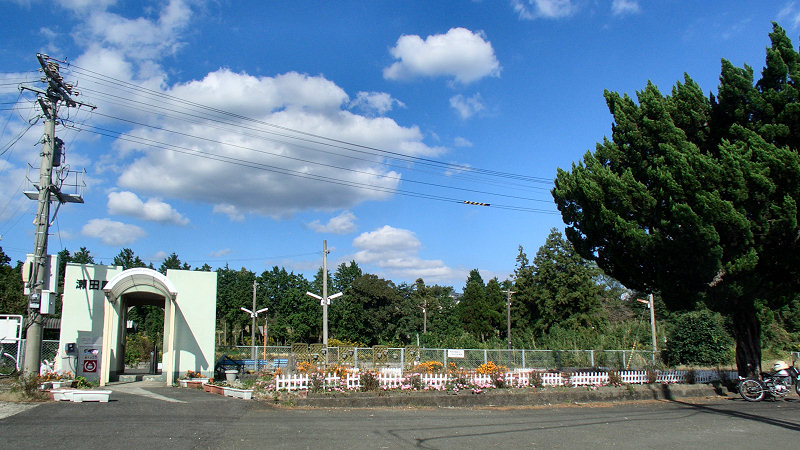
- Seta Station in 2006

General information
- Location: Obayashi, Ōzu-machi, Kikuchigun, Kumamot-ken 869-1219; Japan
- Coordinates: 32°52′21″N 130°54′50″E
- Operator: JR Kyushu
- Line: ■ Hōhi Main Line
- Distance: 27.2 km from Kumamoto
- Platforms: 2 side platforms
- Tracks: 2 + 1 siding

Construction
- Structure type: At grade

Other information
- Status: Unstaffed
- Website: Official website

History
- Opened: 11 November 1916; 109 years ago

Services
Preceding station	JR Kyushu	Following station
Higo-Ōzu towards Kumamoto	Hōhi Main Line	Tateno towards Ōita
Location
- Location within Kumamoto Prefecture Location within Japan

Seta Station (瀬田駅, Seta-eki) is a passenger railway station located in the town of Ōzu, Kumamoto, Japan. It Is operated by JR Kyushu.

== Lines ==
The station is served by the Hōhi Main Line and is located 27.2 km from the starting point of the line at Kumamoto.

== Layout ==
The station consists of two side platforms serving two tracks at grade with a siding. The station building is a small. modern, concrete structure which serves only as a waiting room. Access to the opposite side platform is by means of a level crossing.

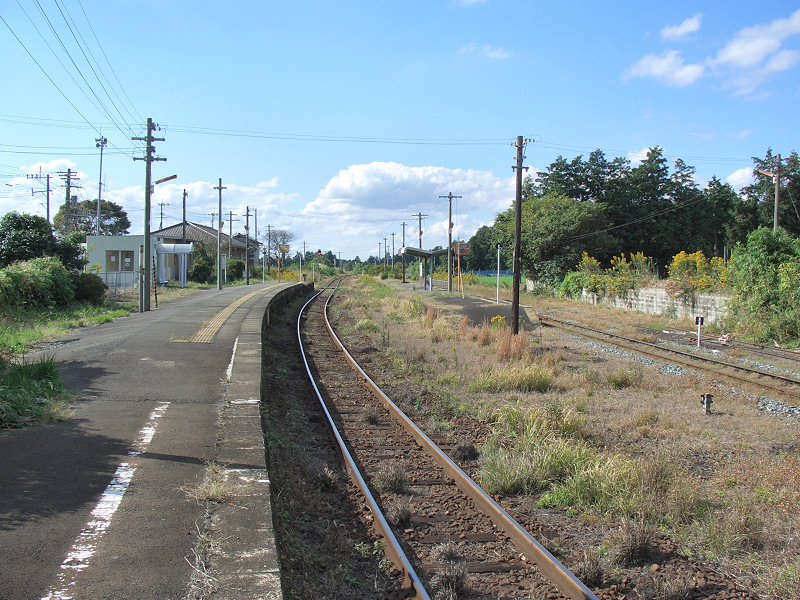
A view of the station platforms and tracks.

== History ==
On 21 June 1914, Japanese Government Railways (JGR) opened the Miyaji Light Rail Line (宮地軽便線) (later the Miyagi Line) from Kumamoto eastwards to Higo-Ōzu. The line was extended eastward in phases and Tateno was established as the new eastern terminal on 11 November 1916. On the same day, Seta was opened as an intermediate station on the new track. From Tateno, the track was extended further east and on 2 December 1928, it was linked up with the Inukai Line (犬飼線), which had been extended westwards in phases from Ōita since 1914. Through-traffic was established between Kumamoto and Ōita. The two lines were merged and the entire stretch redesignated as the Hōhi Main Line. With the privatization of Japanese National Railways (JNR), the successor of JGR, on 1 April 1987, the station came under the control of JR Kyushu.

The track from Higo-Ōzu to Aso was heavily damaged in the 2016 Kumamoto earthquakes and service between the stations, including to Seta was suspended. JR Kyushu commenced repair work, starting first with the sector from Higo-Ōzu to Tateno. Seta Station was little damaged and most of the serious damage was at various locations on the track from Seta to Tateno and beyond. On 8 August 2020, JR Kyushu reopened the Higo-Ōzu to Aso section of the line, permitting access between Aso and Kumamoto.

== Surrounding area ==
- Ōzu Town Ōzu Higashi Elementary School
- Japan National Route 57

== See also ==
- List of railway stations in Japan
