= Ikoi-no-Mura Station =

Railway station in Aso, Kumamoto Prefecture, Japan

Ikoi-no-Mura Station いこいの村駅
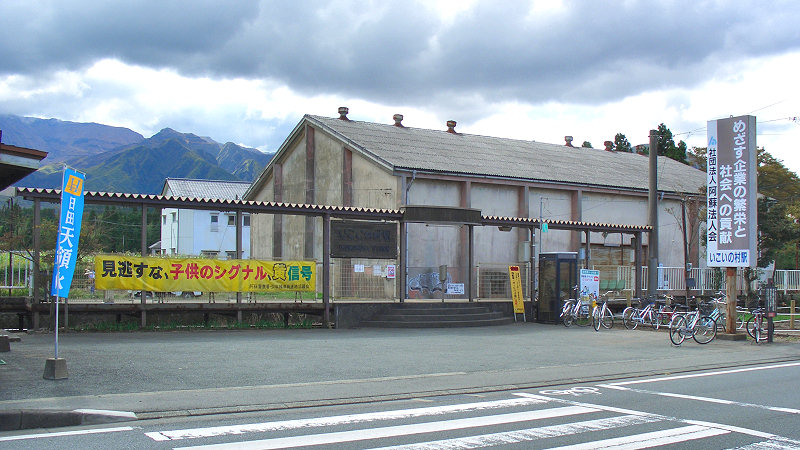
- Ikoi-no-Mura Station in 2006, as seen from Japan National Route 57

General information
- Location: Takawara, Aso-shi, Kumamoto-ken 869-2223; Japan
- Coordinates: 32°56′12″N 131°05′40″E
- Operator: JR Kyushu
- Line: ■ Hōhi Main Line
- Distance: 51.2 km from Kumamoto
- Platforms: 1 side platform
- Tracks: 1

Construction
- Structure type: At grade
- Cycle facilities: Bike shed

Other information
- Status: Unstaffed
- Website: Official website

History
- Opened: 11 March 1989

Services
Preceding station	JR Kyushu	Following station
Aso towards Kumamoto	Hōhi Main Line	Miyaji towards Ōita
Location
- Location within Kumamoto Prefecture Location within Japan

Ikoi-no-Mura Station (いこいの村駅, Ikoi-no-Mura-eki) is a passenger railway station located in the city of Aso, Kumamoto, Japan. It Is operated by JR Kyushu.

== Lines ==
The station is served by the Hōhi Main Line and is located 51.2 km from the starting point of the line at Kumamoto.

== Layout ==
The station consists of a side platform serving a single track. There is no station building, only a shelter on the platform for passengers. A bike shed is provided near the station entrance.

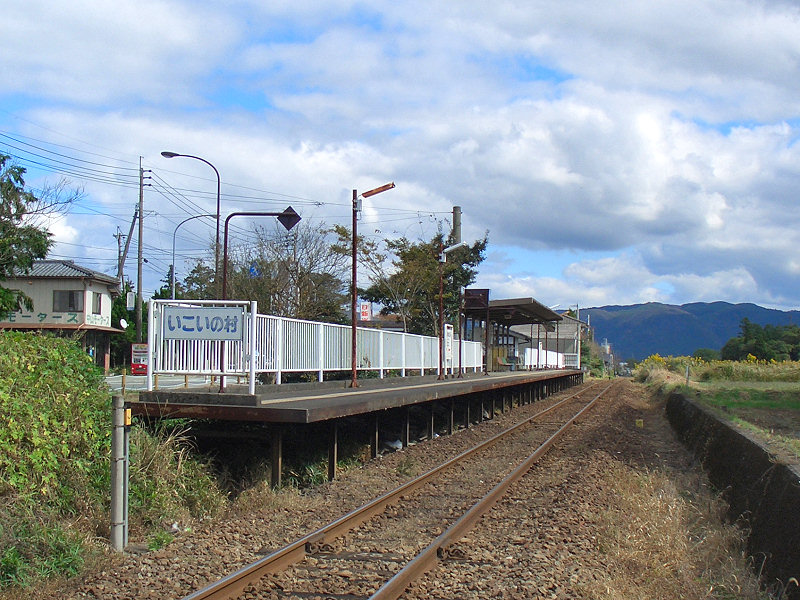
A view of the platform and track.

== History ==
JR Kyushu opened the station on 11 March 1989 as an additional station on the existing track of the Hōhi Main Line.

On 17 September 2017, Typhoon Talim (Typhoon 18) damaged the Hōhi Main Line at several locations. Services between Aso and Nakahanda, including Ikoi-no-Mura, were suspended and replaced by bus services. Rail service from Aso through Ikoi-no-Mura to Miemachi was restored by 22 September 2017 Normal rail services between Aso and Ōita were restored by 2 October 2017.

== Surrounding area ==
- Japan National Route 57

== See also ==
- List of railway stations in Japan
