= Takio Station =

Railway station in Ōita, Ōita Prefecture, Japan

Takio Station 滝尾駅
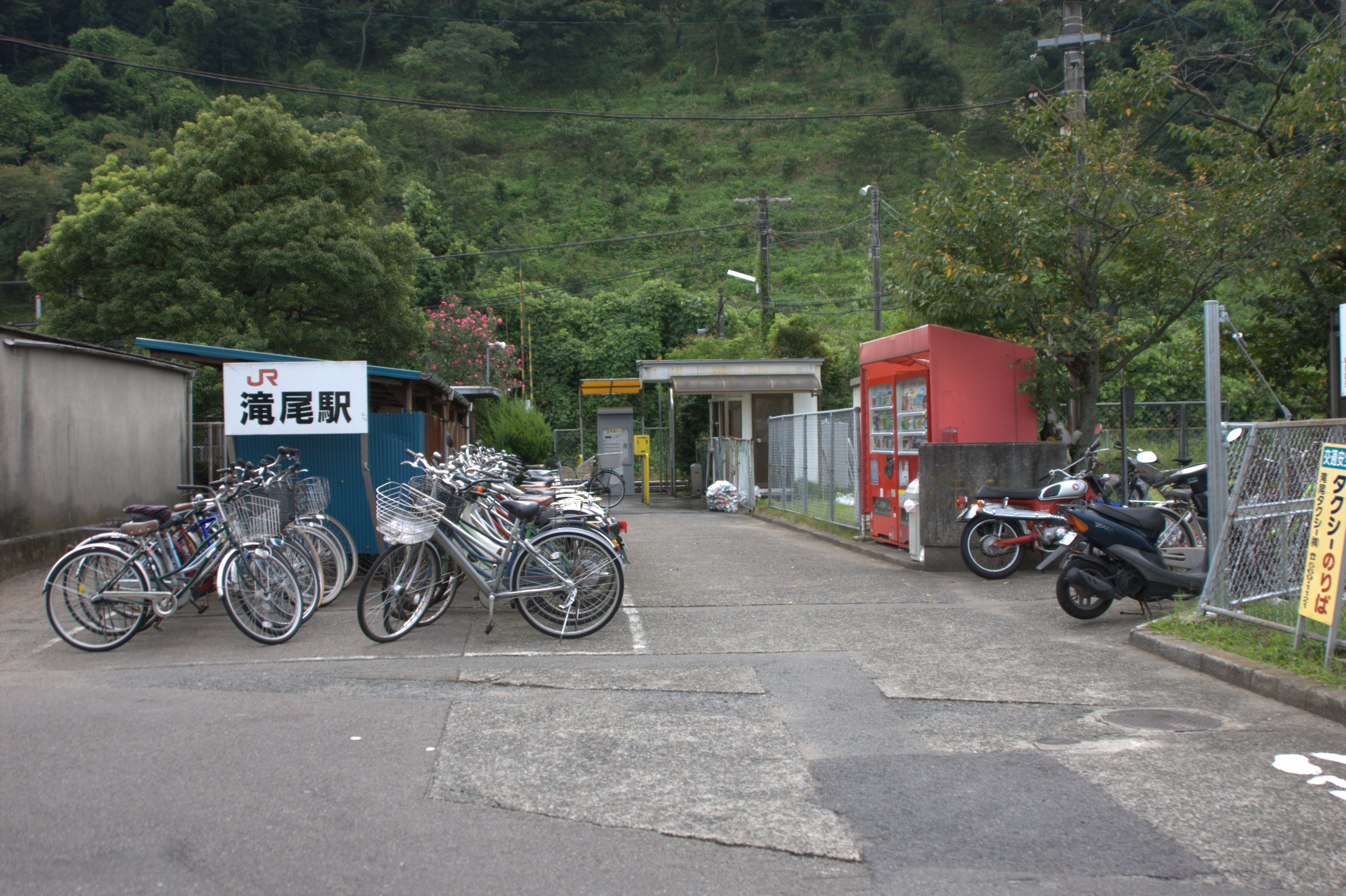
- Takio Station in 2009

General information
- Location: Tsumori, Ōita-shi, Ōita-ken, 870-0945; Japan
- Coordinates: 33°12′34″N 131°37′23″E
- Operator: JR Kyushu
- Line: ■ Hōhi Main Line
- Distance: 142.9 km from Kumamoto
- Platforms: 2 side platforms
- Tracks: 2

Construction
- Structure type: At grade

Other information
- Status: Remotely managed station
- Website: Official website

History
- Opened: 1 April 1914

Passengers
- FY2016: 408 daily
- Rank: 265th (among JR Kyushu stations)

Services
Preceding station	JR Kyushu	Following station
Shikido towards Kumamoto	Hōhi Main Line	Ōita Terminus
Location
- Location within Oita Prefecture Location within Japan

Takio Station (滝尾駅, Takio-eki) is a passenger railway station located in Ōita City, Ōita Prefecture, Japan. It is operated by JR Kyushu.

== Lines ==
The station is served by the Hōhi Main Line and is located 142.9 km from the starting point of the line at Kumamoto.

== Layout ==
The station, which is unstaffed, consists of two side platforms serving two tracks. There is no station building, only shelters on the platforms for waiting passengers. A separate shelter at the station entrance houses an automatic ticket vending machine. There is a ticket booth but this is unstaffed.

=== Platforms ===
1	■ ■ Hōhi Main Line	for Ōita
2	■ ■ Hōhi Main Line	for Bungo-Taketa and Kumamoto

== History ==
On 1 April 1914, JGR opened the Inukai Light Rail Line (犬飼軽便線) (later Inukai Line) from Ōita westwards to Nakahanda. On the same day, Takio was opened as one of several intermediate stations along the track. By 1928, the track had been extended westwards and had linked up with the Miyagi Line (宮地線) reaching eastwards from Kumamoto. On 2 December 1928, the entire track from Kumamoto through Takio to Ōita was designated as the Hōhi Main Line. With the privatization of Japanese National Railways (JNR), the successor of JGR, on 1 April 1987, Takio came under the control of JR Kyushu.

On 17 March 2018, Takio became a "Smart Support Station". Under this scheme, although the station is unstaffed, passengers can receive assistance via intercom from staff at a central support centre.

== Passenger statistics ==
In fiscal 2016, the station was used by an average of 408 passengers daily (boarding passengers only), and it ranked 265th among the busiest stations of JR Kyushu.

== Surrounding area ==
- Magari Stone Buddha - Oita prefecture designated historic site
- Takio Hyakuana Yokoana Tumulus Group - Historic Site designated by Oita City
- Oita City Takio Elementary School
- Oita City Morioka Elementary School

== See also ==
- List of railway stations in Japan
