= Kikuyō, Kumamoto =

Kikuyō 菊陽町
- Town
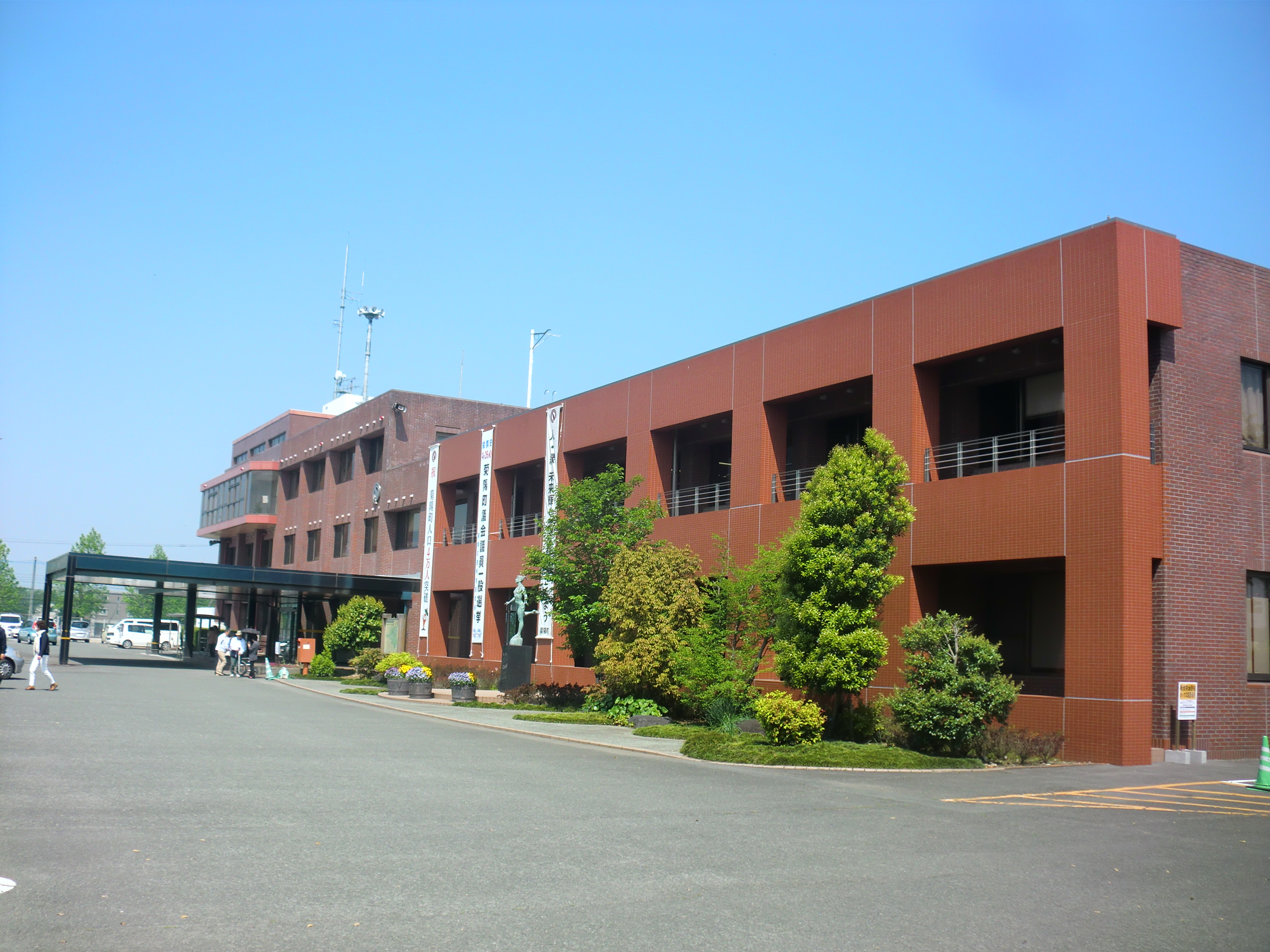
- Kikuyō Town office

- Flag Emblem
- Interactive map of Kikuyō
- Location in Japan
- Coordinates: 32°51′45″N 130°49′43″E
- Country: Japan
- Region: Kyushu
- Prefecture: Kumamoto
- District: Kikuchi

Area
  - Total: 37.46 km^{2} (14.46 sq mi)

Population (July 31, 2024)
  - Total: 43,852
  - Density: 1,171/km^{2} (3,032/sq mi)
- Time zone: UTC+09:00 (JST)
- City hall address: 2800 Kubota, Kikuyo-machi, Kikuchi-gun, Kumamoto-ken 869-1192
- Website: Official website
- Symbols
- Bird: Eurasian skylark
- Flower: Chrysanthemum
- Tree: Cryptomeria

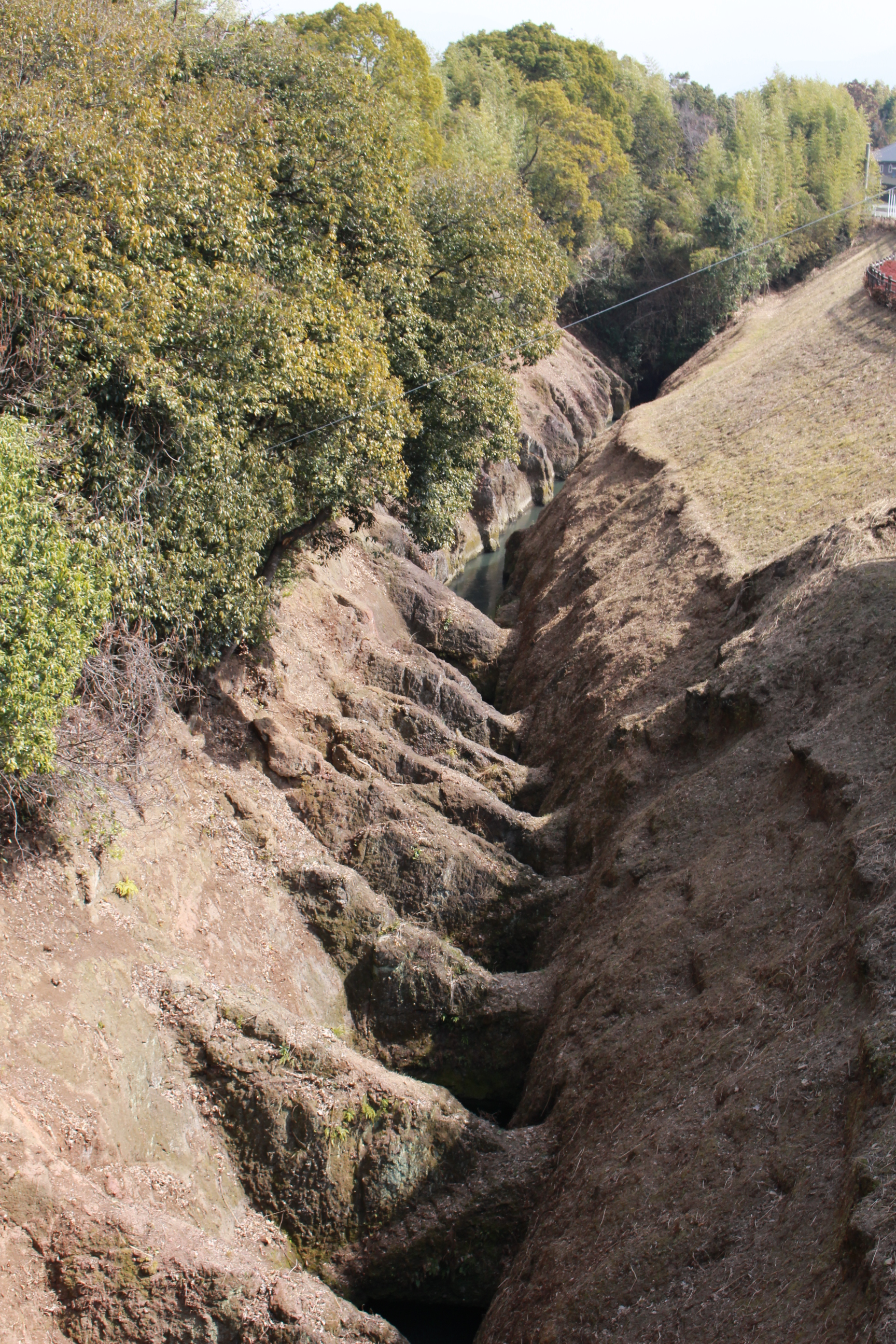
290pxHanaguri Ide (Baba Kusunoide canal)

Kikuyō (菊陽町, Kikuyō-machi) is a town located in Kikuchi District, Kumamoto Prefecture, Japan. As of 31 July 2024, the town had an estimated population of 43,852 in 19,715 households, and a population density of 1200 persons per km^{2}. The total area of the town is 37.46 km^{2} (14.46 sq mi).

== Geography ==
Kikuyō is located in central Kumamoto Prefecture, adjacent to the northeast side of Kumamoto City. The Shirakawa River flows west through the central-southern part of the town, with river terraces spreading along the banks. The Horikawa River also flows through the northern part of the town, and numerous irrigation canals run through the river basin.

=== Neighboring municipalities ===
Kumamoto Prefecture

- Kōshi
- Kumamoto
- Mashiki
- Ōzu

=== Climate ===
Kikuyō has a humid subtropical climate (Köppen Cfa) characterized by warm summers and cool winters with light to no snowfall. The average annual temperature in Kikuyō is 15.3 °C. The average annual rainfall is 1965 mm with September as the wettest month. The temperatures are highest on average in August, at around 26.1 °C, and lowest in January, at around 4.6 °C.

=== Demographics ===
Per Japanese census data, the population of Kikuyō is as shown below

Historical population
| Year | Pop. | ±% |
|---|---|---|
| 1940 | 8,815 | — |
| 1950 | 12,100 | +37.3% |
| 1960 | 11,304 | −6.6% |
| 1970 | 10,881 | −3.7% |
| 1980 | 20,152 | +85.2% |
| 1990 | 24,154 | +19.9% |
| 2000 | 28,360 | +17.4% |
| 2010 | 37,734 | +33.1% |
| 2020 | 43,337 | +14.8% |

== History ==
The area of Kikuyō was part of ancient Higo Province, During the Edo Period it was part of the holdings of Kumamoto Domain. After the Meiji restoration, the villages of Tsuda, Haramizu and Shirasui was established with the creation of the modern municipalities system on April 1, 1889.The three villages merged on April 1, 1955 to form the village of Kikuyō. On January 1, 1969 Kikuyō was raised to town status.

== Government ==
Kikuyō has a mayor-council form of government with a directly elected mayor and a unicameral city council of 18 members. Kikuyō, collectively with the other municipalities in Kikuchi District, contributes two members to the Kumamoto Prefectural Assembly. In terms of national politics, the city is part of the Kumamoto 3rd district of the lower house of the Diet of Japan.

== Economy ==
Kikuyō has a mixed economy based on agriculture, notably in the southern and eastern parts of the town around the Shirakawa River. Kikuyō is known for its Kikuyō carrots. From the 1980s onwards, numerous semiconductor manufacturers have located production plants in Kikuyō, and the semiconductor and semiconductor-related industries now dominate the industrial sector of the local economy. The town is growing, due to the presence of a Tokyo Electric plant and the current construction of a new Fujifilm plant on highway 57.

== Education ==
Kikuyō has six public elementary schools and two public junior high schools operated by the town government. The town does not have a high school. Kumamoto-based Shokei College has a campus in Kikuyō.

== Transportation ==
=== Railways ===
JR Kyushu - Hōhi Main Line

- Haramizu - Sanrigi

=== Highways ===
The Kyushu Expressway passes through Kikuyō, but there is no interchange within the town borders.

- National Route 57
- National Route 443

== Notable people from Kikuyō ==
- Masanobu Komaki, football player
- Takashi Sawada, football player
- Daisuke Yano, football player
