= Hōhi Main Line =

Railway line in Kyushu, Japan

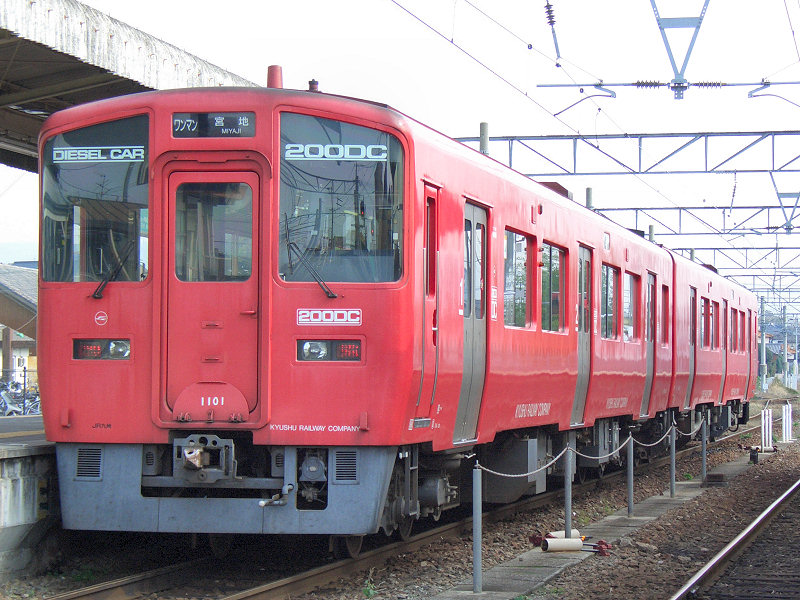

Overview
- Owner: JR Kyushu
- Locale: Kyushu
- Termini: Ōita; Kumamoto
- Stations: 37

Service
- Type: Heavy rail

History
- Opened: 1 April 1914; 112 years ago

Technical
- Line length: 148.0 km (92.0 mi)
- Track gauge: 1,067 mm (3 ft 6 in)
- Electrification: 20 kV AC (60 Hz)
Route map
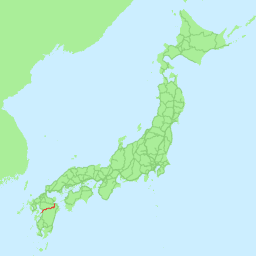

The Hōhi Main Line (豊肥本線, Hōhi-honsen) is a railway line in Kyushu, southern Japan, operated by the Kyushu Railway Company (JR Kyushu). It connects the west and east coasts of the island. The line originates at Kumamoto Station in Kumamoto and ends at the terminal of Ōita Station in Ōita.

== Data ==
- Gauge: 1,067 mm (3 ft 6 in)
- Length: 148.0 km
- Stations: 37 (including terminals)
- Track: Single track
- Electrification:
  - Kumamoto - Higo Ōzu: 20 kV AC (60 Hz)
  - Higo Ōzu - Ōita: None
- Maximum service speed: 95 km/h (59 mph)

== Stations ==
•: Stops, |: Passes through

Stations		Distance (km)	Rapid Hōhi Liner	Transfers	Location	
Kumamoto	熊本	0.0	•	■ Kagoshima Main Line Kyushu Shinkansen; Kumamoto City Transportation Bureau: Trunk Line・Tasaki Line (Kumamoto-Ekimae Station)	Nishi-ku, Kumamoto	Kumamoto
Heisei	平成	2.7	|		Chūō-ku, Kumamoto	Kumamoto
Minami Kumamoto	南熊本	3.6	|		Chūō-ku, Kumamoto	Kumamoto
Shin Suizenji	新水前寺	5.2	•	Kumamoto City Transportation Bureau: Trunk Line (Suizenji-Ekidori Station)	Chūō-ku, Kumamoto	Kumamoto
Suizenji	水前寺	5.8	•		Chūō-ku, Kumamoto	Kumamoto
Tōkai Gakuen-mae	東海学園前	7.8	|		Higashi-ku, Kumamoto	Kumamoto
Tatsutaguchi	竜田口	8.9	|		Kita-ku, Kumamoto	Kumamoto
Musashizuka	武蔵塚	12.9	•		Kita-ku, Kumamoto	Kumamoto
Hikarinomori	光の森	14.8	•		Kita-ku, Kumamoto	Kumamoto
Sanrigi	三里木	15.8	|		Kikuyō	Kumamoto
Haramizu	原水	18.9	|		Kikuyō	Kumamoto
Higo Ōzu	肥後大津	22.6	•		Ōzu	Kumamoto
Seta	瀬田	27.2			Ōzu	Kumamoto
Tateno	立野	32.3		■ Minamiaso Railway Takamori Line	Minamiaso	Kumamoto
Akamizu	赤水	40.2			Aso	Kumamoto
Ichinokawa	市ノ川	42.6			Aso	Kumamoto
Uchinomaki	内牧	46.4			Aso	Kumamoto
Aso	阿蘇	49.9			Aso	Kumamoto
Ikoi no Mura	いこいの村	51.2			Aso	Kumamoto
Miyaji	宮地	53.4			Aso	Kumamoto
Namino	波野	64.1			Aso	Kumamoto
Takimizu	滝水	69.0			Aso	Kumamoto
Bungo-Ogi	豊後荻	75.2			Taketa	Ōita
Tamarai	玉来	84.9			Taketa	Ōita
Bungo-Taketa	豊後竹田	88.0			Taketa	Ōita
Asaji	朝地	93.9			Bungo-Ōno	Ōita
Ogata	緒方	100.3			Bungo-Ōno	Ōita
Bungo-Kiyokawa	豊後清川	105.4			Bungo-Ōno	Ōita
Miemachi	三重町	111.9			Bungo-Ōno	Ōita
Sugao	菅尾	117.3			Bungo-Ōno	Ōita
Inukai	犬飼	125.2			Bungo-Ōno	Ōita
Takenaka	竹中	130.8			Ōita	Ōita
Naka-Handa	中判田	136.3			Ōita	Ōita
Ōita-Daigaku-mae	大分大学前	138.8			Ōita	Ōita
Shikido	敷戸	140.2			Ōita	Ōita
Takio	滝尾	142.9			Ōita	Ōita
Ōita	大分	148.0		■ Nippō Main Line ■ Kyūdai Main Line	Ōita	Ōita

== History ==
Construction of the line commenced from both Oita and Kumamoto in 1914, with connection being achieved with the opening of the Miyaji–Tamarai section in 1928.

Steam locomotives were withdrawn from the line in 1973, and CTC signalling was commissioned on the entire line in 1983. The 22.5 km Kumamoto–Higoozu section was electrified in 1999.

=== Damages by natural disasters ===
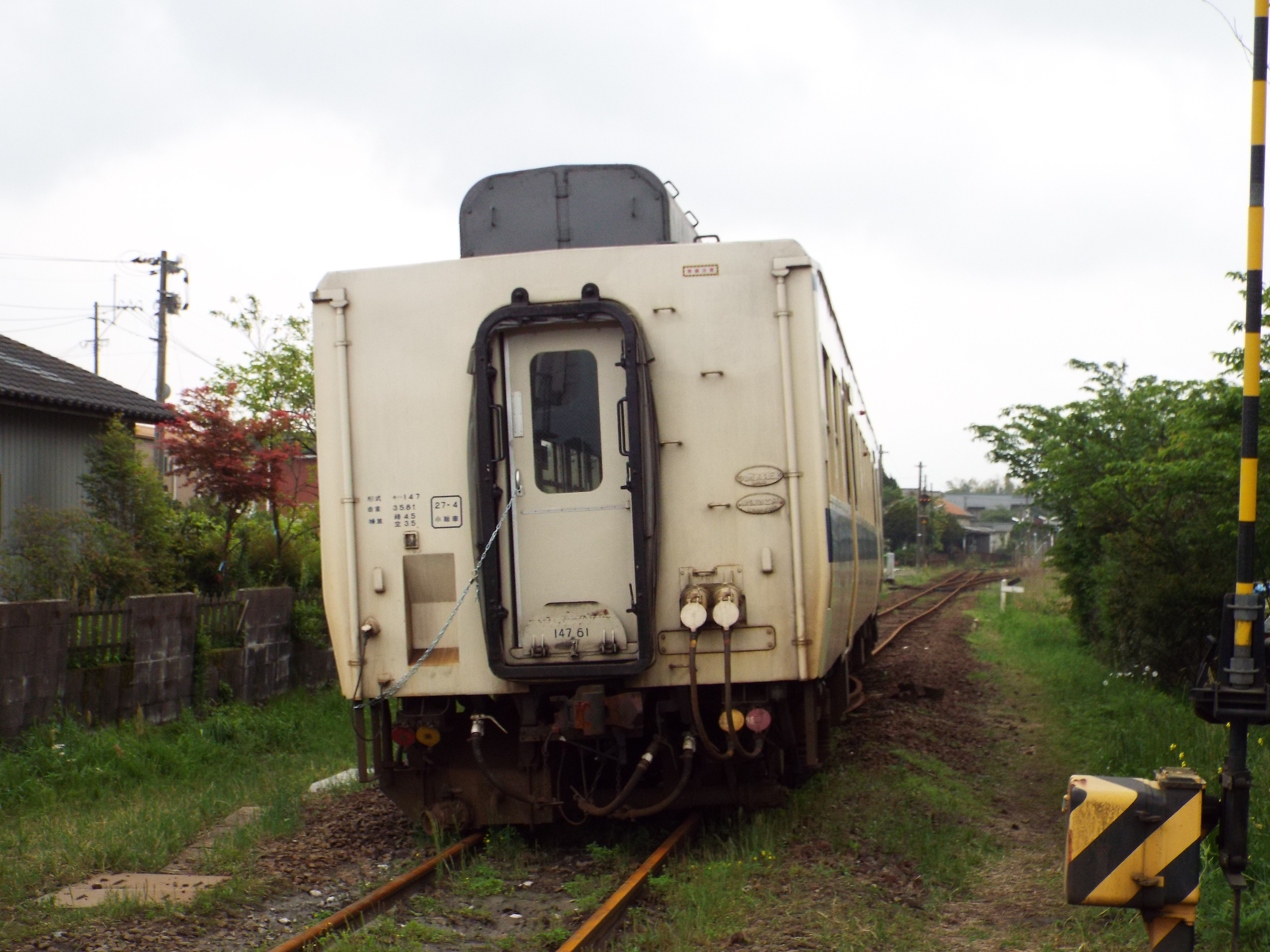
A derailed KiHa 147 series train after the 2016 Kumamoto earthquakes

In 1990-91, the line was severed for a year by landslides caused by torrential rain, with a further eight-month period of disruption occurring in 1993-94.

A three-month period of disruption occurred in 2004, and the line was severed from July 2012 until August 2013 due to further landslides induced by torrential rainfall.

In 2016, damage caused by the Kumamoto Earthquakes resulted in the closure of the section between Higo Ozu and Aso. The line has been restored since 8 August 2020.

=== Former connecting lines ===
- Minami Kumamoto Station: the 29 km Yūen Railway to Tomochi opened in sections between 1915 and 1932, and closed in 1964.
- Kamikumamoto Station: the 22 km 762 mm (2 ft 6 in) gauge Kumamoto Light Railway to Otsu opened 1907 and 1914, with a 2.4 km branch to Suizenji. Despite proposals to regauge the line to 1,067 mm (3 ft 6 in) gauge and electrify it, the anticipated development of the area did not occur at an acceptable rate and the line was closed in 1921.
