= Ōzu, Kumamoto =

Ōzu 大津町
- Town
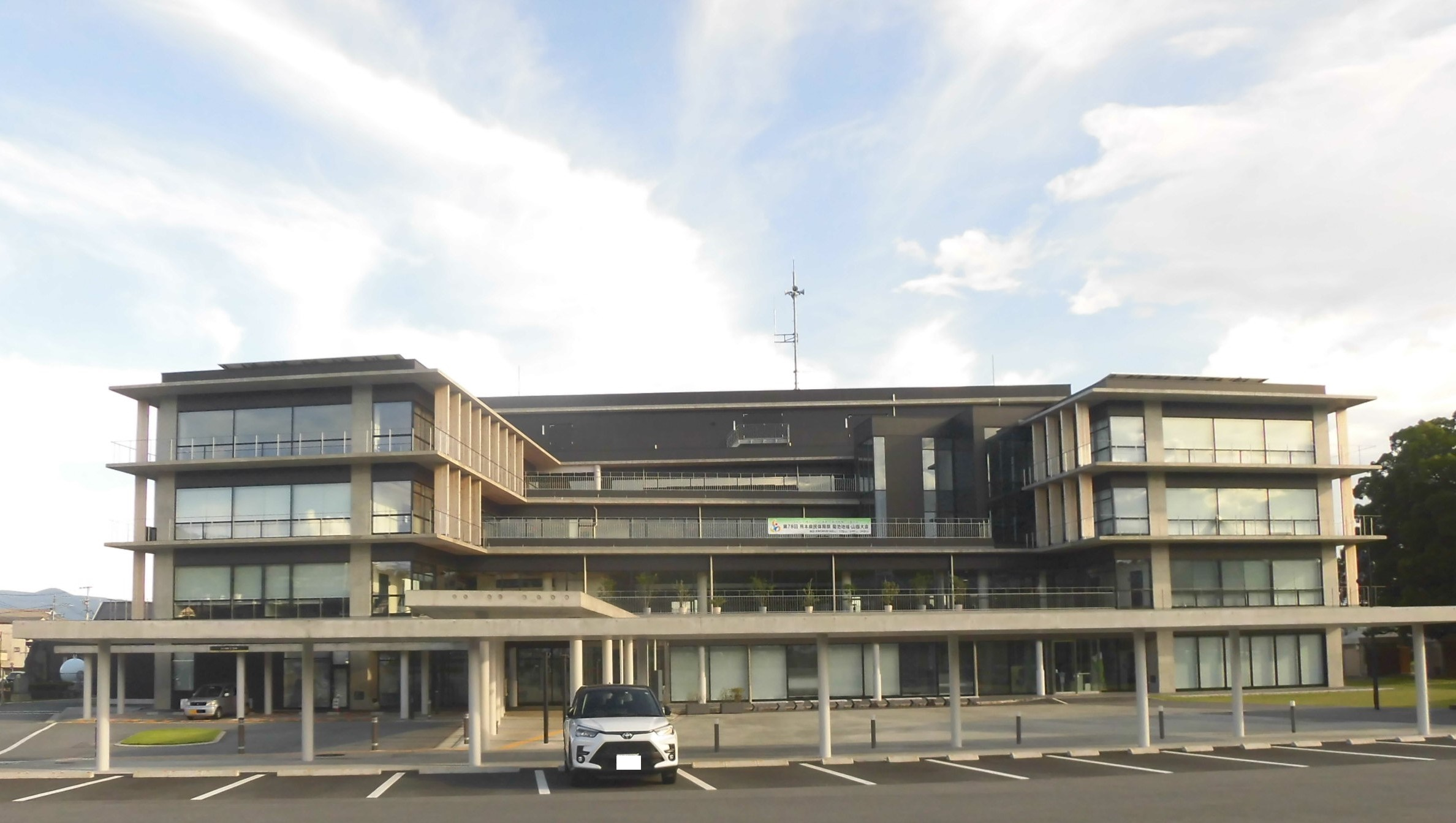
- Ōzu Town Hall in 2023

- Flag Seal
- Location of Ōzu in Kumamoto Prefecture

- Location in Japan
- Coordinates: 32°52′44″N 130°52′06″E
- Country: Japan
- Region: Kyushu
- Prefecture: Kumamoto
- District: Kikuchi

Area
  - Total: 99.10 km^{2} (38.26 sq mi)

Population (July 31, 2024)
  - Total: 36,053
  - Density: 363.8/km^{2} (942.2/sq mi)
- Time zone: UTC+09:00 (JST)
- City hall address: 1233 Ozu, Ozu-machi, Kikuchi-gun, Kumamoto-ken 869-1292
- Website: Official website
- Symbols
- Bird: Meadow bunting
- Flower: Azalea
- Tree: Cryptomeria

Ōzu (大津町, Ōzu-machi) is a town located in Kikuchi District, Kumamoto Prefecture, Japan. As of 31 July 2024, the town had an estimated population of 36,053 in 16240 households, and a population density of 520 persons per km^{2}. The total area of the town is 99.10 km^{2} (38.26 sq mi).

== Geography ==
Ōzu is located about 19 kilometers east-northeast from the center of Kumamoto City, the prefectural capital, at the eastern edge of the Kumamoto Plain and the Kumamoto metropolitan area. The town lies at the base of Mt Aso, to the west of the mountain. The Shirakawa River flows west through the southern part of the town. The urban center of Ōzu is located in the western part of the town's geographic area.

Ōzu was near the epicenter of the 2016 Kumamoto earthquakes.

=== Neighboring municipalities ===
Kumamoto Prefecture

- Aso
- Kikuchi
- Kikuyō
- Kōshi
- Mashiki
- Minamiaso
- Nishihara

=== Climate ===
Ōzu has a humid subtropical climate (Köppen Cfa) characterized by warm summers and cool winters with light to no snowfall. The average annual temperature in Ōzu is 14.0 °C. The average annual rainfall is 2000 mm with September being the wettest month. The temperatures are highest on average in August, at around 24.9 °C, and lowest in January, at around 3.1 °C.

=== Demographics ===
According to Japanese census data, the historical population of Ōzu is as shown below

Historical population
Year	Pop.	±%
1960	21,885	—
1970	18,322	−16.3%
1980	19,894	+8.6%
1990	23,744	+19.4%
2000	28,021	+18.0%
2010	31,234	+11.5%
2020	35,187	+12.7%

== History ==
The area of Ōzu was part of the ancient Higo Province. During the Edo Period it was part of the holdings of the Kumamoto Domain. After the Meiji restoration, the town of Ōzu was established with the creation of the modern municipalities system on April 1, 1889.

== Government ==
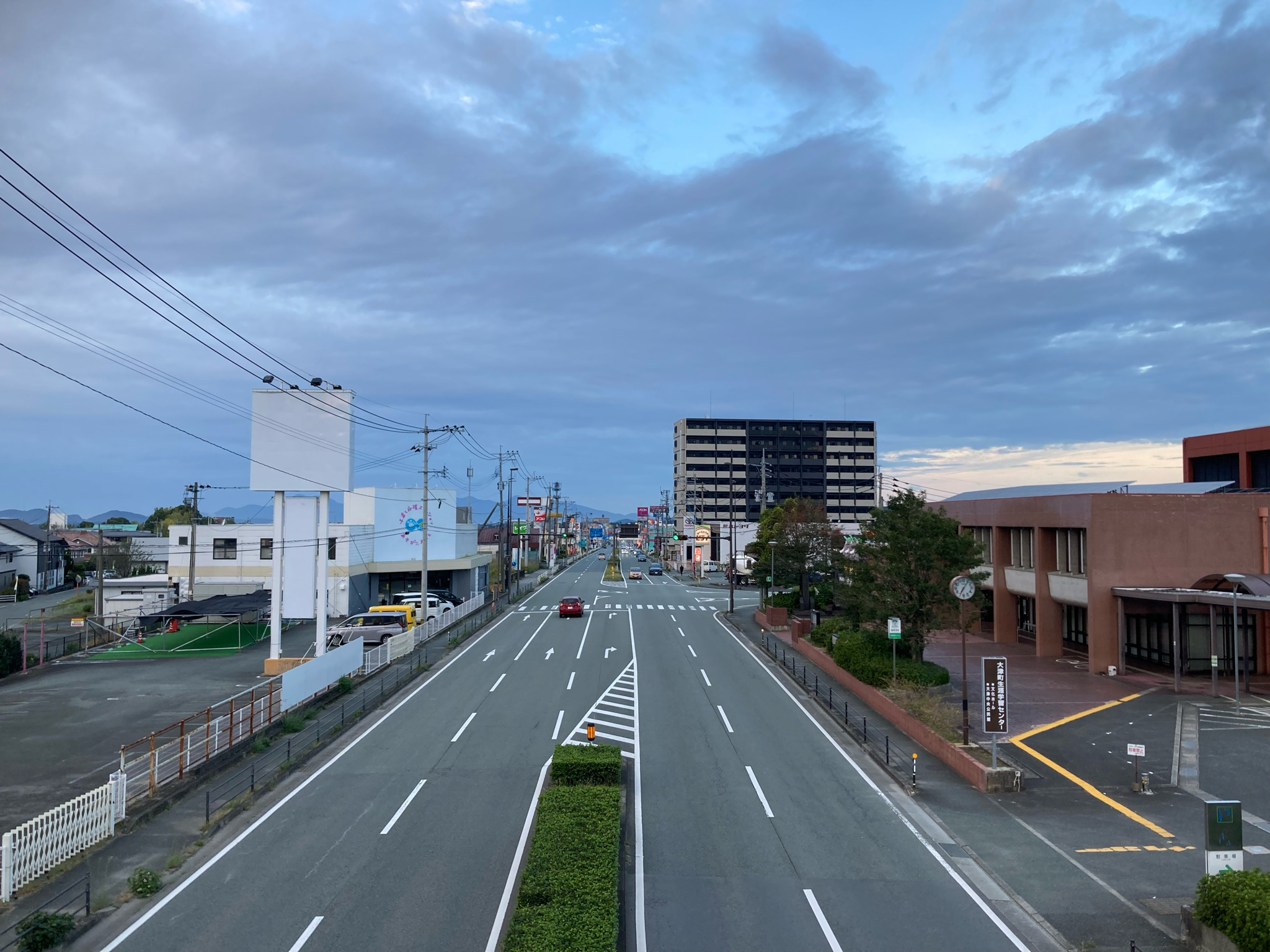
National Route 57 Ōzu Town

has a mayor-council form of government with a directly elected mayor and a unicameral town council of 16 members. Ōzu, collectively with the other municipalities of Kikuchi District contributes two members to the Kumamoto Prefectural Assembly. In terms of national politics, the town is part of the Kumamoto 3rd district of the lower house of the Diet of Japan.

== Economy ==
Ōzu has an economy dominated by agriculture and manufacturing. Notably, there is a large Honda motorcycle factory located in Ōzu that employs people from around the world. There are many cattle farms in the area, and local farmers both raise cattle, and grow crops to provide feed for them. Ōzu is also known for its sweet potatoes (karaimo).

In 2024, after Taiwan Semiconductor Manufacturing Co. (TSMC) chose neighbouring Kikuyō as the location to build its second Japanese plant, Ōzu experienced the sharpest increase in commercial and industrial land prices of any area of Japan for the period ending July 1. This demand for land has caused problems for local farmers who rent farmland, since land owners have been asked to end their rental agreements early, giving up the land. In addition, local farmers are feeling a tension between possible short-term financial returns, and a wish to pass their farms on to their heirs as working farms.

== Education ==
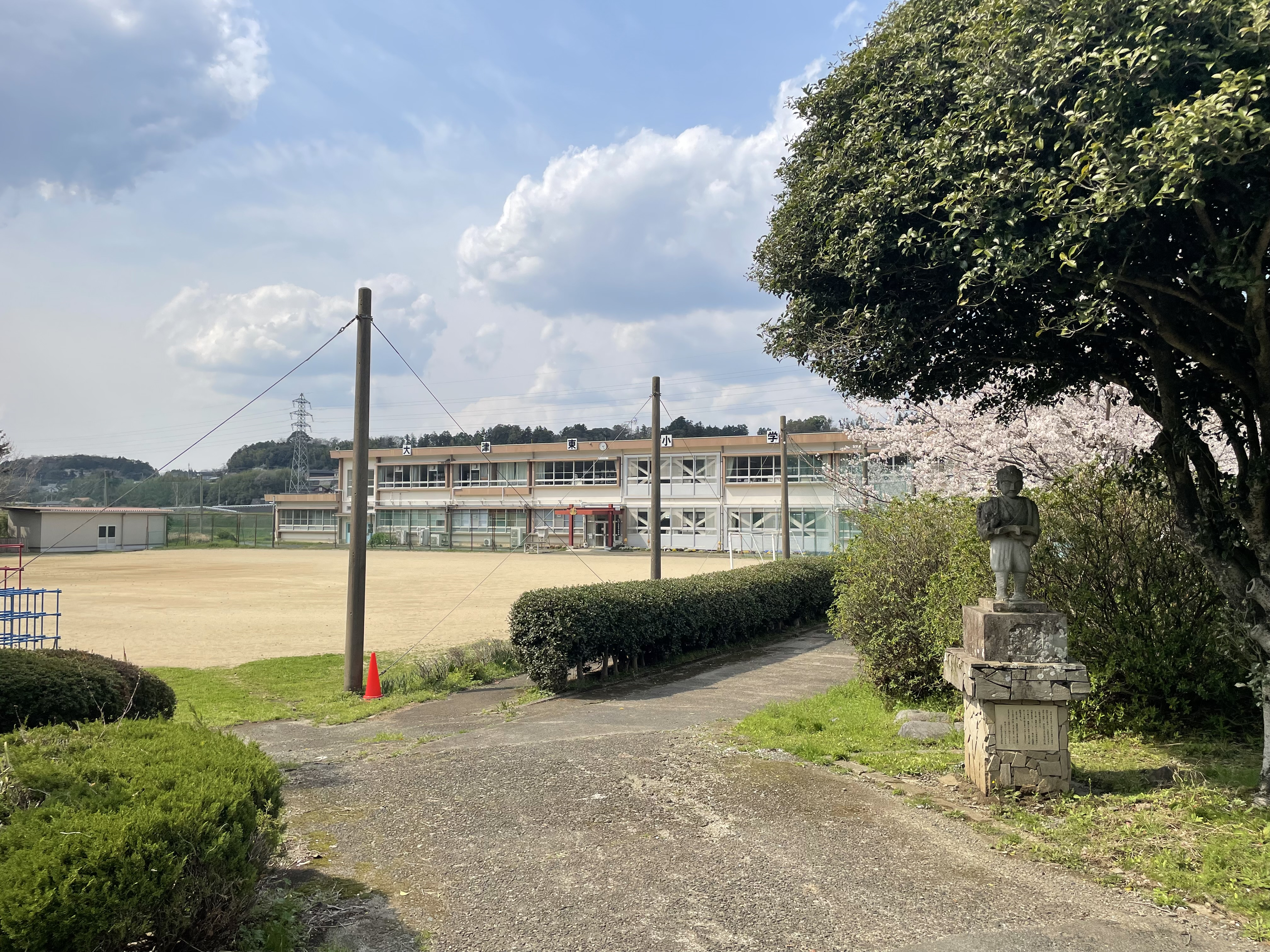
Ozu Higashi Elementary School

has seven public elementary schools and two public junior high schools operated by the town government, and two public high schools operated by the Kumamoto Prefectural Board of Education. The prefecture also operates one special education school for the handicapped.

== Transportation ==
=== Railways ===
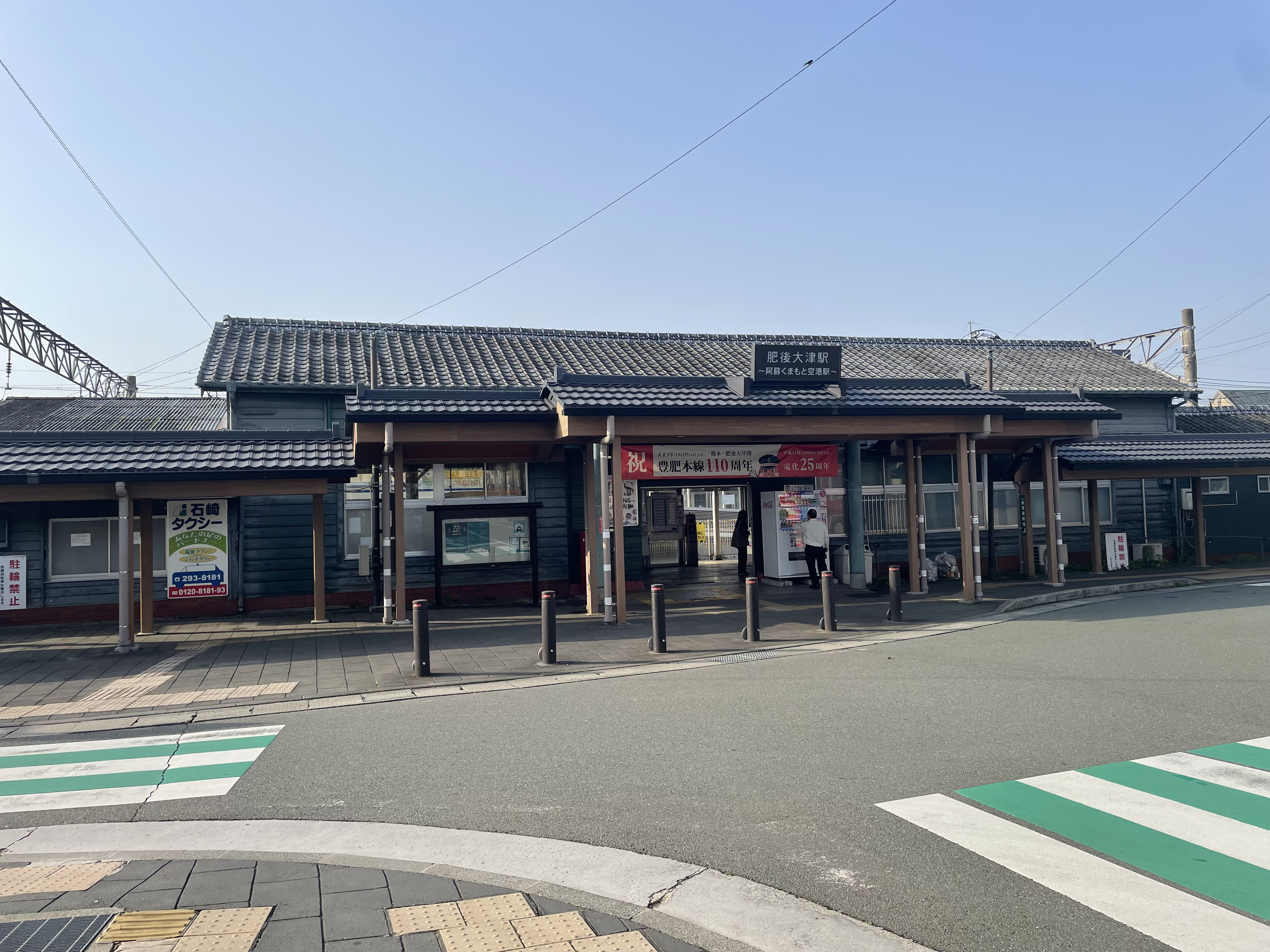
Higo-Ozu Station

JR Kyushu - Hōhi Main Line

- Seta - Higo-Ōzu

=== Highways ===
- National Route 57
- National Route 325
- National Route 443

=== Airport ===
While Aso Kumamoto Airport itself is not in Ōzu, Higa Ōzu station is where airport liner buses provide the easiest public transport access to the airport.

== Attractions ==
The town is known for its Azalea (tsutsuji) Festival in the spring. Prior to the 2020 COVID outbreak, the town held the Ōzu Town Jizo festival in late August, however this festival has been on hiatus since COVID.

Ōzu has one of the oldest homes in Kikuchi District that opens twice a year for tourists, and a racing track. Ōzu’s location on the edge of the caldera that surrounds Mount Aso provides scenic views, and access to the mountain.
