= Kumagawa =

Japanese limited express train service

Overview
- Service type: Limited express
- First service: 1959
- Current operator: JR Kyushu

Route
- Line used: 110 km/h (70 mph)

Technical
- Rolling stock: KiHa 185 series DMU

The Kumagawa (くまがわ) is a limited express train service in Japan operated by Kyushu Railway Company (JR Kyushu), which runs between Kumamoto and Hitoyoshi.

== Rolling stock ==
=== Present ===
- KiHa 185 series DMU: 1992–Present

=== Past ===
- KiHa 58/65 DMU
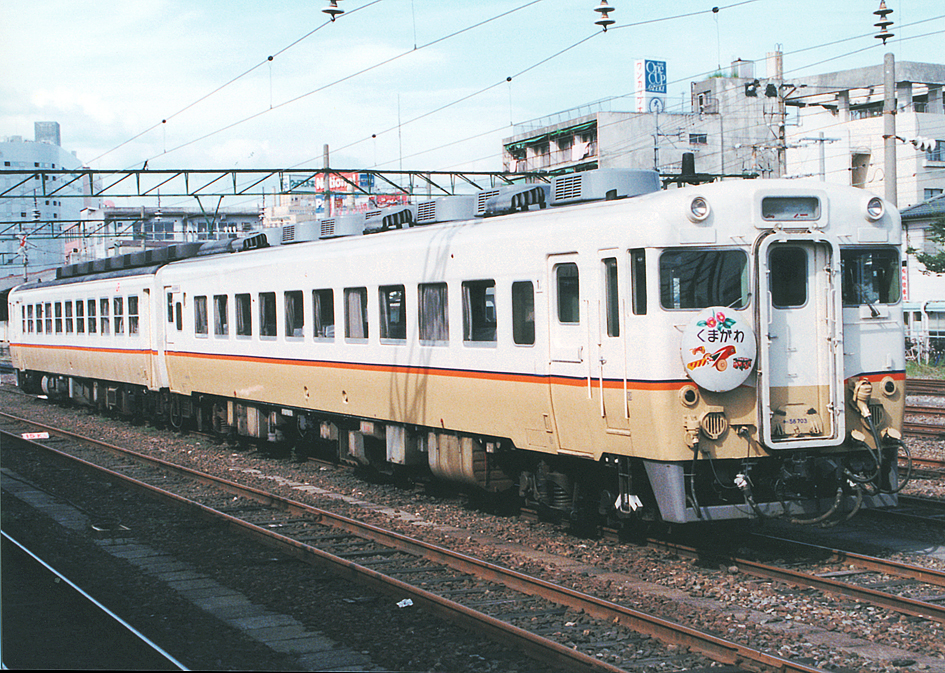
KiHa 58 Kumagawa in 1992

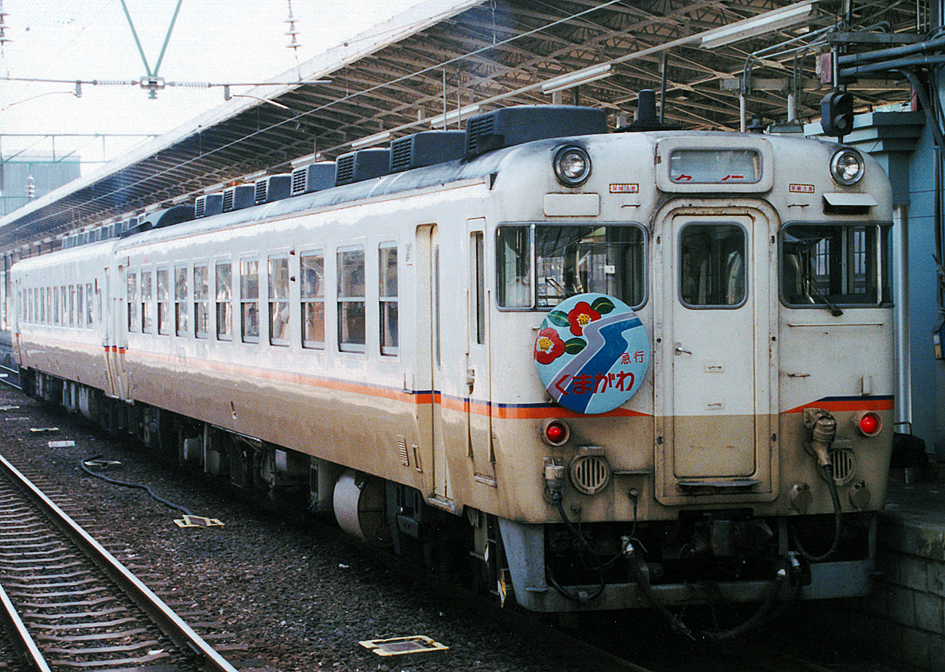
KiHa 65 Kumagawa in 1992

== History ==
The Kumagawa was first introduced from 1 April 1959 as a semi-express service between Mojiko and Hitoyoshi. From 5 March 1966, the train was upgraded to become an express service.
