= Masanobu Komaki =

Japanese footballer (born 1992)

Masanobu Komaki 小牧成亘
Personal information
- Full name: Masanobu Komaki
- Date of birth: 28 April 1992 (age 34)
- Place of birth: Kikuyō, Kumamoto, Japan
- Height: 1.73 m (5 ft 8 in)
- Position: Midfielder

Team information
- Current team: Vanraure Hachinohe
- Number: 6

Youth career
- 2011–2014: Komazawa University

Senior career*
Years	Team	Apps	(Gls)
2015–2018	Roasso Kumamoto	0	(0)
2017	→ Azul Claro Numazu (loan)	13	(4)
2018–2019	Fujieda MYFC	14	(0)
2019–2020	Vanraure Hachinohe	30	(3)
2020–2021	Gainare Tottori	45	(0)
2021–	Vanraure Hachinohe	40	(1)
- * Club domestic league appearances and goals as of 29 August 2023

Masanobu Komaki (小牧成亘, Komaki Masanobu; born 28 April 1992 in Kikuyō, Kumamoto) is a Japanese footballer who plays for Vanraure Hachinohe.

== Club statistics ==
Updated to 23 February 2019.

Club performance			League		Cup		Total	
Season	Club	League	Apps	Goals	Apps	Goals	Apps	Goals
Japan			League		Emperor's Cup		Total	
2015	Roasso Kumamoto	J2 League	0	0	0	0	0	0
2016	Roasso Kumamoto	J2 League	0	0	2	0	2	0
2017	Azul Claro Numazu	J3 League	13	4	3	1	16	5
2018	Fujieda MYFC	J3 League	14	0	0	0	14	0
Career total			27	4	5	1	42	5
