= Higo-Ōzu Station =

Railway station in Ōzu, Kumamoto Prefecture, Japan

Higo-Ōzu Station 肥後大津駅
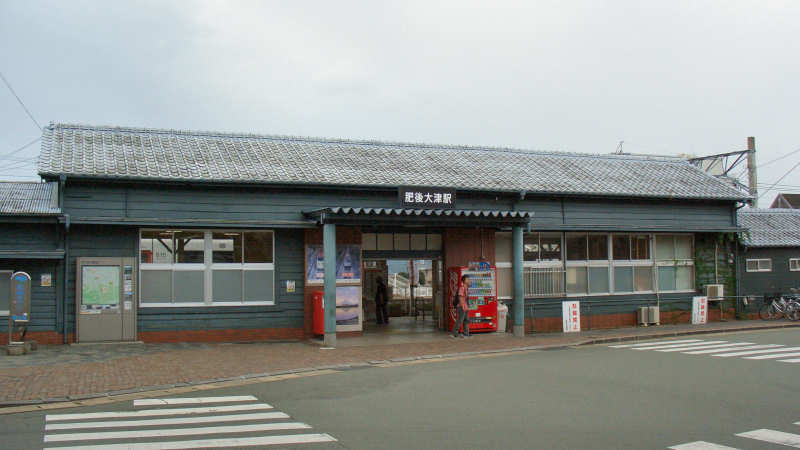
- North entrance of Higo-Ōzu Station in 2006

General information
- Location: Muro, Ōzu-machi, Kikuchi-gun, Kumamoto-ken 869-1235; Japan
- Coordinates: 32°52′39″N 130°51′58″E
- Operator: JR Kyushu
- Line: ■ Hōhi Main Line
- Distance: 22.6 km from Kumamoto
- Platforms: 1 side + island platforms
- Tracks: 3
- Connections: Kumamoto Airport Liner (bus)

Construction
- Structure type: At grade

Other information
- Status: Staffed ticket window Midori no Madoguchi (outsourced)
- Website: Official website

History
- Opened: 21 June 1914; 112 years ago

Passengers
- FY2020: 2049 daily
- Rank: 68th (among JR Kyushu stations)

Services
Preceding station	JR Kyushu	Following station
Haramizu towards Kumamoto	Hōhi Main Line	Seta towards Ōita
Location
- Location within Kumamoto Prefecture Location within Japan

Higo-Ōzu Station (肥後大津駅, Higo-Ōzu-eki) is a passenger railway station located in the town of Ōzu, Kumamoto, Japan. It Is operated by JR Kyushu.

== Lines ==
The station is served by the Hōhi Main Line and is located 22.6 km from the starting point of the line at Kumamoto.

== Layout ==
The station consists of a side platform and an island platform serving three tracks at grade. The station building is located on the north side and is a traditional Japanese style wooden structure which houses a staffed ticket window and a waiting room. Another, more modern building, built in 2011 is located at the south entrance. This houses the Ōzu town visitor centre. The bus stop for the Kumamoto Airport Liner shuttle is also situated in front of this building. Access to the platforms and between the station building and the visitor centre is by means of a level crossing.

Management of the station has been outsourced to the JR Kyushu Tetsudou Eigyou Co., a wholly owned subsidiary of JR Kyushu specialising in station services. It staffs the ticket window which is equipped with a Midori no Madoguchi facility.

=== Platforms ===
1, 2, 3	■ ■ Hōhi Main Line	for Kumamoto
1, 2, 3	■ ■ Hōhi Main Line	for Aso and Oita

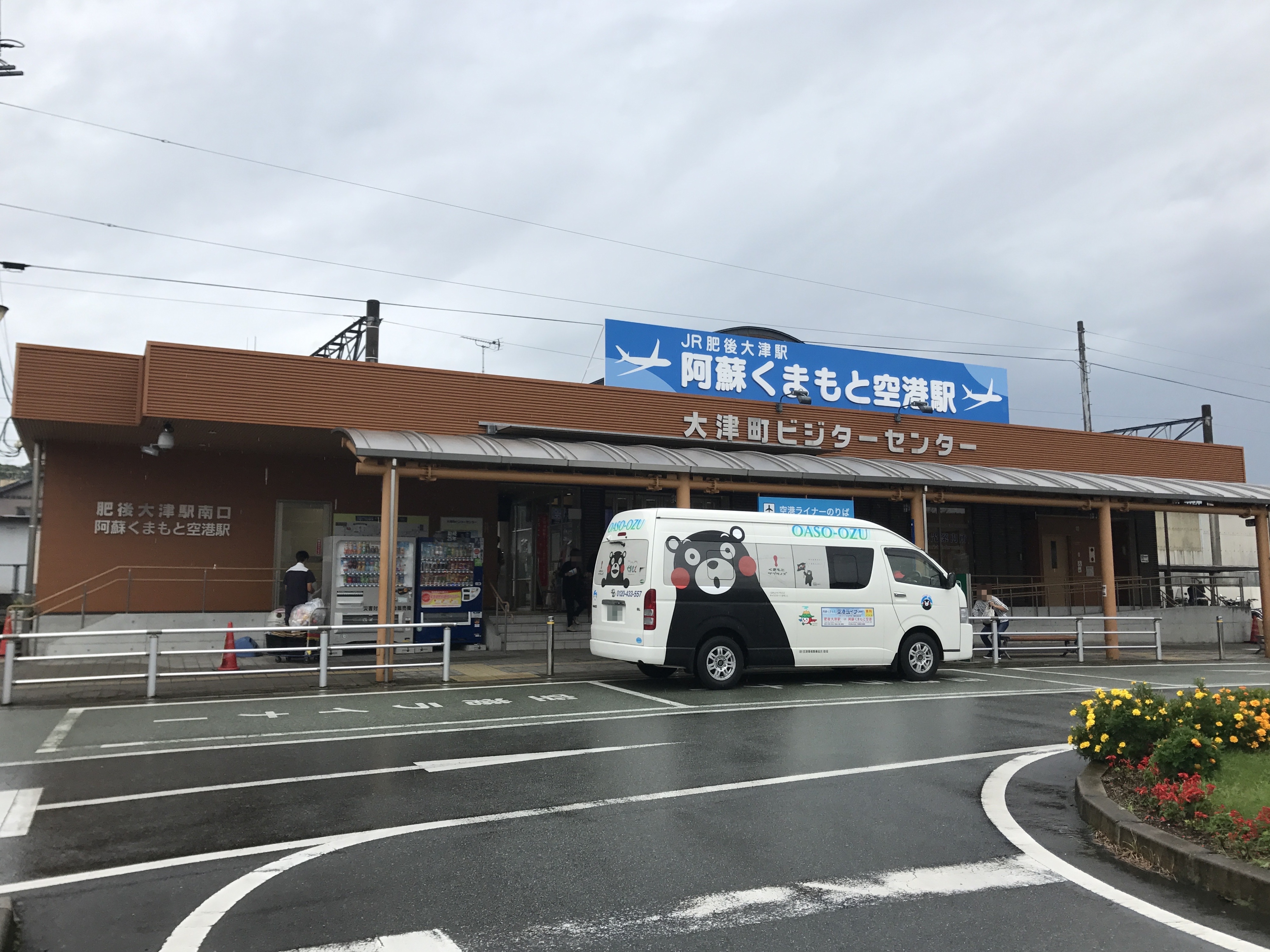
The south entrance of the station. The bus in front is the Kumamoto Airport Liner.

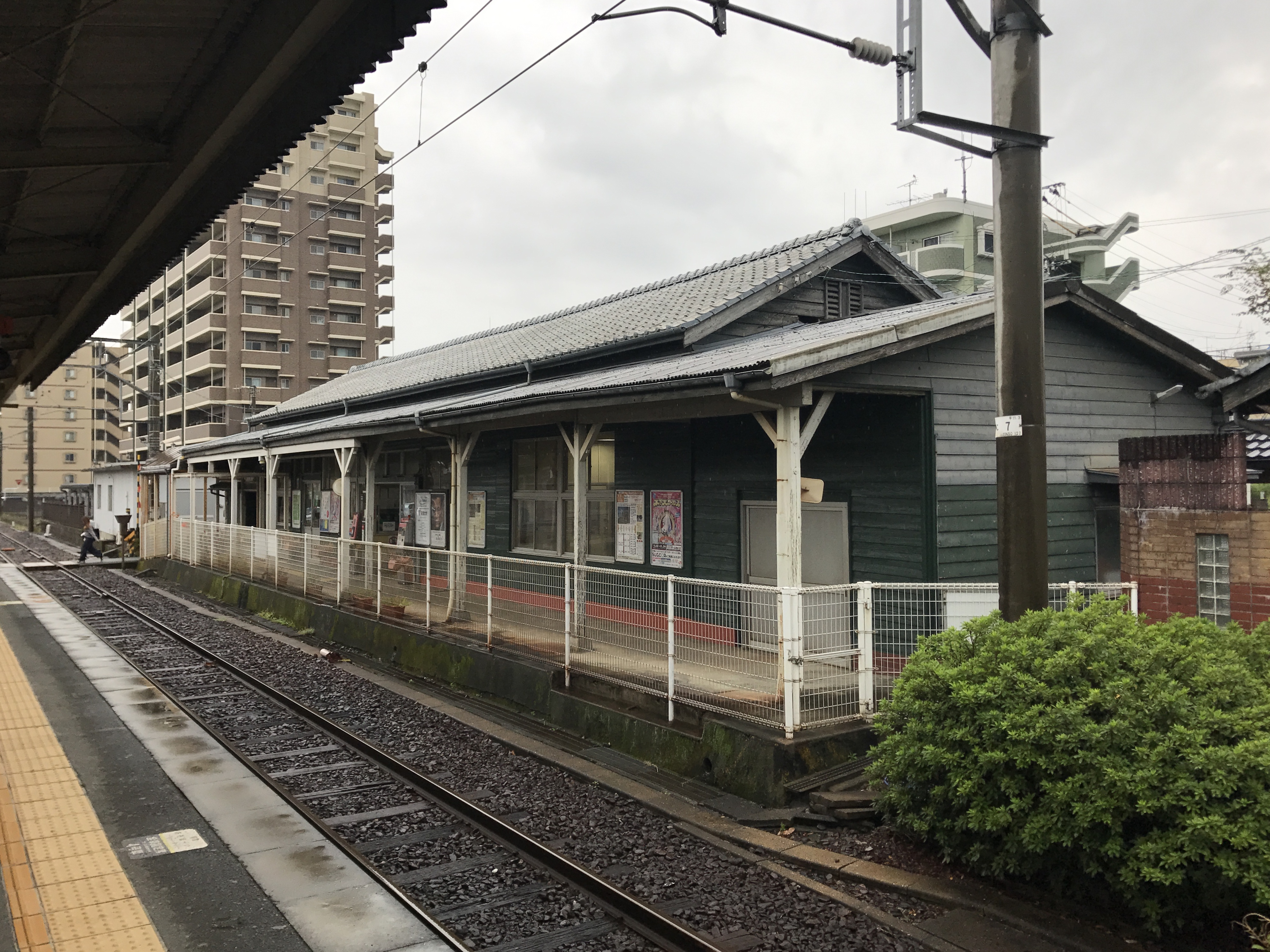
Rear of station building, with level crossing leading to Platform 1.

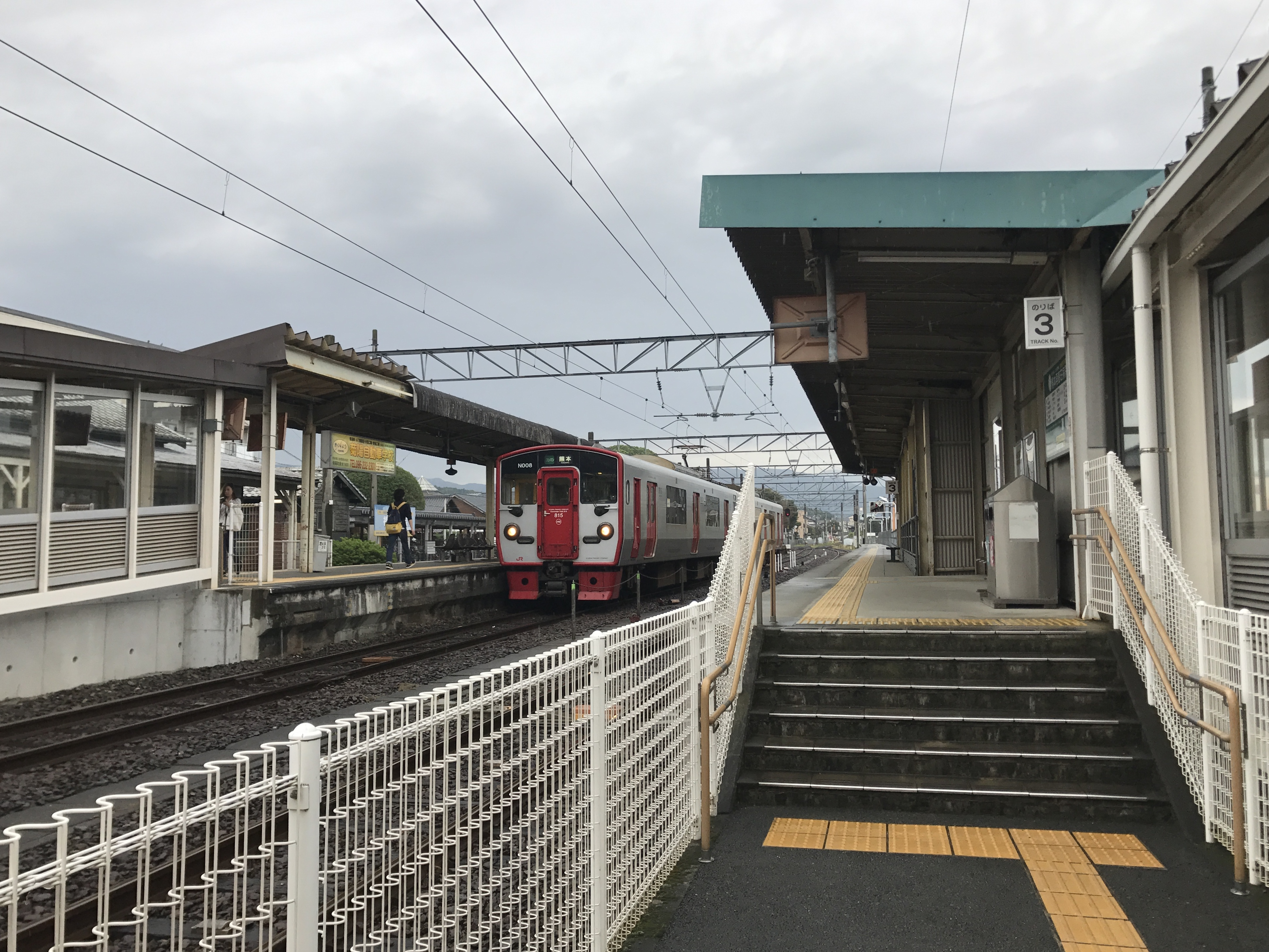
View from Platform 3, The island platform is to the left, with the station building beyond.

== History ==
Japanese Government Railways (JGR) opened the station on 21 June 1914 as the eastern terminus of the Miyagi Light Rail Line (宮地軽便線) (later the Miyagi Line) from Kumamoto. Higo-Ōzu became a through-station on 11 November 1916 when the track was extended to Tateno. By 1928, the track had been extended further eastward and had linked up with the Inukai Line (犬飼線) which had been built westward from Ōita. On 2 December 1928, the entire track from Kumamoto to Ōita was designated as the Hōhi Main Line. With the privatization of Japanese National Railways (JNR), the successor of JGR, on 1 April 1987, the station came under the control of JR Kyushu.

The track from Higo-Ōzu to Aso was heavily damaged in the 2016 Kumamoto earthquakes and as a result, service between the two stations was suspended. JR Kyushu commenced repairs on this section in April 2017, starting from Higo-Ōzu to Tateno; services resumed on the entire section on August 8, 2020.

On 4 March 2017, Higo-Ōzu was given the nickname "Aso Kumamoto Airport Station" as it is the nearest railway station to Kumamoto Airport.

== Passenger statistics ==
In fiscal 2020, the station was used by an average of 2049 passengers daily (boarding passengers only), and it ranked 68th among the busiest stations of JR Kyushu.

== Surrounding area ==
- Ōzu Town Hall

== See also ==
- List of railway stations in Japan
