= Kumamoto Station =

Railway and tram station in Kumamoto, Japan

Kumamoto Station 熊本駅
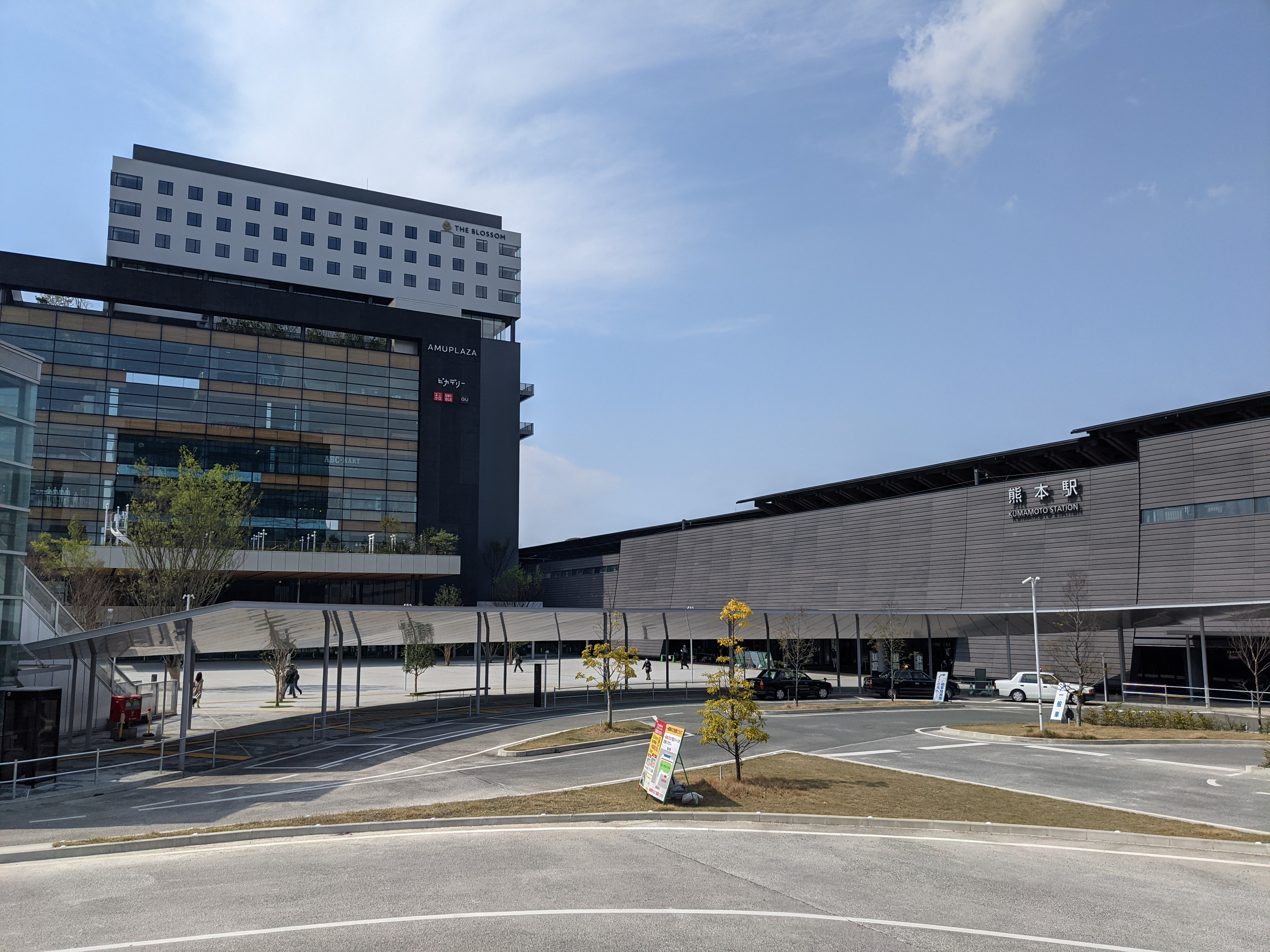
- Kumamoto Station in 2021

General information
- Location: 3-15-1 Kasuga, Nishi-ku, Kumamoto-shi, Kumamoto-ken; Japan
- Coordinates: 32°47′24″N 130°41′20″E
- Operator: JR Kyushu
- Lines: Kyūshū Shinkansen; Kagoshima Main Line; Hōhi Main Line
- Connections: Bus terminal

History
- Opened: 1 July 1891; 135 years ago

Passengers
- FY2020: 9,465
- Rank: 10th (among JR Kyushu stations)

Services
Preceding station	JR Kyushu	Following station
Sendai towards Kagoshima-Chūō	Kyūshū Shinkansen Mizuho	Kurume towards Hakata
Shin-Yatsushiro towards Kagoshima-Chūō	Kyūshū Shinkansen Sakura Tsubame	Shin-Tamana towards Hakata
Location
- Location within Kumamoto Prefecture Location within Japan

Kumamoto Station (熊本駅, Kumamoto-eki) is a junction passenger railway station located in the Nishi-ku ward of the city of Kumamoto, Kumamoto Prefecture, Japan. It is operated by JR Kyushu. It is the main terminal station for the city. In front of the station is a tram stop of the tram operated by Kumamoto City Transportation Bureau named Kumamoto-Ekimae Station.

== Lines ==
Kumamoto is an intermediate station of the Kyushu Shinkansen and is 118.4 kilometers from the starting point of the line at Hakata and 740.7 kilometers from Shin-Osaka. It is also an intermediate station for the Kagoshima Main Line, of which it is 196.6 kilometers from the starting point at Mojikō. The station is also the western terminus of the 148.0 kilometer Hōhi Main Line to Oita.

== JR limited express trains ==
- Trans-Kyushu Limited Express (Beppu - Hitoyoshi)
- Kumagawa (Kumamoto - Hitoyoshi)

== Platforms ==
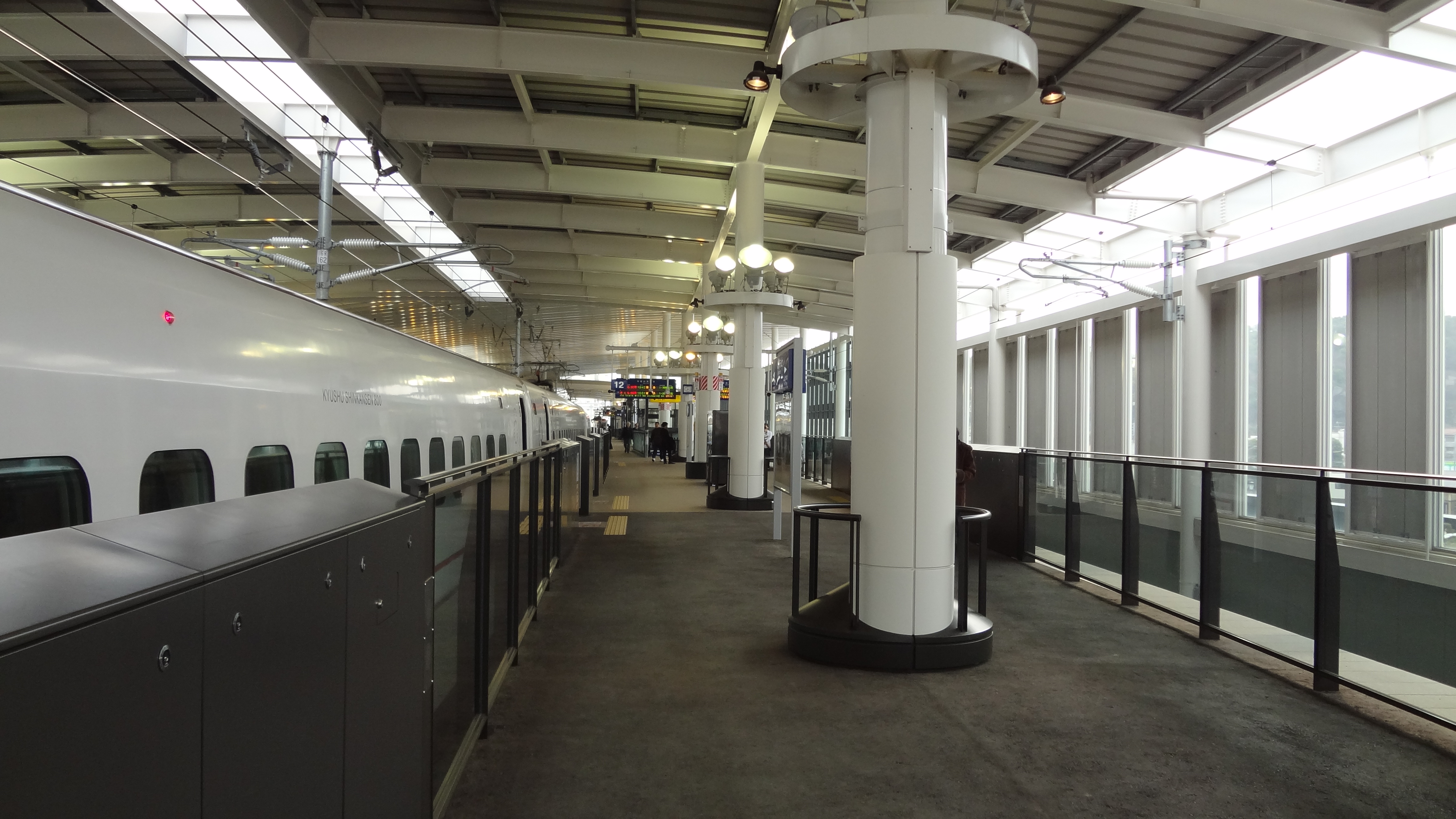
Shinkansen platforms

0A, 0B, 0C	■ Trans-Kyushu Limited Express	for Yatsushiro and Hitoyoshi
0A, 0B, 0C	■ Limited Express Kumagawa	for Yatsushiro and Hitoyoshi
0A, 0B, 0C	■ Hohi Main Line	for Suizenji, Musashizuka, Higo-Ōzu, and Miyaji
1	■ Kagoshima Main Line	for Yatsushiro
1	■ Misumi Line	for Misumi
2	■ Kagoshima Main Line	for Tamana, Arao and Ōmuta
2	■ Kagoshima Main Line	for Yatsushiro
2	■ Misumi Line	for Misumi
3	■ Limited Express Ariake	for Tamana, Arao, Ōmuta, Kurume, Tosu, and Hakata
3	■ Trans-Kyushu Limited Express	for Miyaji, Oita, and Beppu
3	■ Limited Express Kumagawa	for Yatsushiro and Hitoyoshi
3	■ Limited Express Aso Boy	for Aso and Miyaji
3	■ SL Hitoyoshi	for Yatsushiro and Hitoyoshi
3	■ Limited Express A-Train	for Misumi
3	■ Kagoshima Main Line	for Tamana, Arao and Ōmuta
■ Kagoshima Main Line	for Yatsushiro	
4	■ Hohi Main Line	for Suizenji, Musashizuka, Higo-Ōzu and Miyaji
4	■ Misumi Line	for Misumi
5	■ Kagoshima Main Line	for Tamana, Arao, Ōmuta, Ginsui, and Tosu
5	■ Kagoshima Main Line	for Yatsushiro
5	■ Hohi Main Line	for Suizenji, Musashizuka, Higo-Ōzu and Miyaji
11, 12	Kyushu Shinkansen	for Hakata and Shin-Ōsaka
13, 14	Kyushu Shinkansen	for Kagoshima-Chūō

=== Adjacent stations ===
←	Service	→
Kagoshima Main Line
Terminus	Rapid Super Orange	Yatsushiro
Kami-Kumamoto	Rapid Kumamoto Liner	Kawashiri
Kami-Kumamoto	Local	Nishi-Kumamoto
Hōhi Main Line
Terminus	Rapid Hōhi Liner	Shin-Suizenji
Terminus	Local	Heisei

== Passenger statistics ==
In fiscal 2020, the station was used by an average of 9,465 passengers daily (boarding passengers only), and it ranked 10th among the busiest stations of JR Kyushu.

== See also ==
- List of railway stations in Japan
