= Aso Station (Kumamoto) =

Railway station in Aso, Kumamoto Prefecture, Japan

Aso Station 阿蘇駅
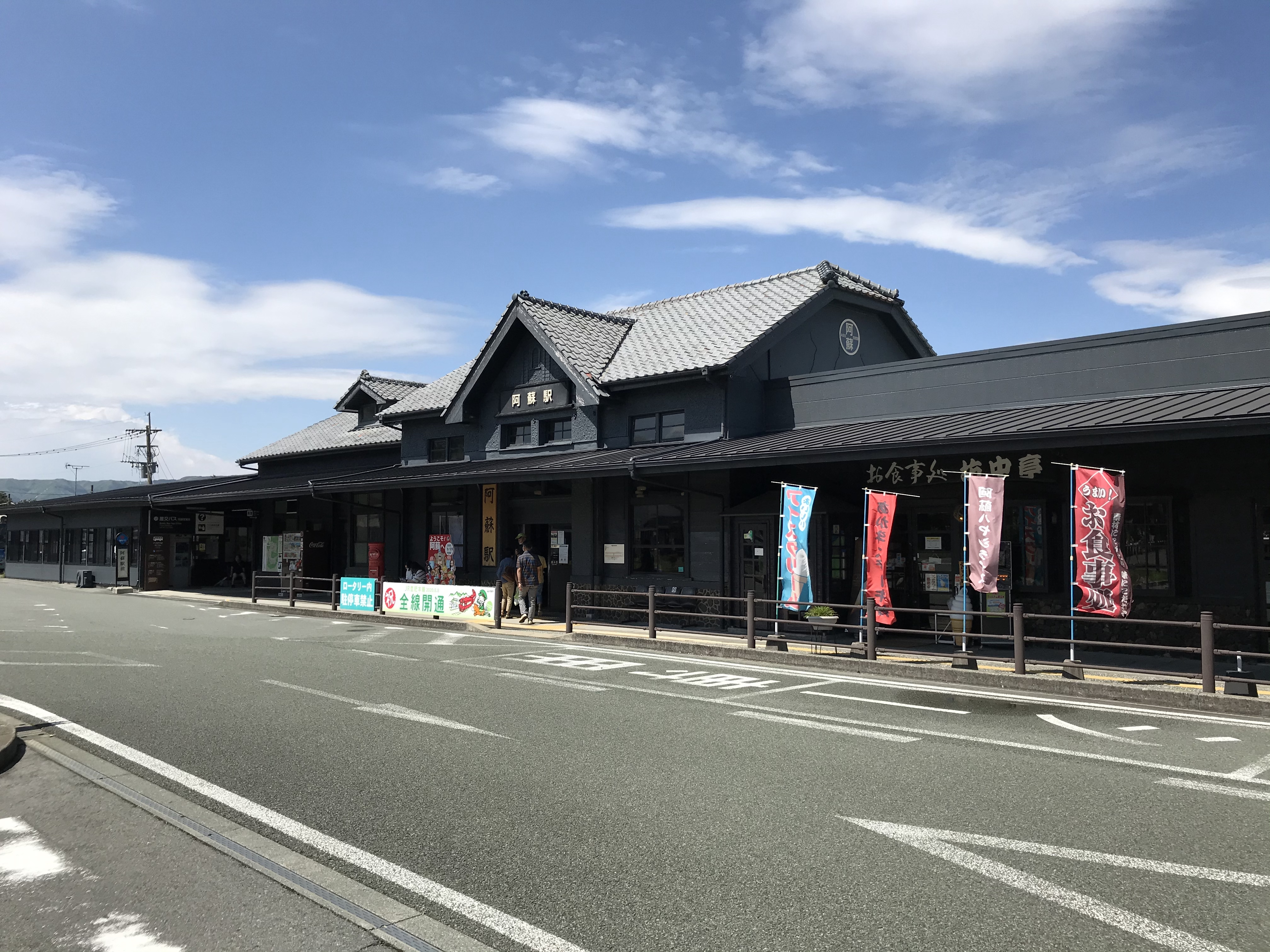
- Aso Station in September 2020

General information
- Location: Kurokawa, Aso-shi, Kumamoto-ken 869-2225; Japan
- Coordinates: 32°56′15″N 131°04′49″E
- Operator: JR Kyushu
- Line: ■ Hōhi Main Line
- Distance: 49.9 km from Kumamoto
- Platforms: 1 island platform
- Tracks: 2 + 1 siding

Construction
- Structure type: At grade

Other information
- Status: Staffed ticket window (outsourced)
- Website: Official website

History
- Opened: 25 January 1918
- Former names: Bōchū (until 20 March 1961)

Services
| Preceding station | JR Kyushu | Following station |
|---|---|---|
| Uchinomaki towards Kumamoto | Hōhi Main Line | Ikoi-no-Mura towards Ōita |
Location
- Location within Kumamoto Prefecture Location within Japan

Aso Station (阿蘇駅, Aso-eki) is a passenger railway station located in the city of Aso, Kumamoto, Japan. It Is operated by JR Kyushu.

== Lines ==
Aso Station is served by the 148.0 km (92.0 mi) Hōhi Main Line, which runs between Kumamoto and Ōita and is located 49.9 km from the starting point of the line at Kumamoto.

== Layout ==
The station consists of two side platforms serving two tracks at grade. The station building is a wooden structure of traditional Japanese design and houses a staffed ticket window, a waiting area, a shop and a restaurant.

Management of the station has been outsourced to the JR Kyushu Tetsudou Eigyou Co., a wholly owned subsidiary of JR Kyushu specialising in station services. It staffs the ticket window which is equipped with a POS machine but does not have a Midori no Madoguchi facility.

=== Platforms ===
| 1 | ■ ■ Hōhi Main Line | for Kumamoto |
| 2 | ■ ■ Hōhi Main Line | for Miyaji and Oita |

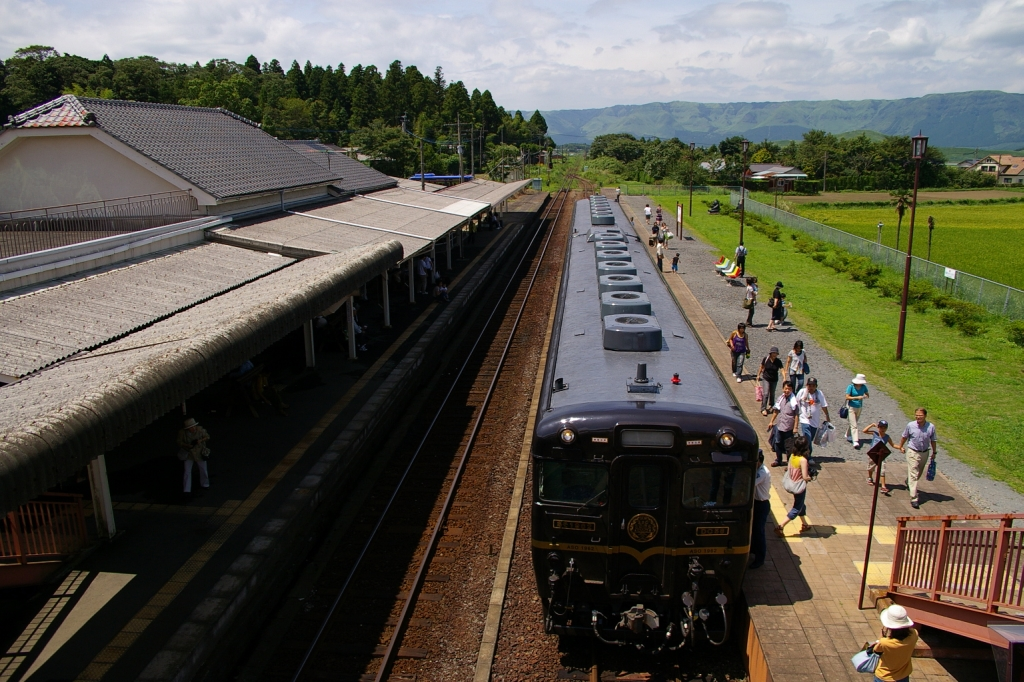
A view of the platforms and tracks.

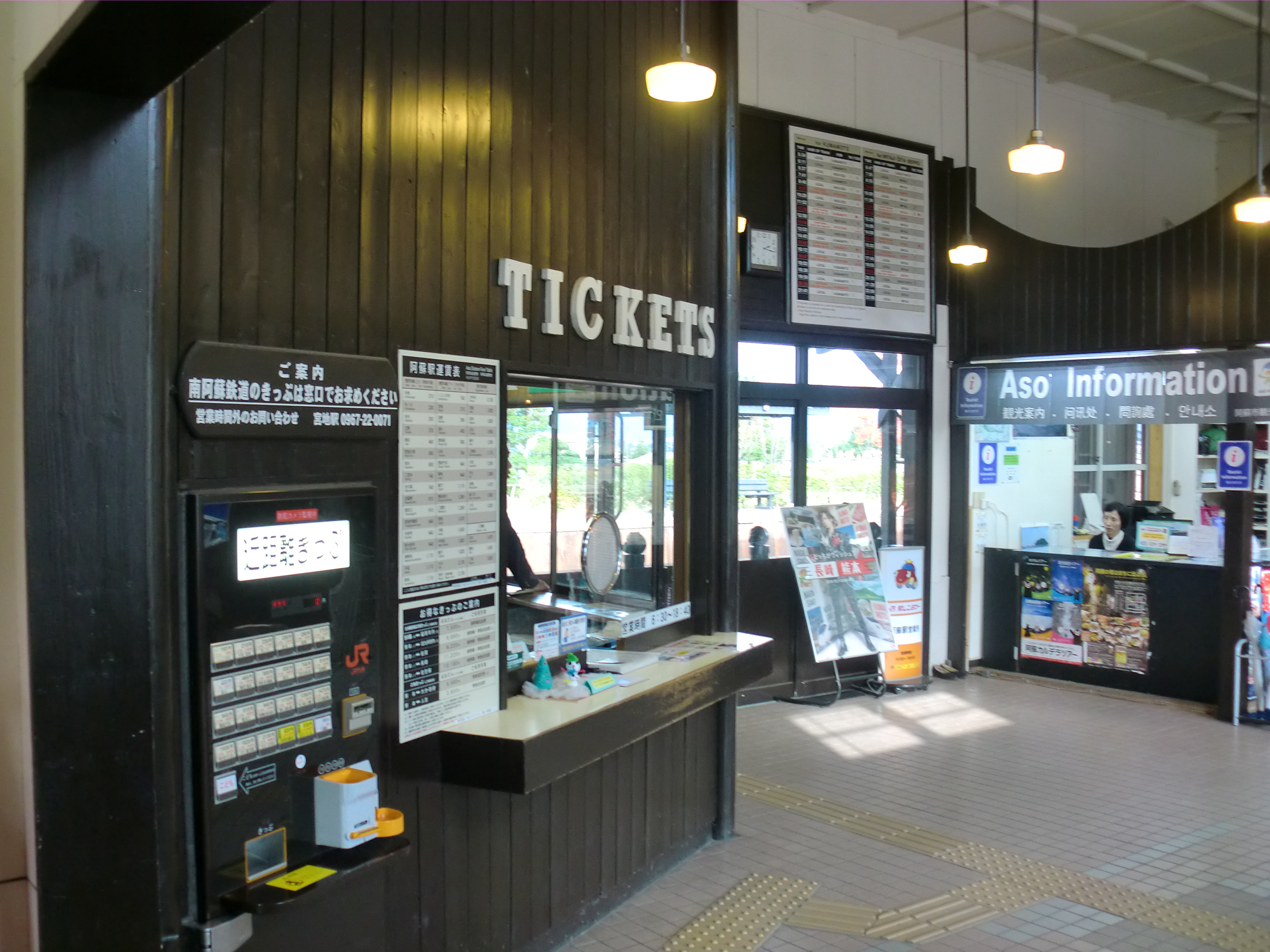
Ticket window

== History ==
On 21 June 1914, Japanese Government Railways (JGR) opened the Miyaji Light Rail Line (宮地軽便線) (later the Miyagi Line) from Kumamoto eastwards to Higo-Ōzu. The line was extended eastward in phases and Miyaji was established as the eastern terminal on 25 January 1918. On the same day, Aso was opened as an intermediate station on the new track with the name Bōchū Station (坊中駅). On 2 December 1928, Miyaji was linked up with Tamarai, the western terminus of the Inukai Line (犬飼線), which had been extended westwards in phases from Ōita since 1914. Through-traffic was established between Kumamoto and Ōita. The two lines were merged and the entire stretch redesignated as the Hōhi Main Line. Bōchū was renamed Aso Station on 20 March 1961. With the privatization of JNR on 1 April 1987, the station came under the control of JR Kyushu.

Because of track damage from the 2016 Kumamoto earthquakes, service between Higo-Ōzu to Bungo-Ogi was suspended from April 2016. Service between Aso and Bungo-Ogi was restored by 9 July 2016. The sector between Higo-Ōzu and Aso remained closed. JR Kyushu commenced the repair work, starting first with the track from Higo-Ōzu to Tateno. On 8 August 2020, JR Kyushu reopened the Higo-Ōzu to Aso section of the line, permitting access between Aso and Kumamoto.

On 17 September 2017, Typhoon Talim (Typhoon 18) damaged the Hōhi Main Line at several locations. Services between Aso and Nakahanda were suspended and replaced by bus services. Rail service from Aso to Miemachi was restored by 22 September 2017 Normal rail services between Aso and Ōita were restored by 2 October 2017.

== Surrounding area ==
- Sankō Bus Terminal
- Mount Aso: A 40-minute ride by bus
- Uchinomaki Onsen
- Japan National Route 57
- Japan National Route 212
- Aso Villa Park Hotel
- Michi no eki Aso

== See also ==
- List of railway stations in Japan
