= Aso Boy =

Limited express train service in Kyushu, Japan

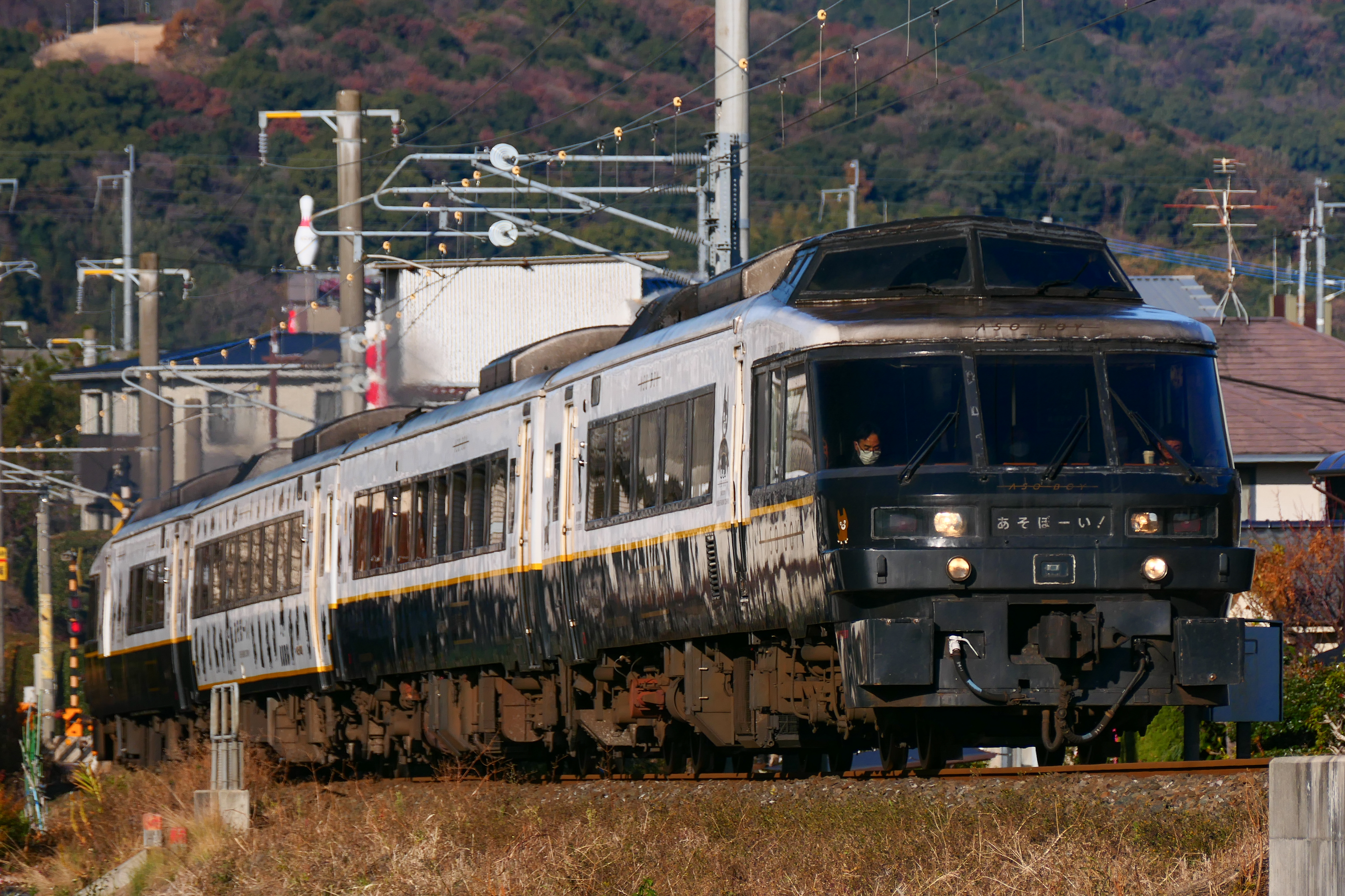
- KiHa 183-1000 Aso Boy, January 2023

Overview
- Service type: Limited express
- Locale: Kyushu
- First service: 2011
- Current operator(s): JR Kyushu

Route
- Termini: Kumamoto; Miyaji
- Service frequency: Two return trips daily

On-board services
- Class(es): Standard class only
- Catering facilities: Cafe counter

Technical
- Rolling stock: KiHa 183-1000 DMU
- Track gauge: 1,067 mm (3 ft 6 in)
- Electrification: None

The Aso Boy (あそぼーい！) is a limited express train service in Kyushu, Japan, operated by Kyushu Railway Company (JR Kyushu) since June 2011. The train normally runs between Kumamoto and Miyaji via Aso on the Hōhi Main Line.

== Service pattern and station stops ==
Services normally operate on weekends, Public holidays, and additional days, such as school holidays, with two return workings (Aso Boy 101, 102, 103, 104) per day. The 53 km (33 mi) journey between Kumamoto and Miyaji takes approximately 1 hour 30 minutes.

Services stop at the following stations.

Kumamoto - Shin-Suizenji - Suizenji - Higo-Ōzu - Tateno - Akamizu - Aso - Miyaji

On certain dates in October to December 2011, the Aso Boy 101 and 104 services were extended to run between Hakata and Kumamoto as part of a destination campaign targeting Kumamoto, Miyazaki, and Kagoshima.

== Rolling stock ==
The train is formed of specially modified 4-car KiHa 183-1000 diesel multiple unit set converted from the former Yufu DX trainset.

== Formation ==
The train is formed as follows, with car 1 at the Miyaji end, and car 4 at the Kumamoto end.

Car No.	1	2	3	4
Running No.	KiHa 183-1001	KiHa 182-1001	KiHa 182-1002	KiHa 183-1002
Seating capacity	37	44	9	37
Facilities	Toilet	Semi-open compartments, 4-seat bays	"Family car" with children's play area, "Kurocafe" counter	Toilet

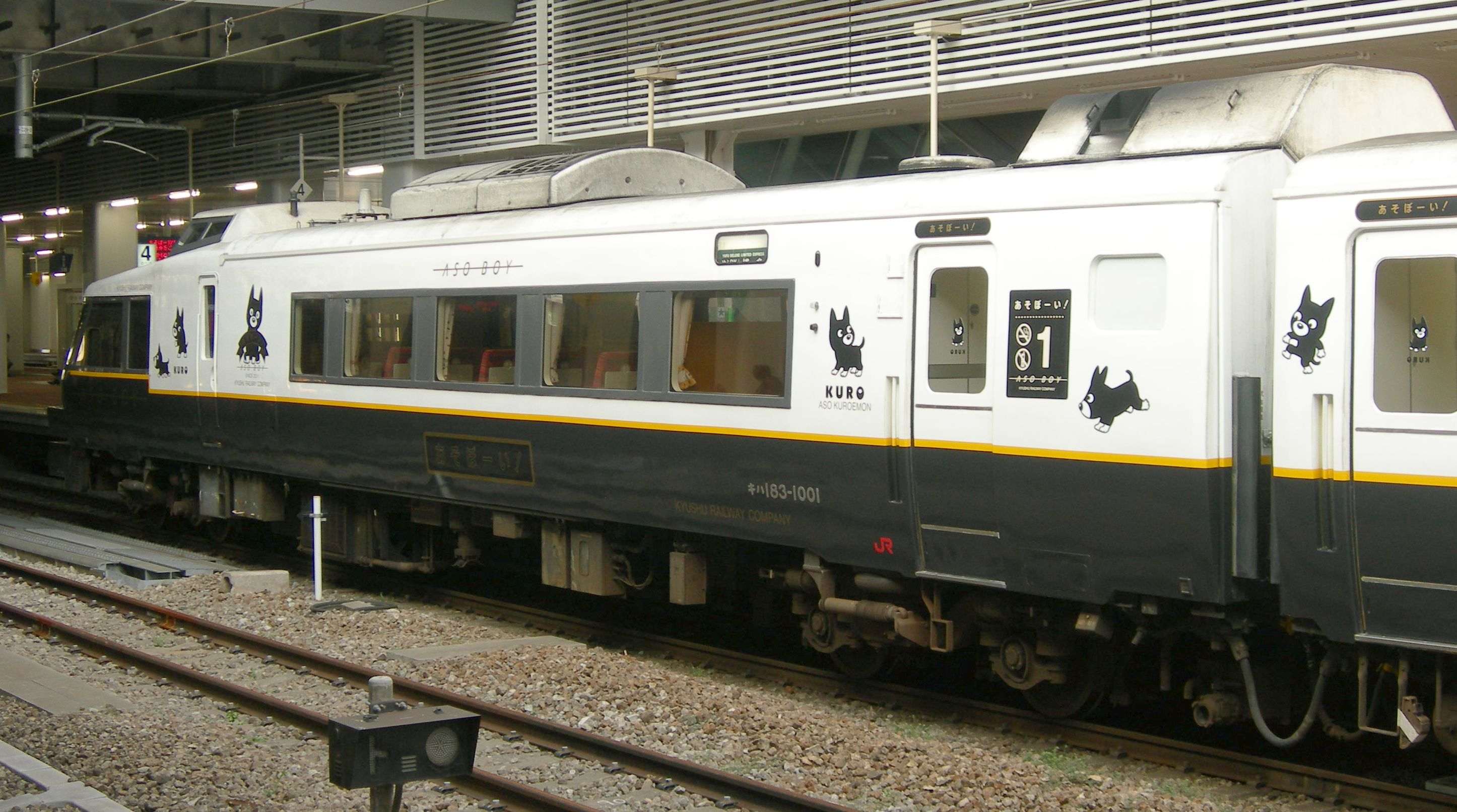
Car 1 (KiHa 183-1001)

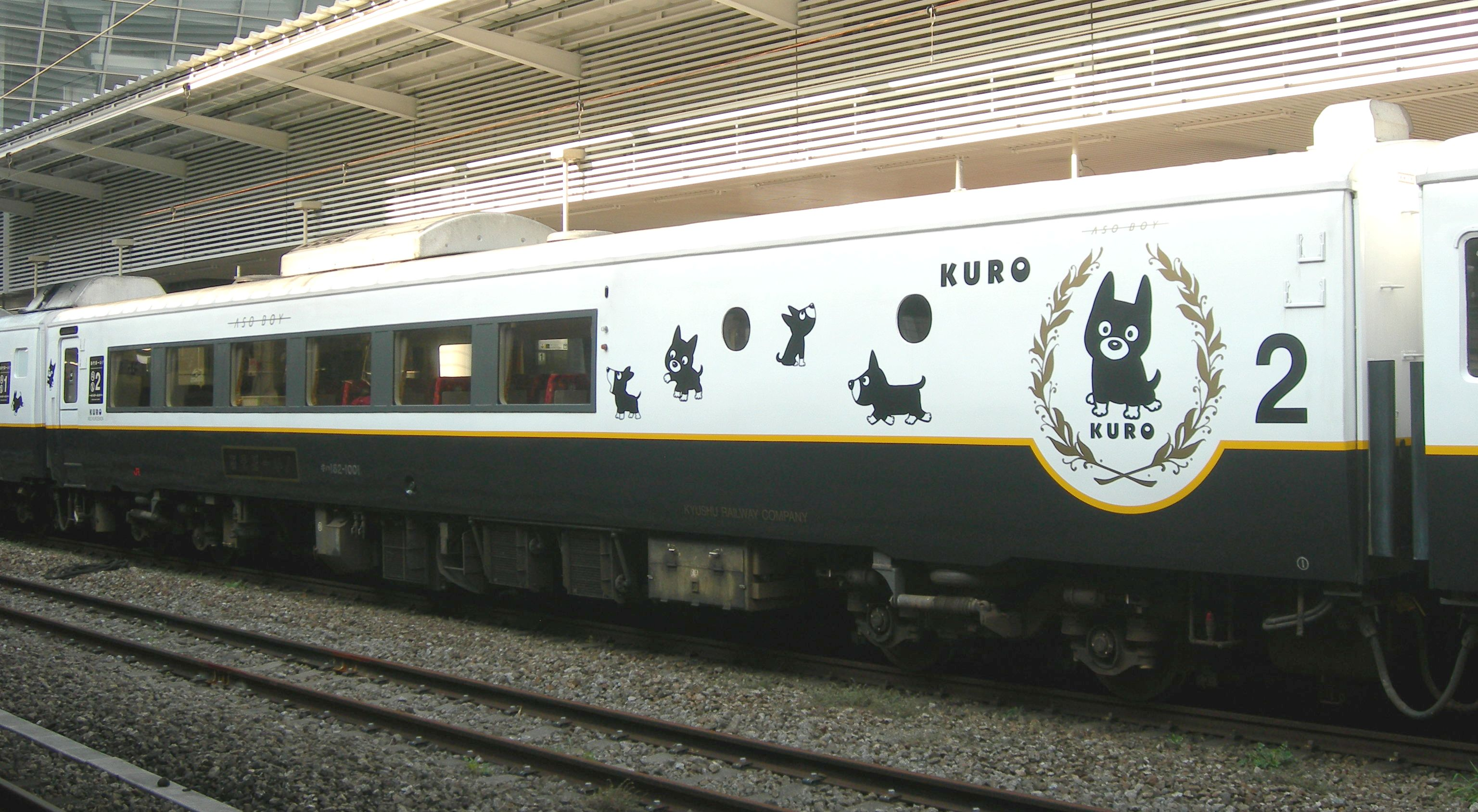
Car 2 (KiHa 182-1001)

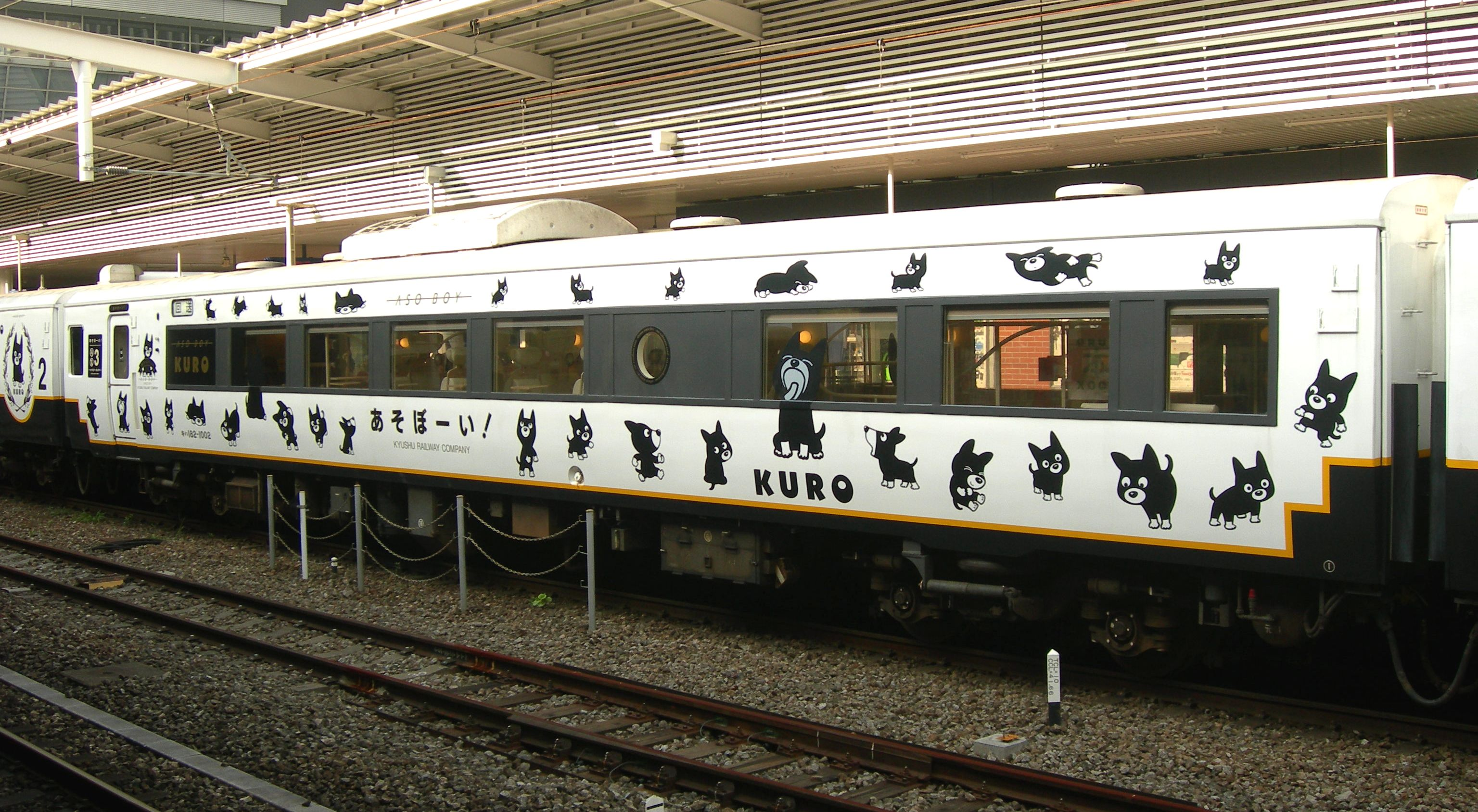
Car 3 (KiHa 182-1002)

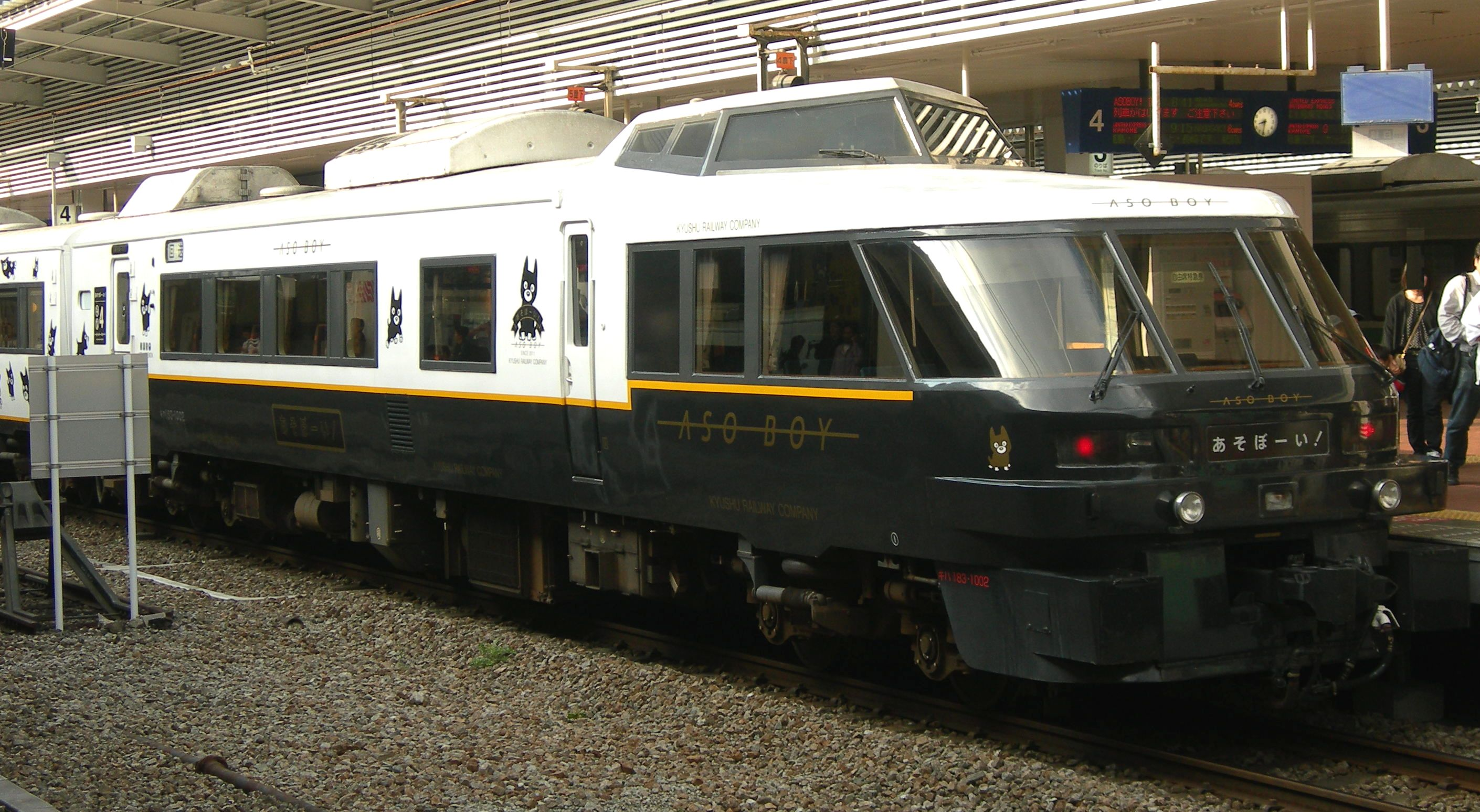
Car 4 (KiHa 183-1002)

== Interior ==
All cars are no-smoking.

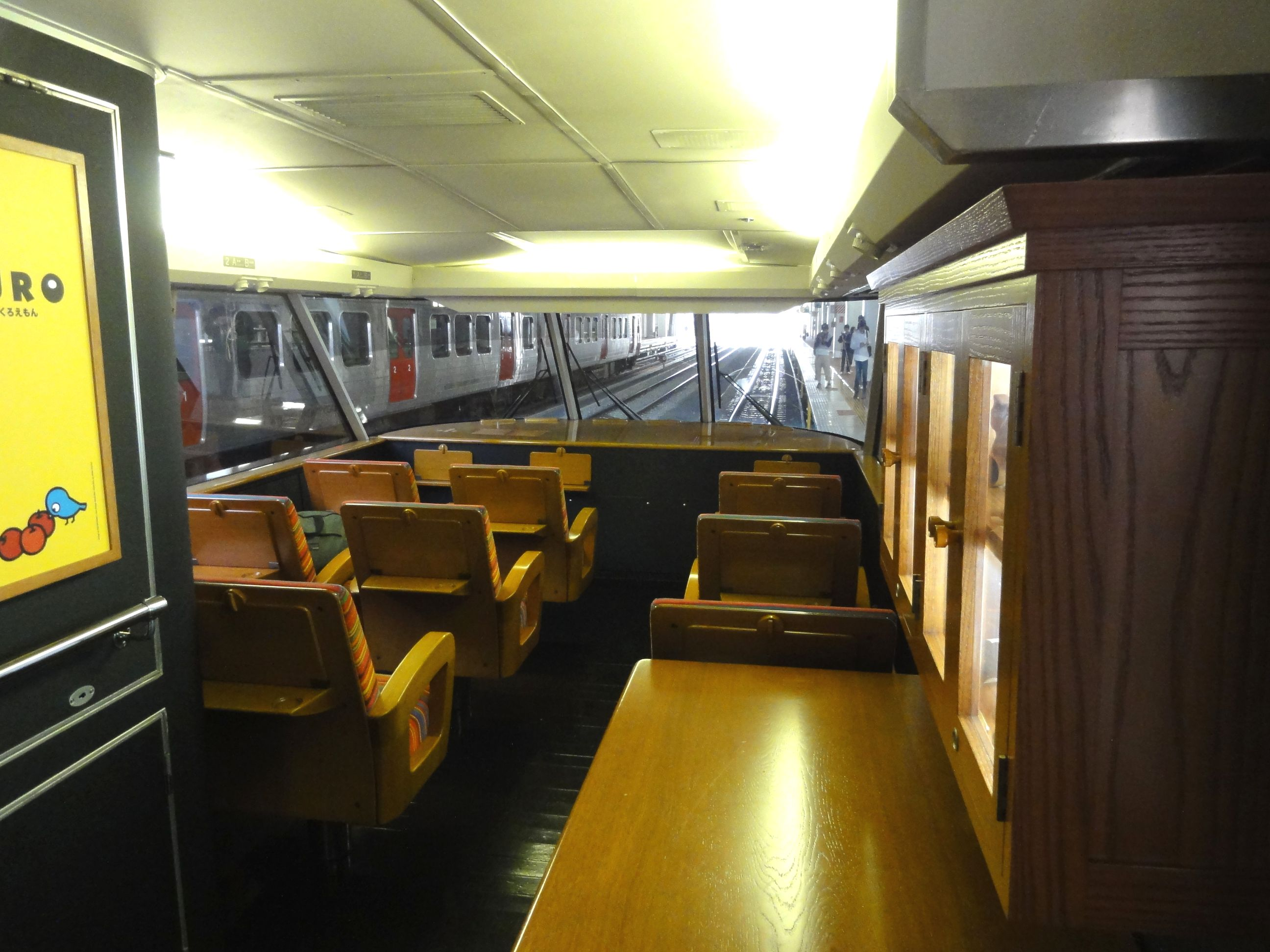
Panorama seating in car 1 (KiHa 183-1001)

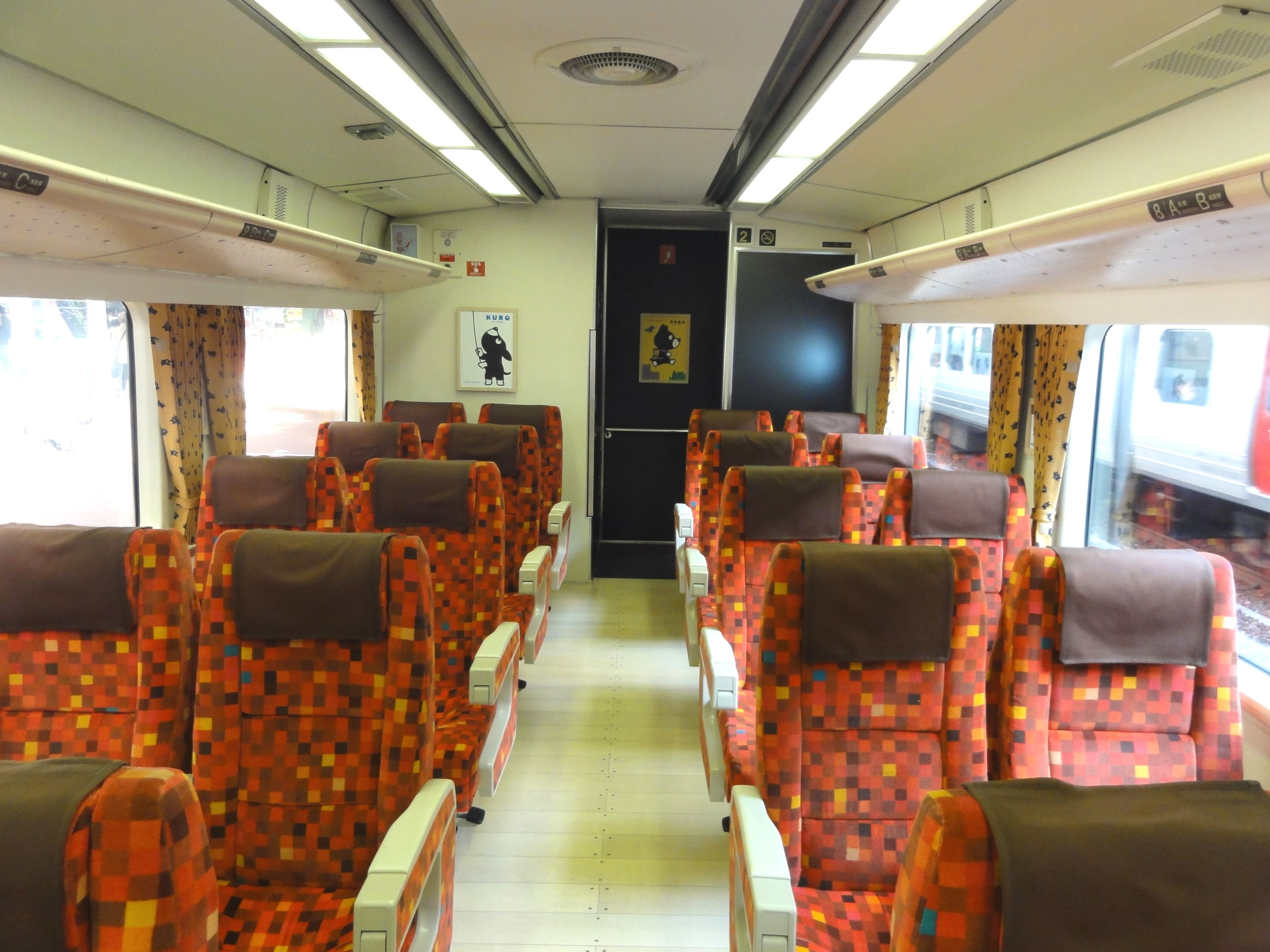
Unidirectional seating in car 2 (KiHa 182-1001)

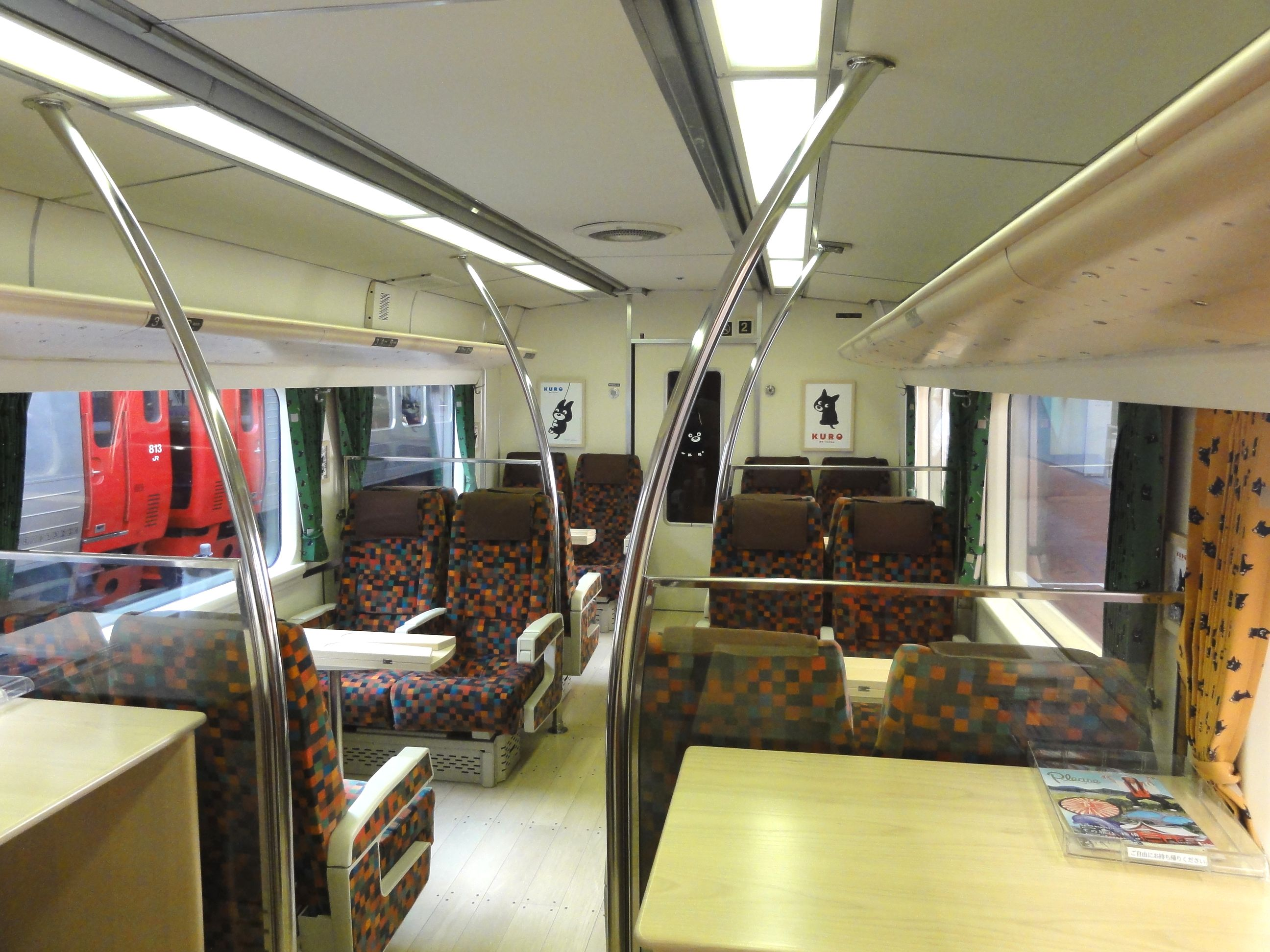
4-seat bay seating in car 2 (KiHa 182-1001)

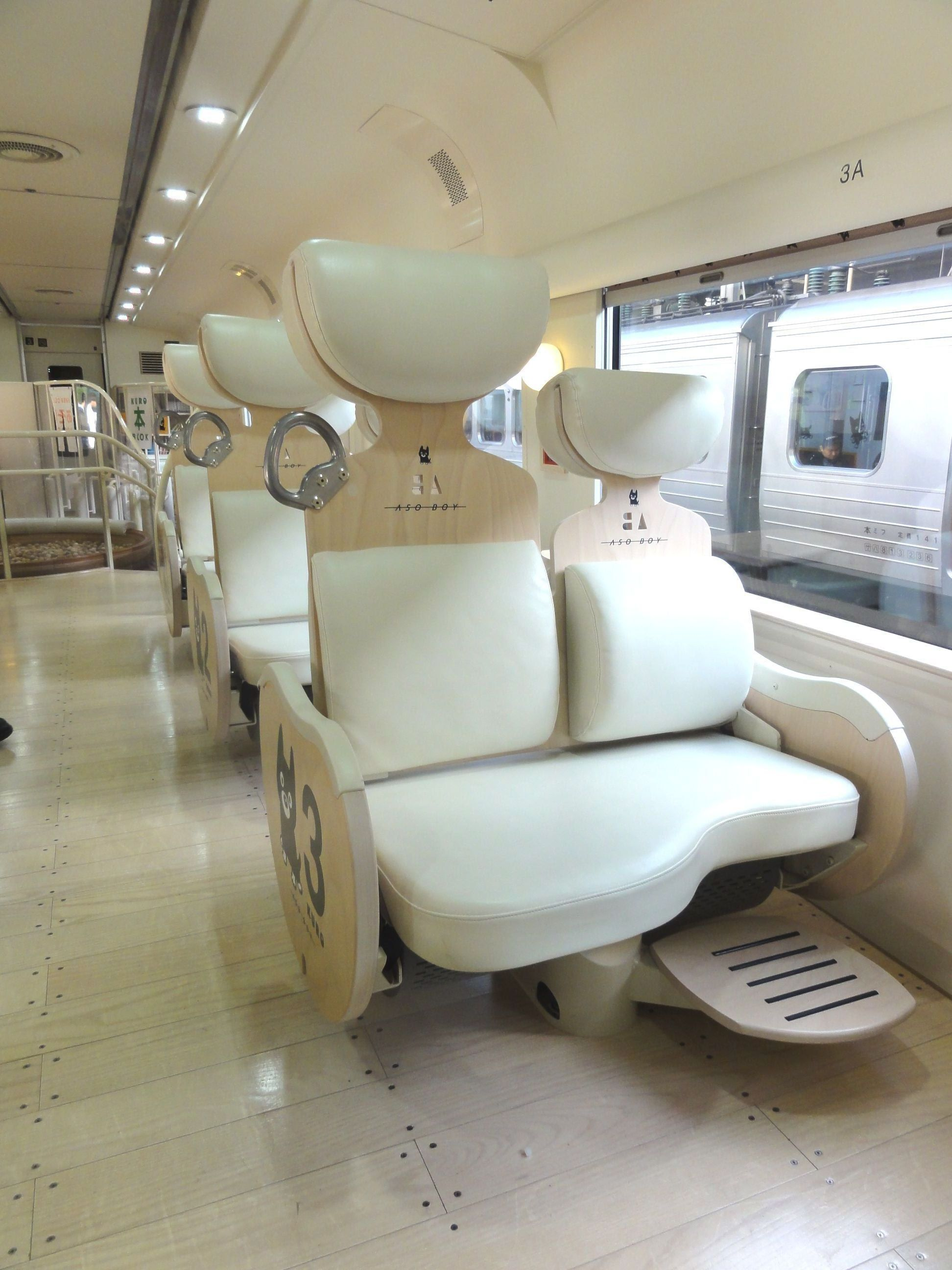
"Kurochan" family seating in car 3 (KiHa 183-1002)

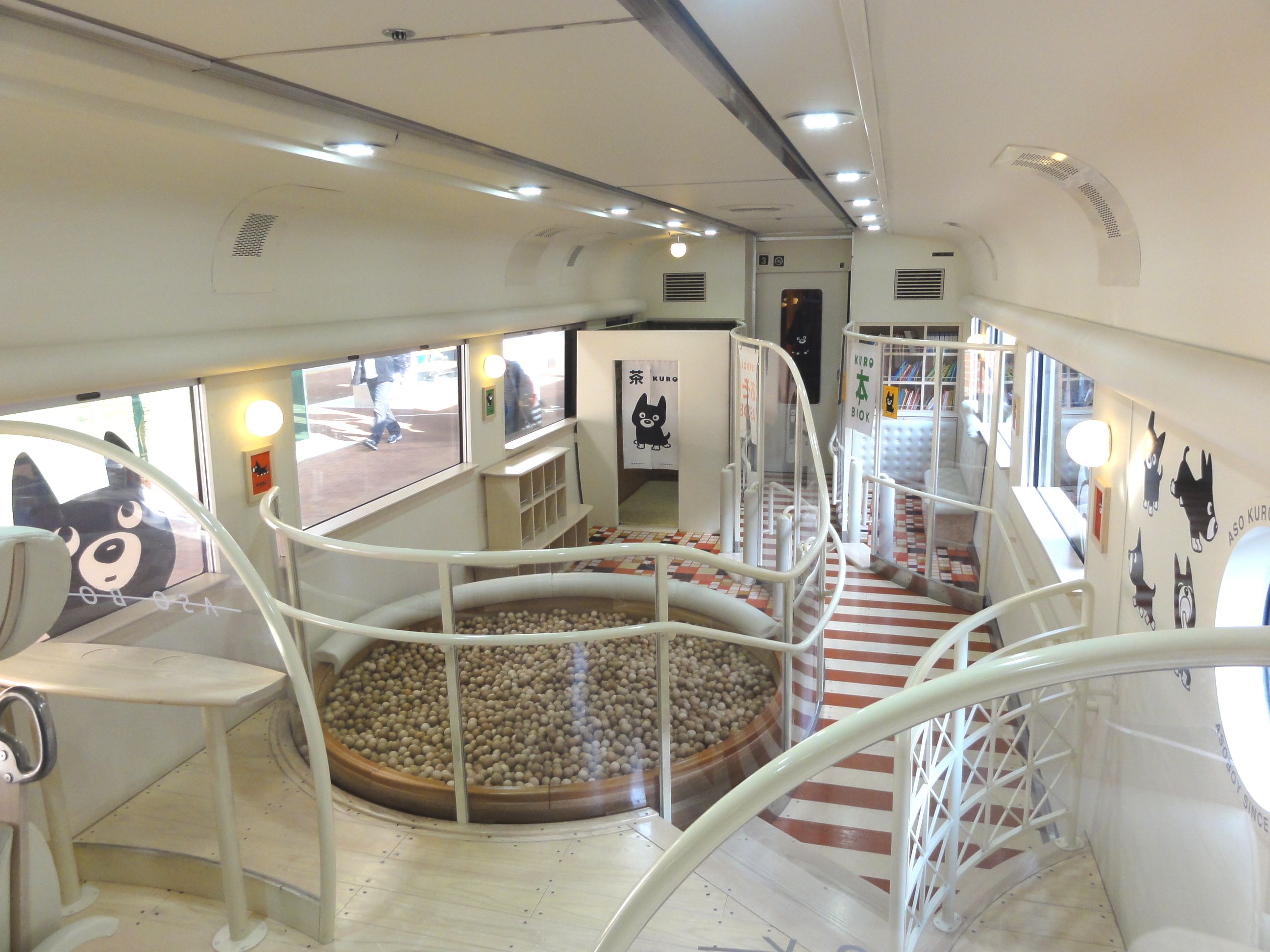
"Kuroclub" family area in car 3 (KiHa 183-1002)

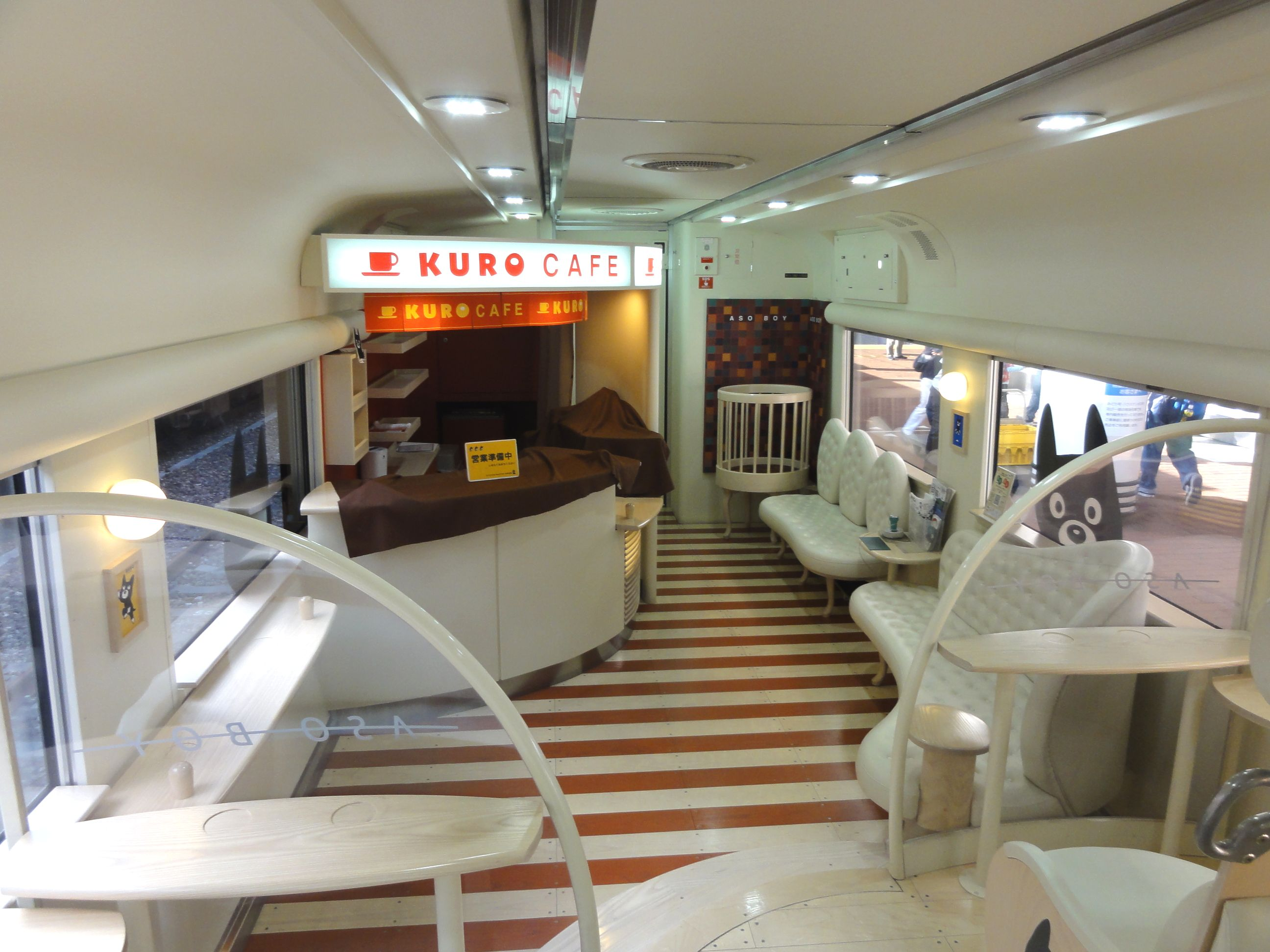
"Kurocafe" area in car 3 (KiHa 183-1002)

== History ==
The Aso Boy service was introduced on 4 June 2011.

== See also ==
- Joyful Train
