= Tōkai-Gakuen-mae Station =

Railway station in Kumamoto, Japan

Tōkai-Gakuen-mae Station 東海学園前駅
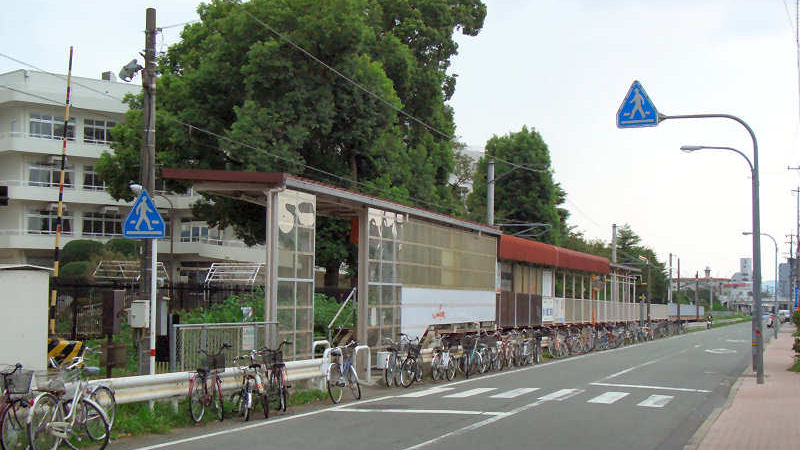
- Tōkai-Gakuen-mae Station in 2006

General information
- Location: 9-chōme-1 Toroku, Higashi-ku, Kumamoto-shi, Kumamoto-ken, 862-0970; Japan
- Coordinates: 32°48′42″N 130°44′34″E
- Operator: JR Kyushu
- Line: ■ Hōhi Main Line
- Distance: 7.8 km from Kumamoto
- Platforms: 1 side platform
- Tracks: 1

Construction
- Structure type: At grade

Other information
- Status: Staffed ticket window (outsourced)
- Website: Official website

History
- Opened: 1 November 1986; 39 years ago

Passengers
- FY2020: 1212 daily
- Rank: 121st (among JR Kyushu stations)

Services
Preceding station	JR Kyushu	Following station
Suizenji towards Kumamoto	Hōhi Main Line	Tatsutaguchi towards Ōita
Location
- Location within Kumamoto Prefecture Location within Japan

Tōkai-Gakuen-mae Station (東海学園前駅, Tōkai-Gakuen-mae-eki) is a passenger railway station located in the Higashi-ku ward of the city of Kumamoto, Kumamoto Prefecture, Japan. It is operated by JR Kyushu.

== Lines ==
The station is served by the Hōhi Main Line and is located 7.8 km from the starting point of the line at Kumamoto.

== Layout ==
The station consists of a side platform serving a single track at grade. There is no station building only a shelter on the platform. A staffed ticket booth is located on the other side of the track, within the premises of the Tokai University Kumamoto campus. From there, a level crossing is used to access the platform.

Management of the station has been outsourced to the JR Kyushu Tetsudou Eigyou Co., a wholly owned subsidiary of JR Kyushu specialising in station services. It staffs the ticket booth which is equipped with a POS machine but does not have a Midori no Madoguchi facility.

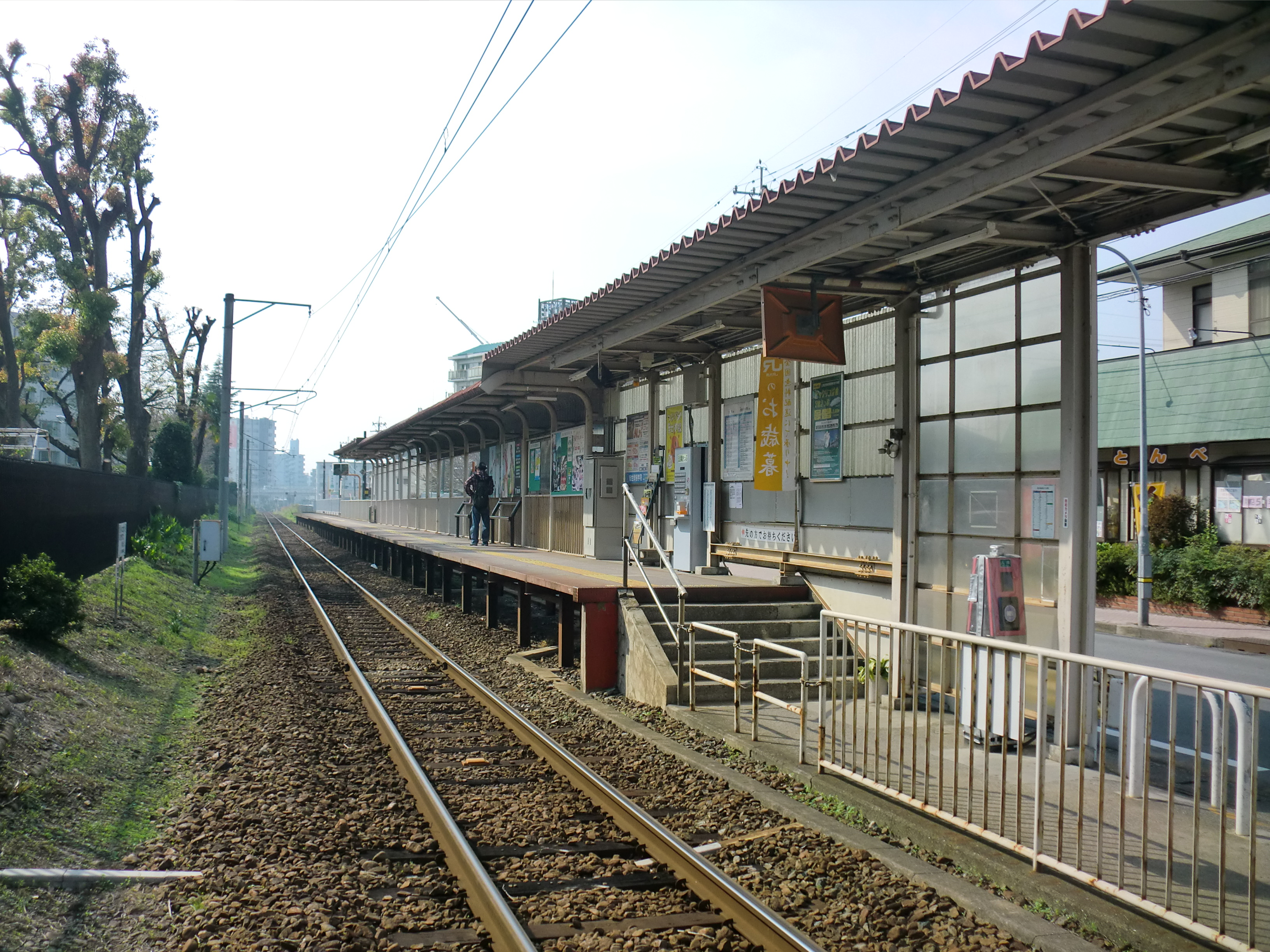
A view of the platform

== History ==
Japanese National Railways (JNR) opened the station on 1 November 1986 as an addition station on the existing track of the Hōhi Main Line. With the privatization of JNR on 1 April 1987, Takio came under the control of JR Kyushu.

== Passenger statistics ==
In fiscal 2020, the station was used by an average of 1212 passengers daily (boarding passengers only), and it ranked 121st among the busiest stations of JR Kyushu.

== Surrounding area ==
- Tokai University Kumamoto Campus
- Tokai University Kumamoto Seisho High School
- Kumamoto Prison

== See also ==
- List of railway stations in Japan
