= KiHa 183 series =

Japanese diesel multiple unit train type

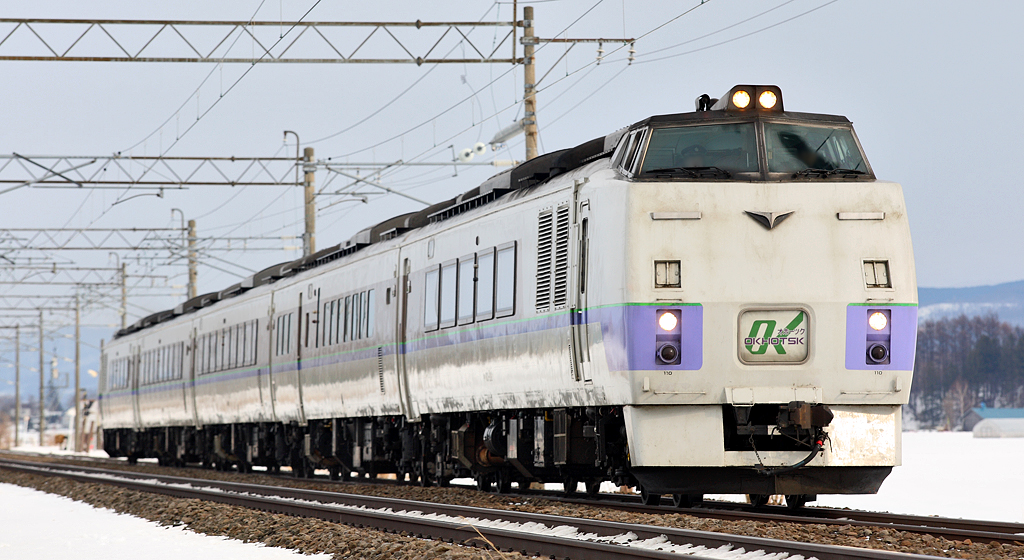
- KiHa 183 series in 2009
- Stock type: Diesel multiple unit
- In service: 1980–present
- Manufacturers: Fuji Heavy Industries; Niigata Tekko
- Replaced: KiHa 80 series
- Constructed: 1979–1992
- Entered service: February 10, 1980
- Number preserved: 2
- Successor: KiHa 261 series, KiHa 283 series
- Operators: JNR (1980–1987); JR Hokkaido (1987–2023); JR Kyushu (1988–present); Myanmar Railways (2009–2012); State Railway of Thailand (2021–present); Matadi–Kinshasa Railway (2023–present); Sierra Leonean Railways (2023–present); Cambodian Railways (2024–present)

Specifications
- Car length: 21,300 mm (69 ft 11 in)
- Width: 2,903 mm (9 ft 6 in)
- Maximum speed: 130 km/h (81 mph)
- Prime mover: DMF15HSA・DML30HSI
- Engine type: Diesel
- Track gauge: 1,067 mm (3 ft 6 in) (Japan, Sierra Leone, DR Congo); 1,000 mm (3 ft 3 3/8 in) metre gauge (Myanmar, Thailand, Cambodia)

The KiHa 183 series (キハ183系) is a diesel multiple unit that has been operated on express services since 1980 under Japan National Railways and later under JR Hokkaido and JR Kyushu. Some variants were eventually built, including resort trains (the KiHa 183-5000 Niseko Express, the KiHa 183-5100 Crystal Express Tomamu & Sahoro, and the KiHa 183-5200 North Rainbow Express).

The "KiHa" designation derives from the classification system used by JNR. "Ki" indicates a diesel-powered vehicle, while "Ha" indicates an ordinary passenger car, as opposed to a green car.

The sets remaining in service in Hokkaido were withdrawn after JR Hokkaido's March 18, 2023 timetable revision. Three cars (two KiHa 183-200 cars and one KiHa 183-5000 Niseko Express car) had their restoration crowdfunded and are stored in locations around Hokkaido. 17 cars were donated to the State Railway of Thailand, a further 19 cars were donated to Myanmar Railways for use on the Mandalay-Nay Pyi Taw route and services using these cars ran from 2009 until 2012, when they were withdrawn. Several units were exported to Cambodia, the Democratic Republic of the Congo and Sierra Leone after withdrawal. The remaining cars were scrapped.

== History ==
After finishing development in 1979, the 183 series went through a year and a half of testing, before entering service in 1981.

In 1986, the 500/1500 variant was introduced, replacing the KiHa 80 series trains completely; in 1988, new owner JR Hokkaido would introduce the 550/1550 variant, which was used on limited express services.

In 2008, 19 KiHa 183 diesel cars were transferred to Myanmar Railways for donation which they are supposed to be scrapped but instead, JR Kyushu managed to recondition these units for shipment to overseas for commercial use in Yangon, Myanmar. Operations started in 2009 on the Mandalay-Nay Pyi Taw route and ran until 2012, when Myanmar Railways discontinued the use of the KiHa 183 series.

In September 2021, it was announced that 17 cars would be donated by JR Hokkaido to the State Railway of Thailand, with them bearing the shipping costs.

In July 2022, JR Hokkaido announced plans to withdraw the KiHa 183 series from Okhotsk and Taisetsu limited-express services on the Sekihoku Main Line during the fiscal year; these services are expected to be taken over by newer KiHa 283 series trains. On 16 December 2022, JR Hokkaido finalized the date of withdrawal of the KiHa 183 series, announcing that they would be withdrawn ahead of JR Hokkaido's March 18 2023 timetable revision.

In 2023, seven former JR Hokkaido cars were exported to the Democratic Republic of the Congo, where they are to be operated on the Matadi–Kinshasa Railway.

Most recently, several units of KiHa 183 DMUs exported to Cambodia and Sierra Leone respectively.

== Manufactured cars ==
=== Prototype cars (183-900 series) ===
In 1979, 12 prototype cars were manufactured, which were numbered the -900 series. They were intended to be in sets made up of 7 cars, which could be extended to 10 cars for long-distance services. All cars were eventually modified to be included in production sets; they were eventually scrapped by 2001 due to age.

Classification	Car nos.	No. built	Notes	Ref.
KiHa 183-900	1–4	4	An ordinary car with a cab and a capacity of 40 passengers. One engine was installed, along with a power generator.	
KiHa 182-900	1–6	6	An intermediate passenger car with a capacity of 68 passengers, equipped with a bathroom.	
KiHa 184-900	1	1	An intermediary power car equipped with one engine, an equipment room and a power generator. One car was integrated and remodeled into the KiRo 184-901 green car in 1985.	
KiRo 182-900	1	1	A green car equipped with a washroom and toilet. It was scrapped in 2001.	

=== Initial production sets (183-0 series) ===
183-0 series
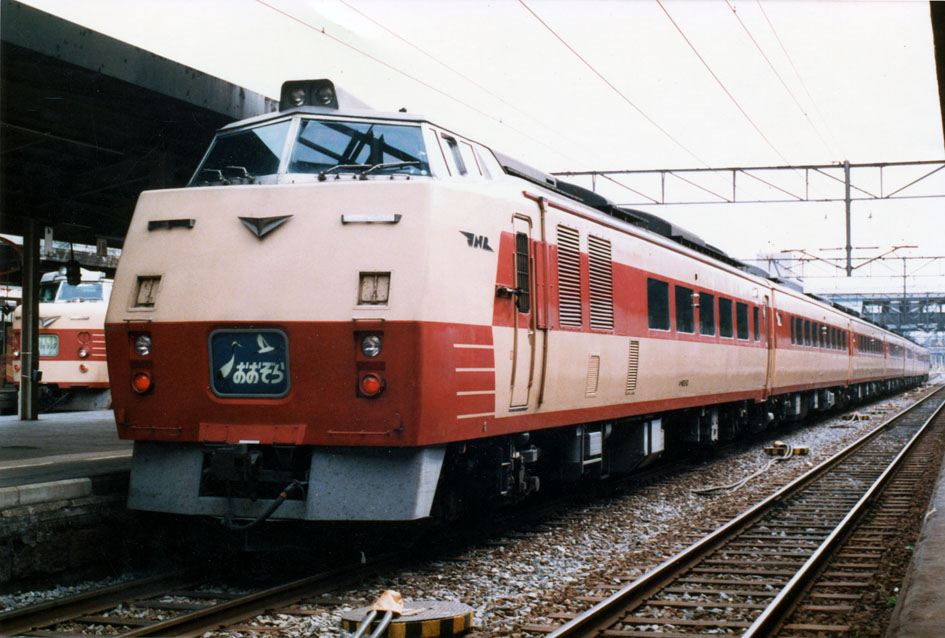
- 183-0 series train on Ōzora service in Sapporo, 1986
- Constructed: 1981–1983
- Entered service: 1981
- Scrapped: 2002–2018
- Number built: 89 cars
- Number scrapped: 89 cars
- Capacity: 40 (KiHa 183-0); 68 (KiHa 182-0); 44 (KiHa 184-0); 32 (KiRo 184-0)

Specifications
- Maximum speed: 100 km/h (62 mph) (early); 110 km/h (68 mph) (later)

The initial production sets were manufactured between 1981 and 1983, resulting in 89 cars, which were divided into 4 types. With the introduction of successor vehicles such as the KiHa 283 series and KiHa 261-1000 series, all vehicles were scrapped by 2018.

Classification	Car nos.	No. built	Notes	Ref.
KiHa 183-0	1–20	20	Unlike the 183-900 front cars, the windows could not be opened and the front decorative band was changed to stainless steel. Two cars were placed on the Asahiyama Zoo service, and cars 11–15 were refurbished into KiHa 183-200 series front cars in 1992, with an improved engine and transmission. 17 cars were donated to Thailand.	
KiHa 182-0	1–48	48	The side ventilation openings are enlarged compared to the KiHa 182-900 cars. Three cars were remodeled for Asahiyama Zoo services. Some were upgraded with a larger engine and a new transmission to become the KiHa 182-200.	
KiHa 184-0	1–11	11	The passenger capacity was increased to 52 by omitting the bathroom and water tank provided at the rear end. The layout of the side aisles, compared to the KiHa 182-900 cars, had been changed to eliminate the door between the deck and the equipment room. In 1985, four cars were remodeled to KiHa 183-100 series front cars by installing a driver's cab with the same capacity as the original cars. Of those cars, two (183-101 and 183-102) were scrapped in 2008, one (183-103) was transferred to Myanmar Railways in 2009 and the State Railway of Thailand acquired the 183-104 car in 2016.	
KiRo 182-0	1–10	10	Food services were expanded in this car, which included shops and kitchen-type facilities. The cabin door at the front end of the 900 series (prototype car) was relocated closer to the center of the car body, and the passenger capacity was reduced to 32 people. In 1996, 5 cars were remodeled to KiRoHa 182 cars, and by 2001, 4 cars were scrapped.	

=== Later models ===
==== 183-500 & 183-1500 series ====
183-500 & 183-1500 series (N183 series)
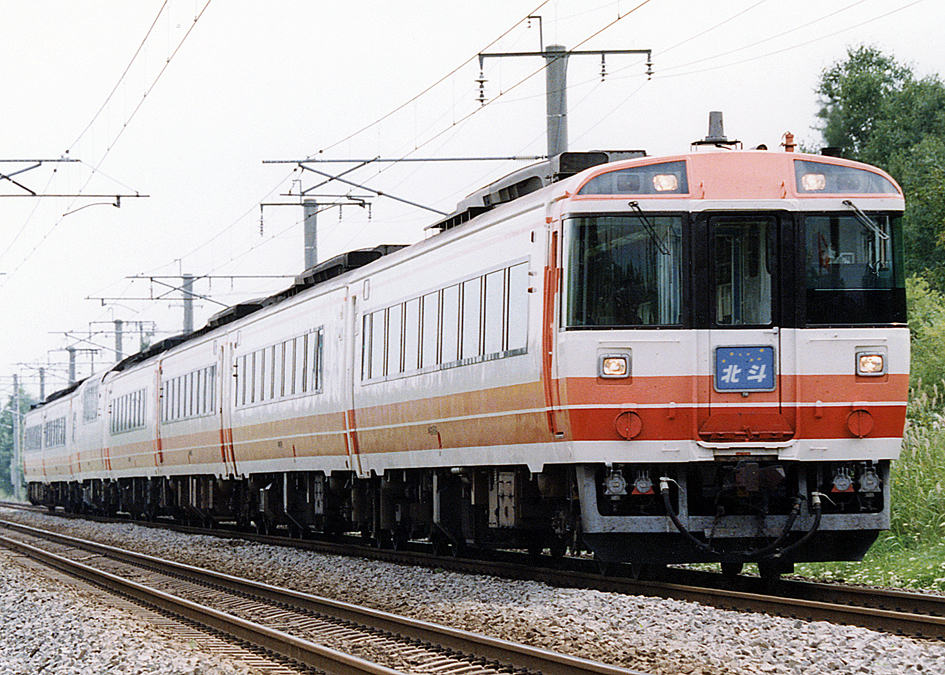
- N183 Hokuto service near Osatsu Station, 1992
- Constructed: 1986
- Entered service: 1986
- Scrapped: 1994–2019
- Number built: 36 cars
- Number scrapped: 7 cars
- Capacity: 60 (KiHa 183-500); 68 (KiHa 183-1500); 60 (KiHa 182-500)

Specifications
- Maximum speed: 110 km/h (68 mph) (initial); 120 km/h (75 mph) (later)

36 cars of what would become the 183-500 and 183–1500 series were manufactured in 1986 at Niigata Engineering Co., Ltd. and Fuji Heavy Industries, with the main purpose of improving the management base of JR Hokkaido. These cars were also known as the N183 series.

Classification	Car nos.	No. built	Notes	Ref.
KiHa 183-500	1–7	7	A passenger car with a capacity of 60 people, equipped with a driver's cab and a bathroom. It uses the larger engine on the intermediate KiHa 182-500 cars and without the electricity generating engine, in order to shorten train sets and increase frequency. 502 was scrapped due to damage in 1994, 501 was scrapped in 2010, and 503 and 504 were scrapped in 2019. 505 and 506 were remodeled to 405 and 406 after upgrade works and a reduction in engine power, and 507 was remodeled to a KiHa 183-6001 car.	
KiHa 183-1500	1–7	7	A passenger car with a capacity of 68 people and a driver's cab – no bathroom was in this car. This follows the KiHa 183-0 and has two smaller engines, one for generating electricity.	
KiHa 182-500	1–14	14	An intermediate passenger car equipped with a bathroom, with a seating capacity of 68 passengers. 14 cars were produced in 1986. Some were modified into the KiHa 182-400, similar to the KiHa 183-400.	
KiRo 182-500	1–8	8	Eight cars of this type were built in 1986.	

KiHa 183-500 & 183-1500 series pictures
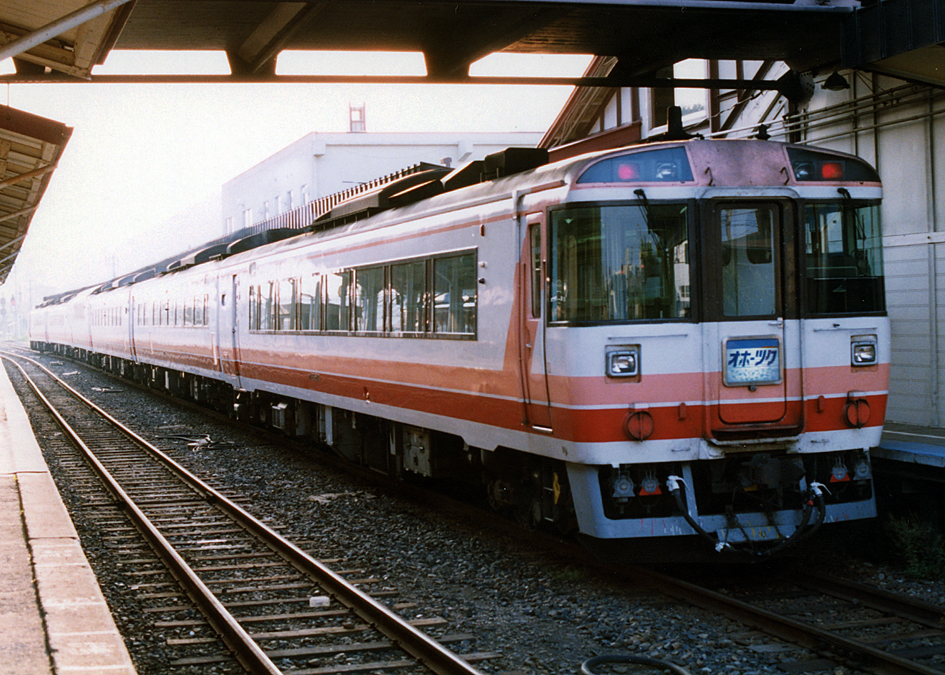
KiHa 183-500 Okhotsk service stopped at Abashiri Station

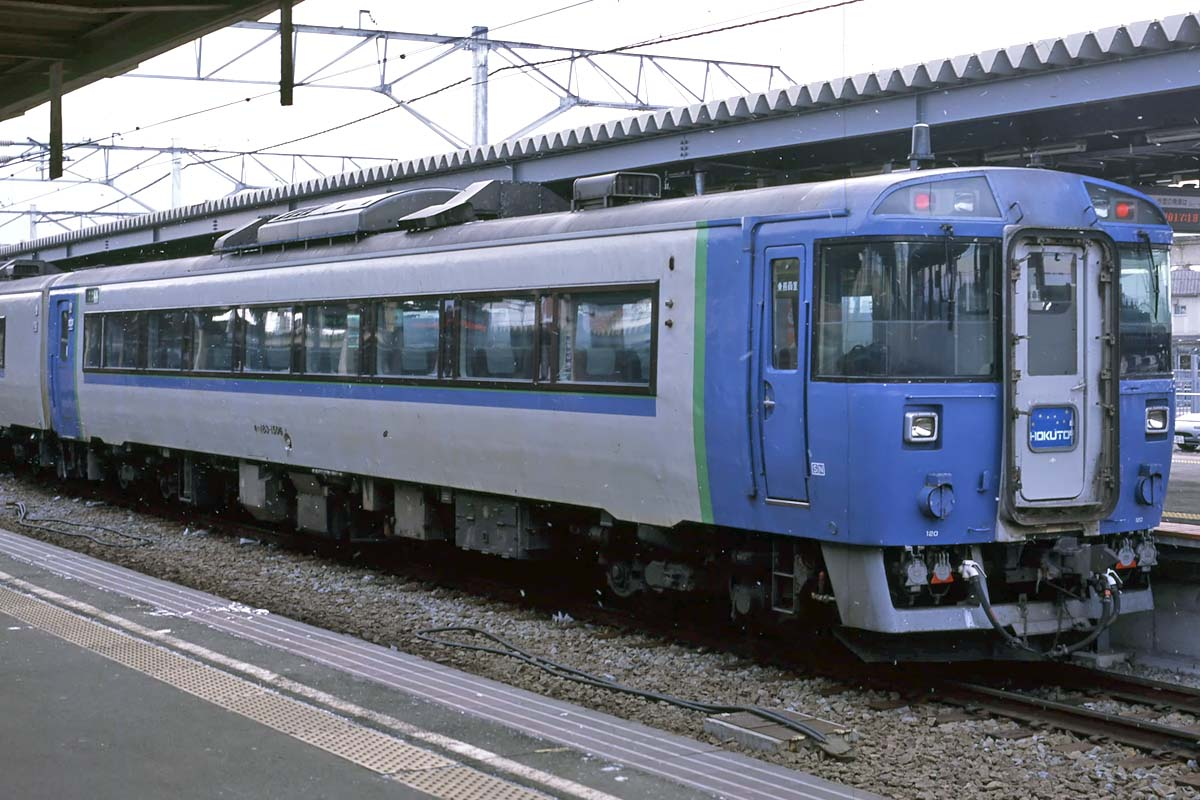
KiHa 183-1506 front car at Hakodate Station

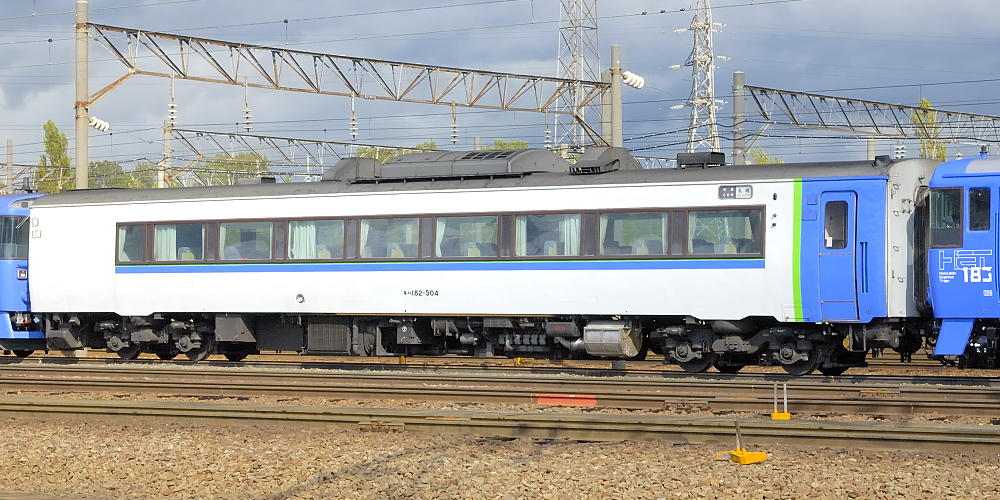
KiHa 182-504 car near Sapporo

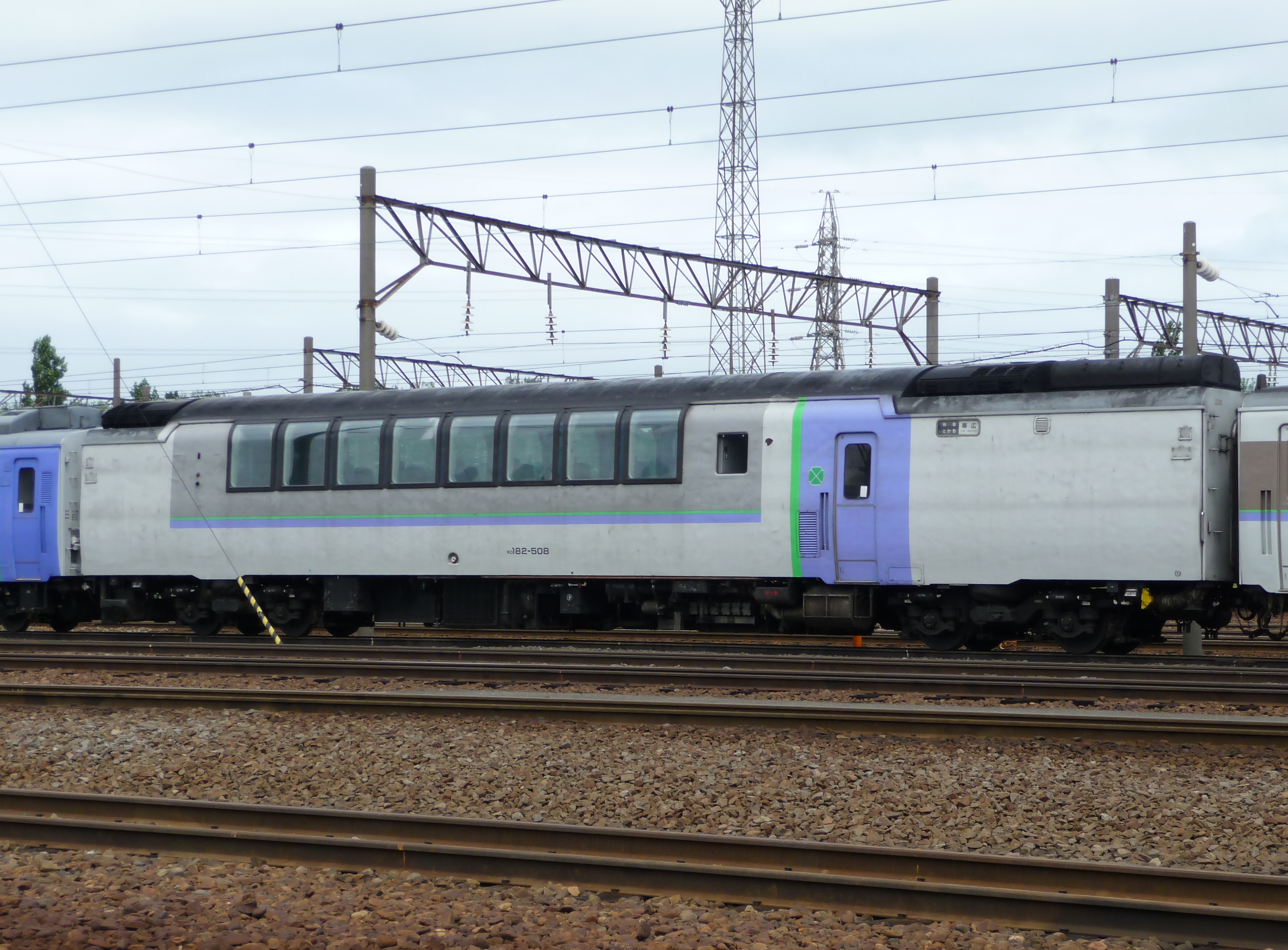
KiRo 182-508 car

==== 183-550 & 183-1550 series ====
183-550 & 183-1550 series (NN183 series)
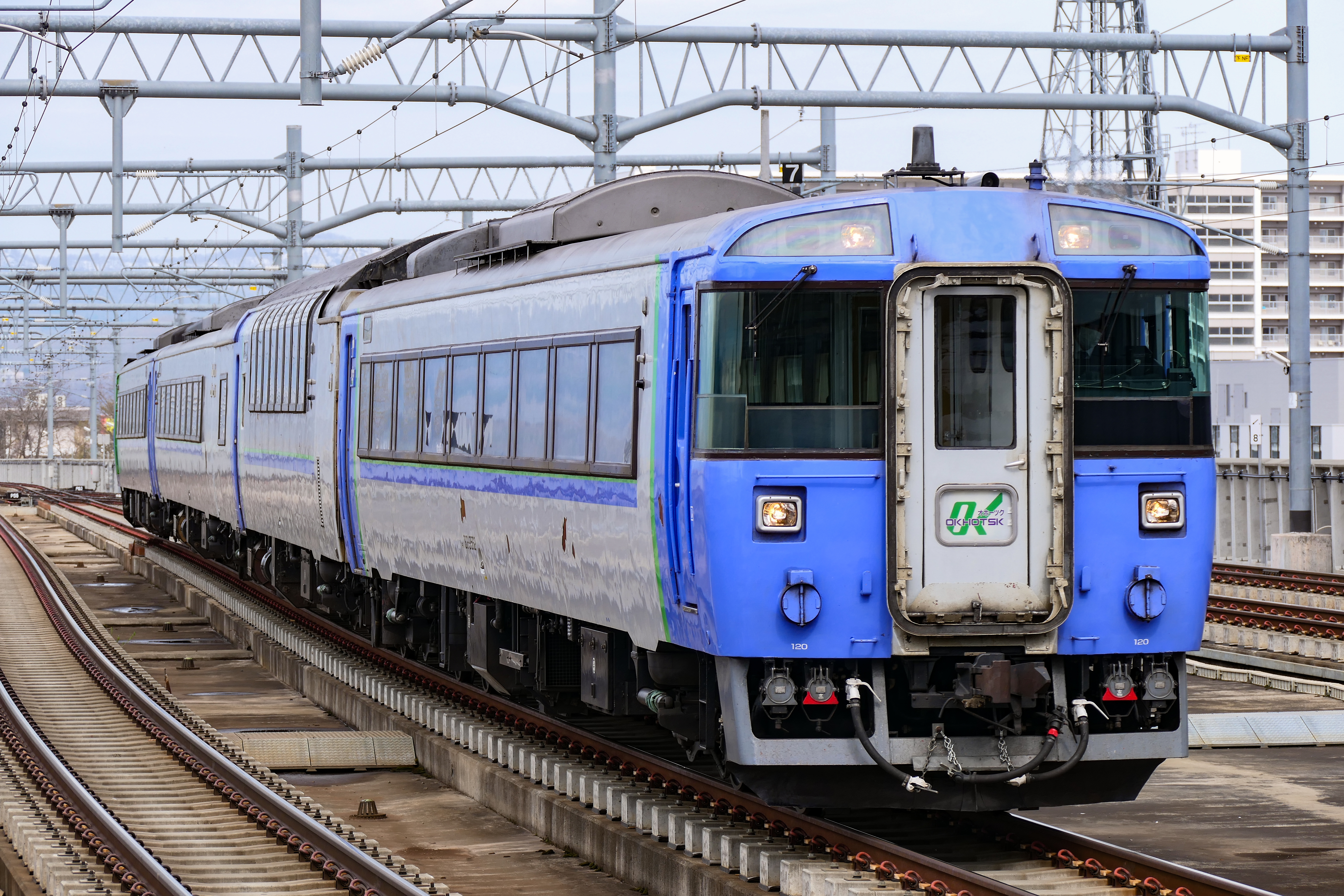
- NN183 series set on Okhotsk service in 2021
- Constructed: 1988–1991
- Entered service: 1988
- Number built: 32 cars
- Number scrapped: 4 (KiSaRoHa 182-550)
- Capacity: 68 (KiHa 183-1550); 68 (KiHa 182-550); 10 ordinary + 24 green (KiSaRoHa 182-550)

Specifications
- Maximum speed: 120–130 km/h (75–81 mph) (KiSaRoHa 182-550 limited to 120 km/h [75 mph])

28 cars of what would become the 183-550 and 183-1550 series were manufactured by Fuji Heavy Industries between 1988 and 1990. Also known as the NN183 series, these cars would feature changes to the bathroom and interior from the N183 series cars. These cars would also see installation of a fresh air intake to ensure no engine smoke entered the cabin.

Classification	Car nos.	No. built	Notes	Ref.
KiHa 183-1550	1–16	16	An ordinary passenger car with a driver's cab; these cars did not feature a bathroom and had a capacity of 68 people. They also come with two smaller engines, one for electricity. Cars 1555–1566 would introduce cosmetic changes, which included changes to seat numbers and the window frame. KiHa 183-1557 was eventually remodeled into KiHa 183-6101. Some received brake upgrades to allow for 130-kilometre-per-hour (81 mph) operation, and they became the KiHa 183-3550 and -4550 (Which can also control the brake systems of the 110 / 120 km/h (68 / 75 mph) cars). Some of them have the engine swapped with a unit similar to that of a KiHa 261, and -3550/4550 were then renamed KiHa 183-8550/9550.	
KiHa 182-550	1–12	12	An intermediate passenger car with a boys' bathroom; 12 cars of this type were manufactured between 1988 and 1989. Cars 555–562 were improved in the same way that KiHa 183-1555 to 183-1566 were, along with bathroom improvements. Some of these also received brake upgrades to allow for 130-kilometre-per-hour (81 mph) operation, and they were reclassified as KiHa 183-2550. All cars were eventually refurbished into -7550 cars by engine replacement.	
KiSaRoHa 182-550	1–4	4	A double deck car with 10 ordinary seats on the first floor, and 24 green class seats in a 2+1 arrangement on the second floor; four cars of this type were manufactured in 1991. This car was used on Super Tokachi services from 1991 until 2000, when they were demoted to Tokachi services due to the introduction of KiHa 283 series trains. These cars were placed into storage in 2001 and scrapped in 2013.	

KiHa 183-550 & 183-1550 series pictures
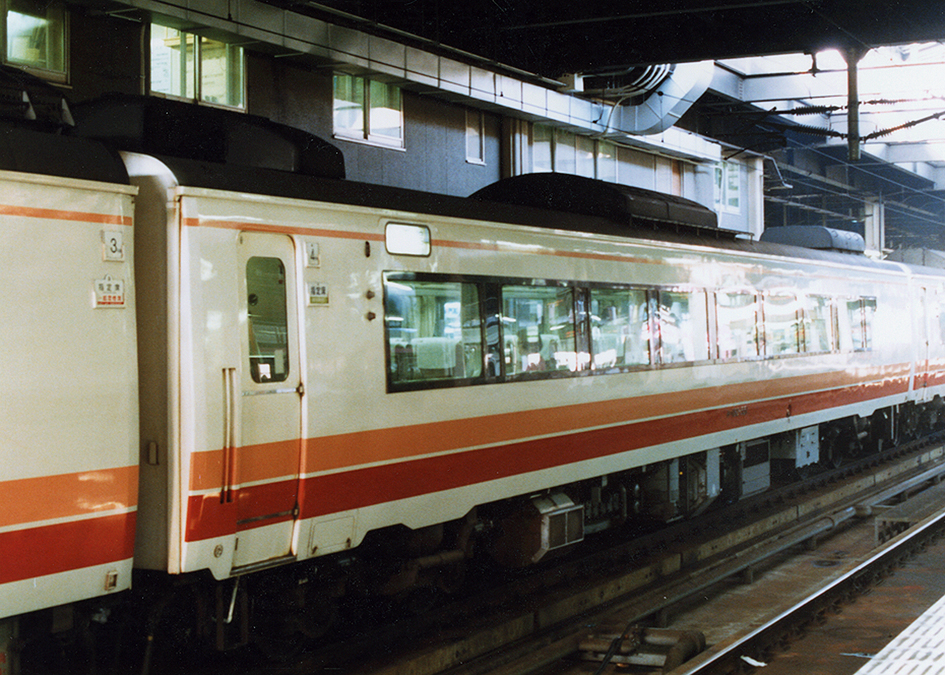
KiHa 182-550 series car at Sapporo

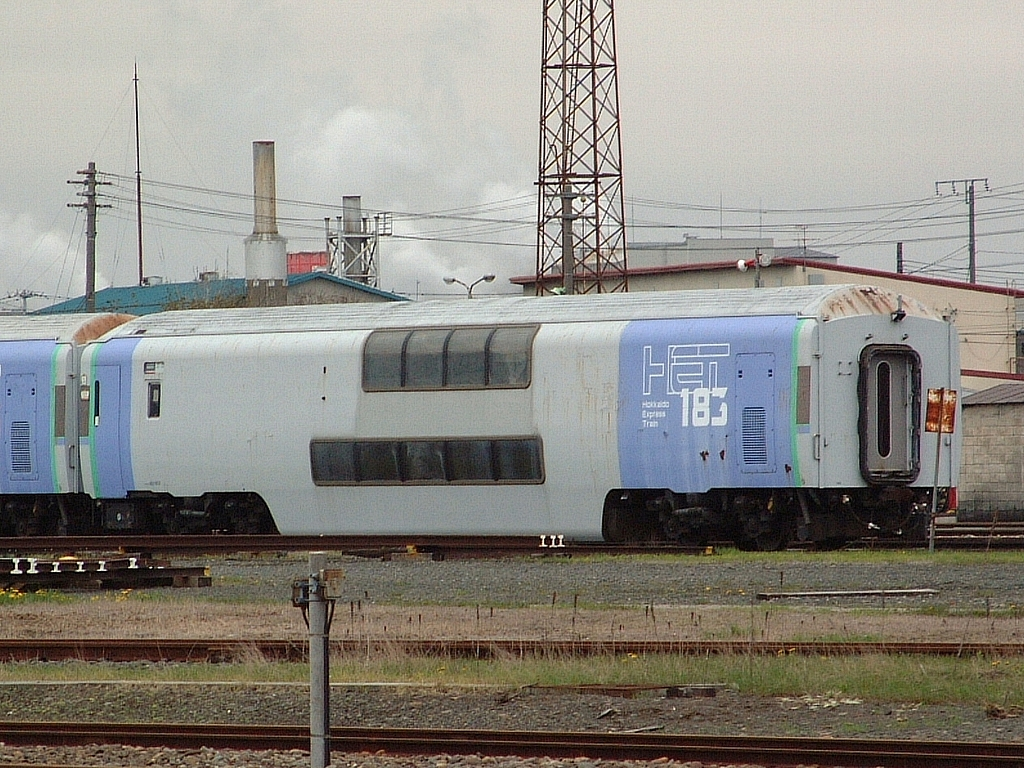
KiSaRoHa 182-550 car in storage, 2005

183-5000, 183-5100 & 183-5200 series
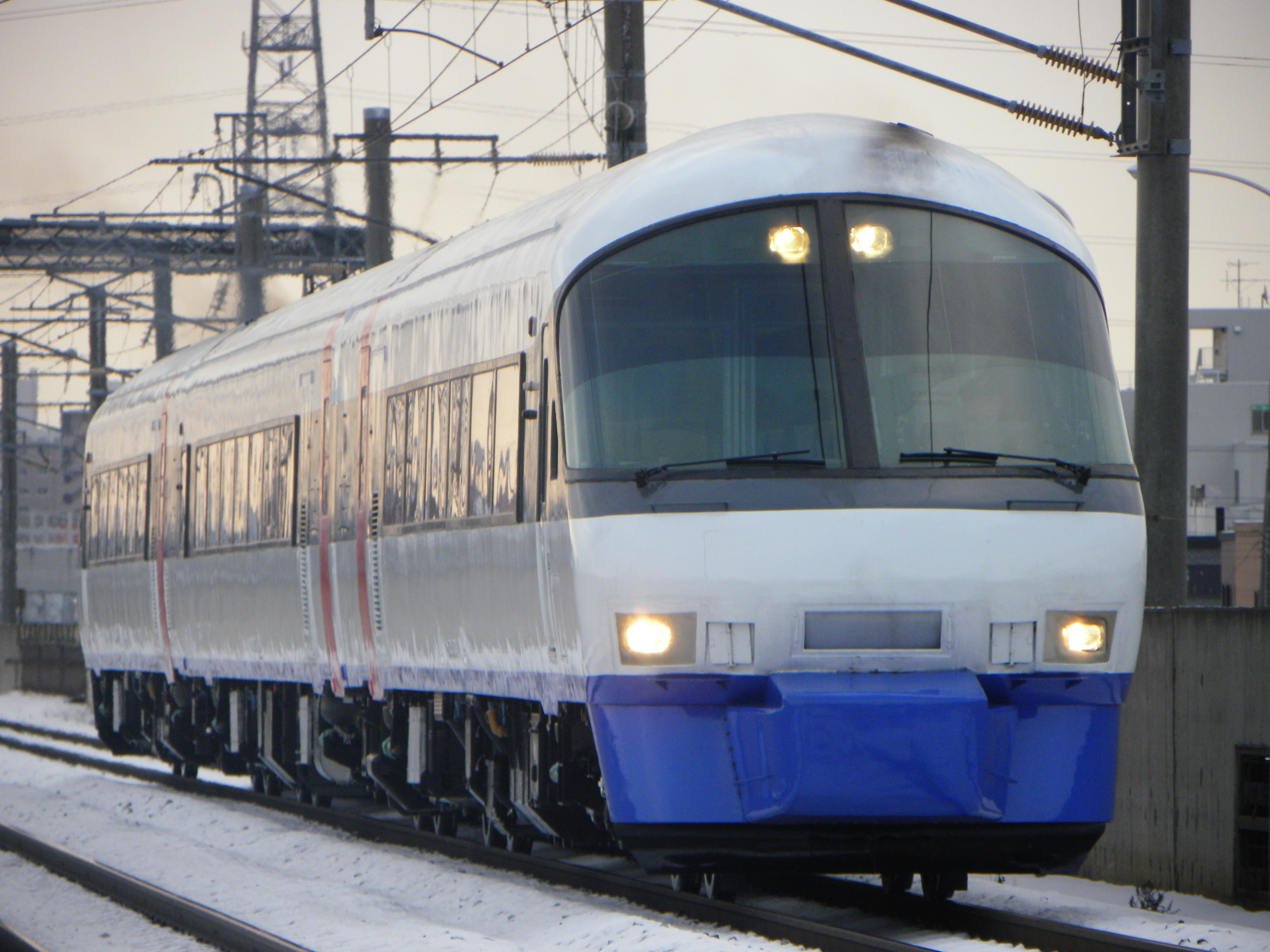
- 183-5000 series Niseko Express on Hakodate Main Line near Sapporo, 2010

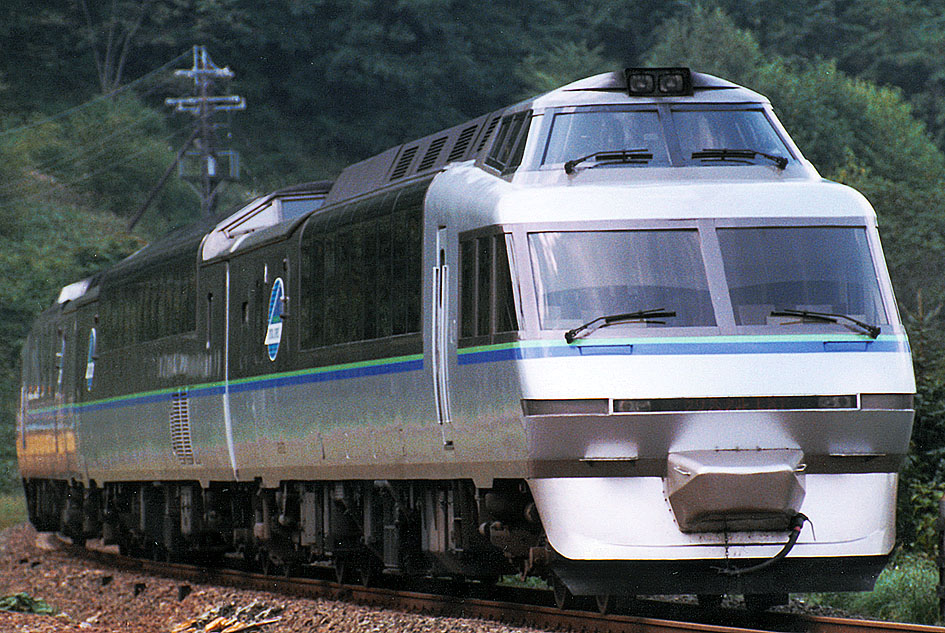
- Crystal Express in 3-car configuration near Shintoku, 1990
- Constructed: 1988–1991
- Entered service: 1989 (Niseko Express)
- Number built: 12 cars (3 sets)

Specifications
- Maximum speed: 120 km/h (75 mph)

==== Resort trains (183-5000, 183-5100 and 183-5200 series) ====
Due to the Sekishō Line opening in 1981 and the number of passengers to resort areas in the Central Hokkaido area increasing, a decision was made to modify the Alpha Continental 56 series train in 1985. After adding two services (the Furano Express and Tomamu-Sahoro Express) based on the 80 series trains, the design was changed to that of the 183 series. In total, 3 sets (12 cars) were built, and the new sets began service, starting with the Niseko Express in 1989. This was followed by the Crystal Express Tomamu & Sahoro set in the same year and the North Rainbow Express set in 1992. The North Rainbow Express set originally consisted of three cars, but in December 1994, it was lengthened to five cars.

Due to age, the Crystal Express set was withdrawn from service on 30 November 2019, and was scrapped in May 2020.

In July 2022, JR Hokkaido announced that the North Rainbow Express set would be withdrawn from service in Q1 2023.

===== 183-5000 series (Niseko Express) =====
KiHa 183-5000 (5001–5002)
An ordinary driving car with a capacity of 48 people and equipped with a bathroom. Two cars of this type were built in 1988.
KiHa 182-5000 (5001)
An intermediate passenger car with a capacity of 56, equipped with a telephone room.

===== 183-5100 series (Crystal Express Tomamu & Sahoro) =====
KiHa 183-5100 (5101–5102)
An ordinary driving car equipped with an observation deck. It had eight observation seats, but due to risk mitigation measures caused by a 789 series train colliding with a level crossing in January 2010, the deck was closed off.

KiHa 182-5100 (5101)
An intermediate passenger car with a capacity of 56 people, equipped with a skylight.

KiSaRoHa 182-5100 (5101)
A double-deck car built in December 1990. It is not equipped with an engine.

===== 183-5200 series (North Rainbow Express) =====
KiHa 183-5200 (5201–5202)
An ordinary driving car with a capacity of 47 people. KiHa 183-5201 was damaged in an accident in February 1997, and was substituted with the KiHa 183-1 car while repair works took place.

KiHa 182-5200 (5201, 5251)
An intermediate passenger car with a capacity of 60 people.

KiSaHa 182-5200 (5201)
A double deck passenger car with a capacity of 36 people, equipped with a buffet room on the first floor and private rooms on the second floor.
KiHa 183 series resort train pictures
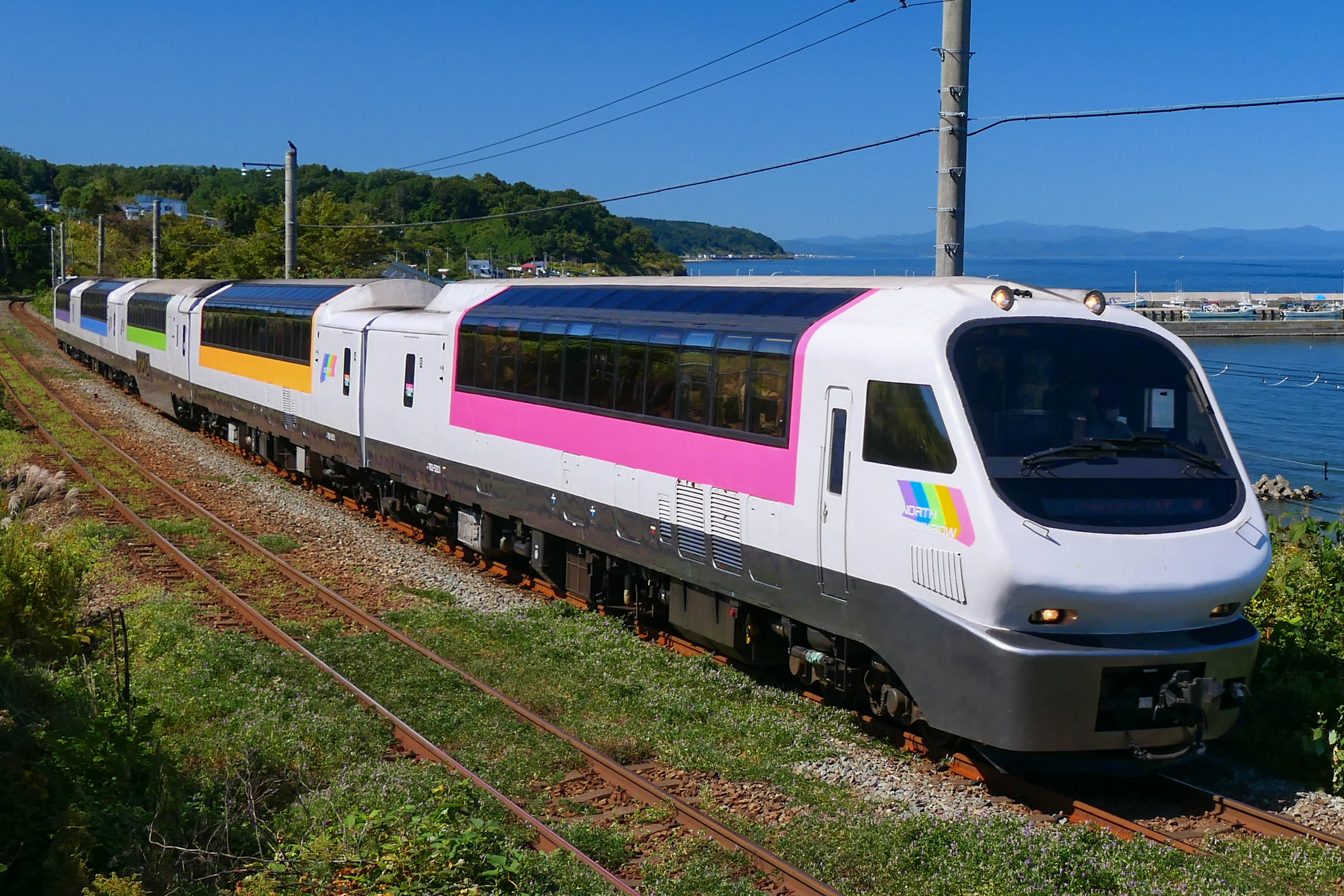
KiHa 183-5200 North Rainbow Express train on Niseko service, 2022

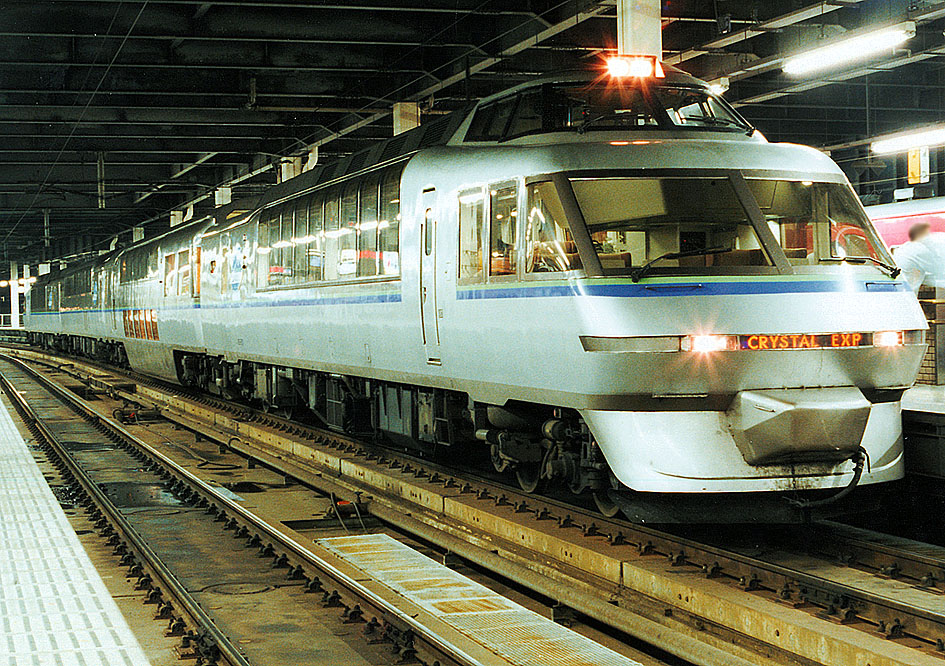
Crystal Express train, 1992

==== 183-1000 series (JR Kyushu) ====
183-1000 series
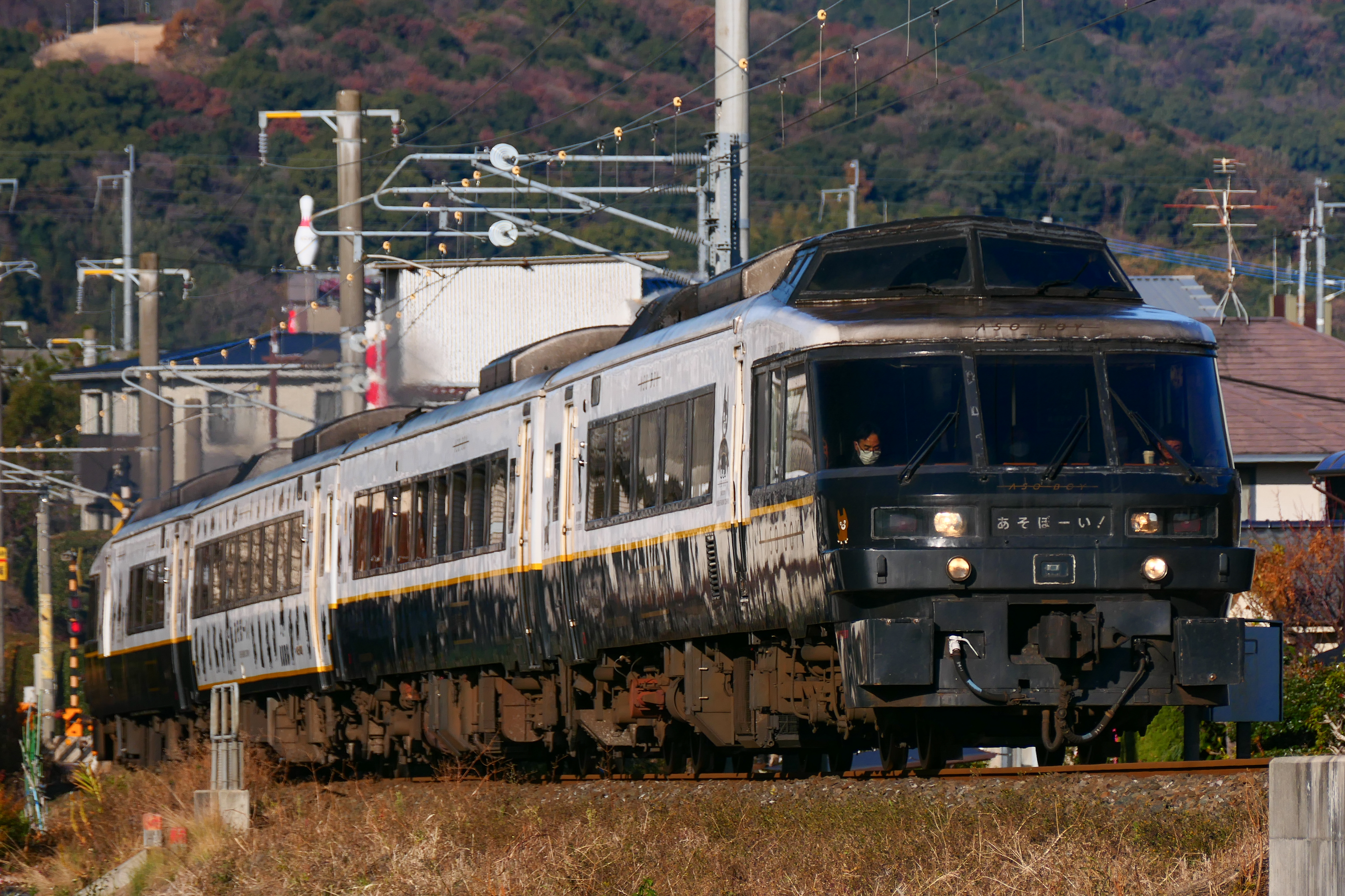
- 183-1000 series set on Aso Boy service, 2023
- Constructed: 1988–1989
- Entered service: 1988
- Number built: 4 cars (1 set)
- Capacity: 52 (KiHa 183-1000) 48 (KiHa 182-1001) 68 (KiHa 182-1002)

Specifications
- Maximum speed: 120 km/h (75 mph)
- Multiple working: 485 series

Four cars of what would be known as the 183-1000 series were manufactured between 1988 and 1989, originally for services to the Holland Village located in Nagasaki. Due to the Tosu to Mojikō section of the Kagoshima Main Line experiencing high demand, a coupler was added to the front end to enable joint working with 485 series trains.

KiHa 183-1000 (1001, 1002)
Two cars were produced in 1988. They do not have an in-built power supply.

KiHa 182-1000 (1001, 1002)
An intermediate car; one (1001) was manufactured in 1988, and was equipped with a power supply as well as cafe and small rooms. Another car (1002) was manufactured in 1989 and came equipped with an engine as well as having an onboard children's play area.
KiHa 183-1000 series pictures
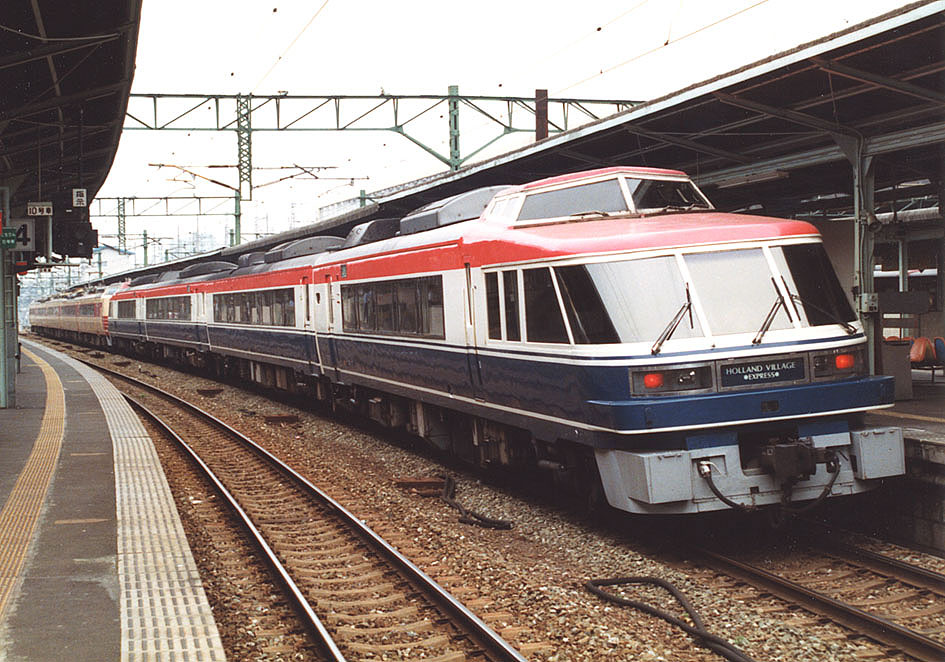
KiHa 183-1000 Huis ten bosch service coupled with 485 series train at Kokura, 1990

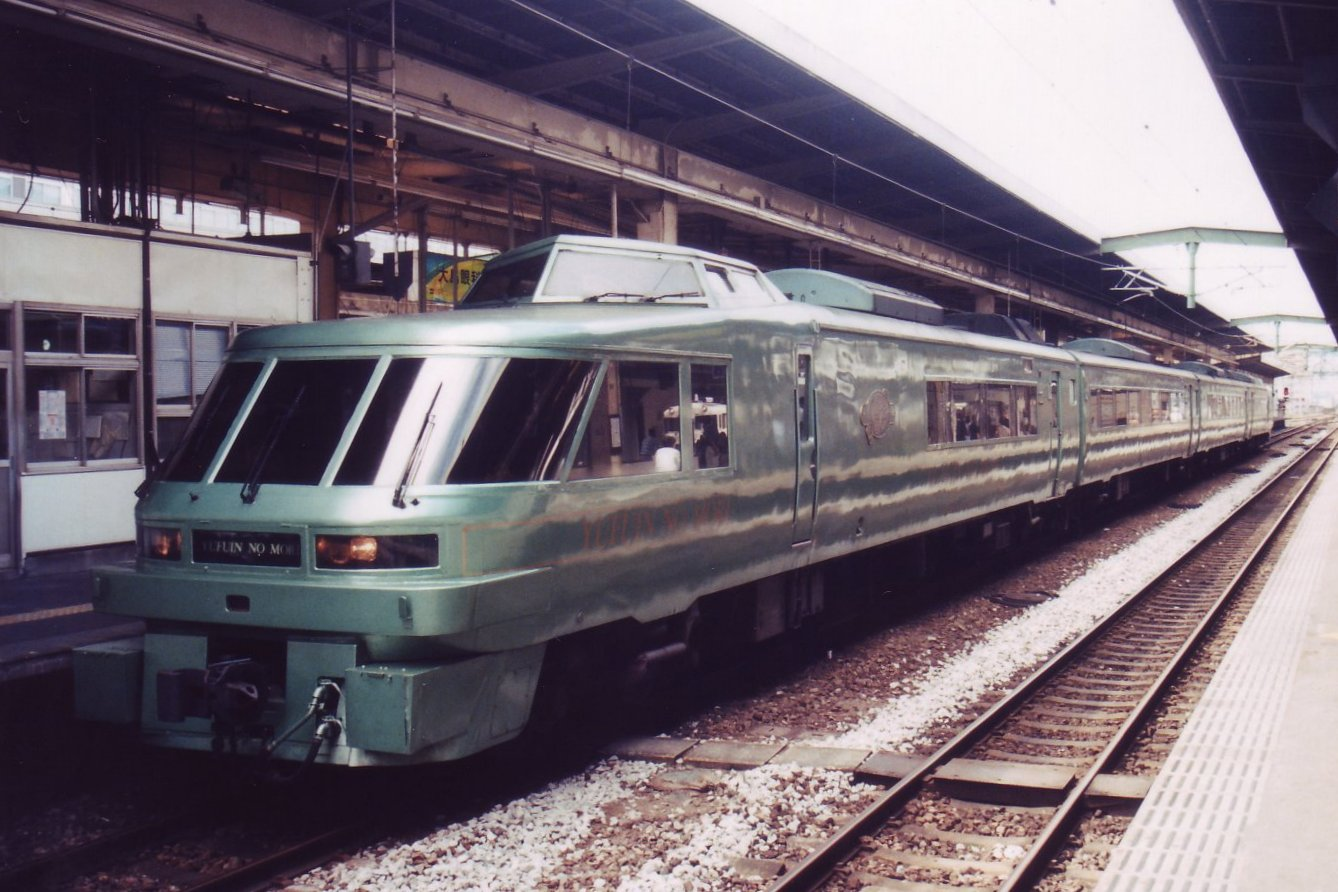
KiHa 183-1000 Yufuin no Mori II train stopped at Hakata, 1992

== Special services ==
=== Asahiyama Zoo ===
In 2007, several KiHa 183–0 series cars were renovated for use on the Asahiyama Zoo limited express service (which was named because of the zoo's popularity) from Sapporo to Asahikawa, which also made stops at Iwamizawa and Takikawa stations.

Designed by former zookeeper and children's book author Hiroshi Abe, the complete set consisted of the Polar Bear (KiHa 183–3), Wolf (KiHa 182–46), Lion (KiHa 182–47), Chimpanzee (KiHa 182–48), and Penguin (KiHa 183–4) cars, and the external livery consisted of drawn children and animals.

In addition to changes to the children's playroom in the Polar Bear car and the introduction of a nursing room in the Penguin car, each car was equipped with a seat that was shaped like an animal (known as a "hug-hug" chair), intended for photography. These were replaced with stuffed animals in some seats in 2013.

This set ran from 2007 (with a brief pause between April and July 2013 due to refurbishment works) to March 2018, when the set was scrapped. The Asahiyama Zoo service was transferred to 789 series trains, and was eventually integrated with Lilac services.

Asahiyama Zoo pictures
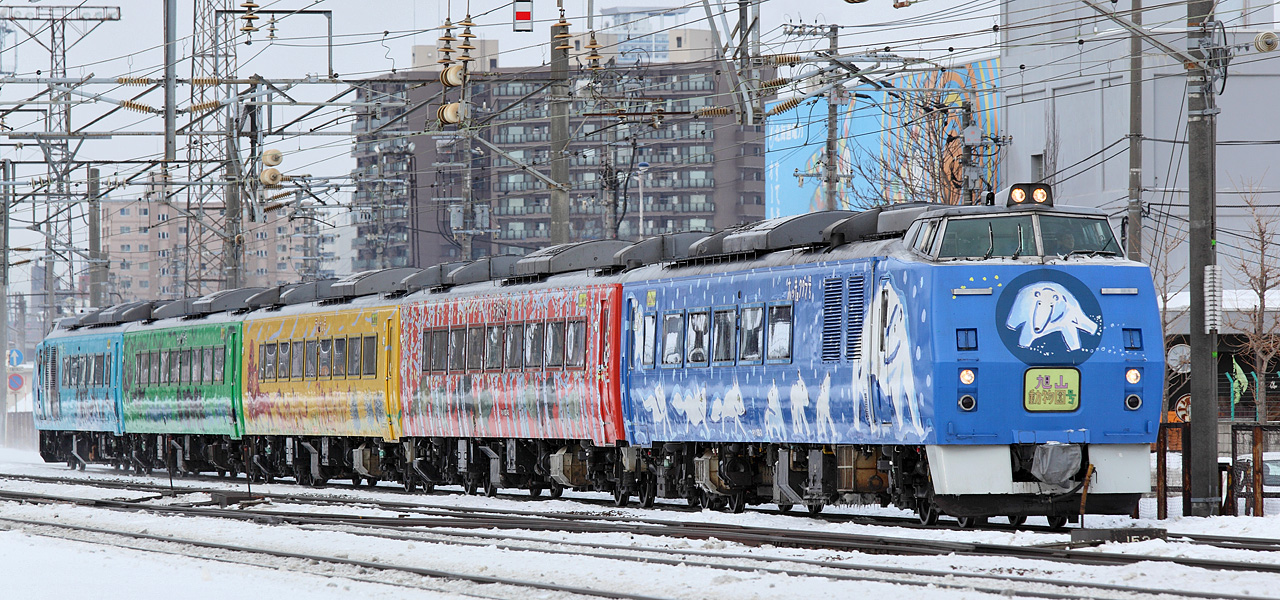
Pre-refurbishment Asahiyama Zoo service between Naebo and Shiraishi

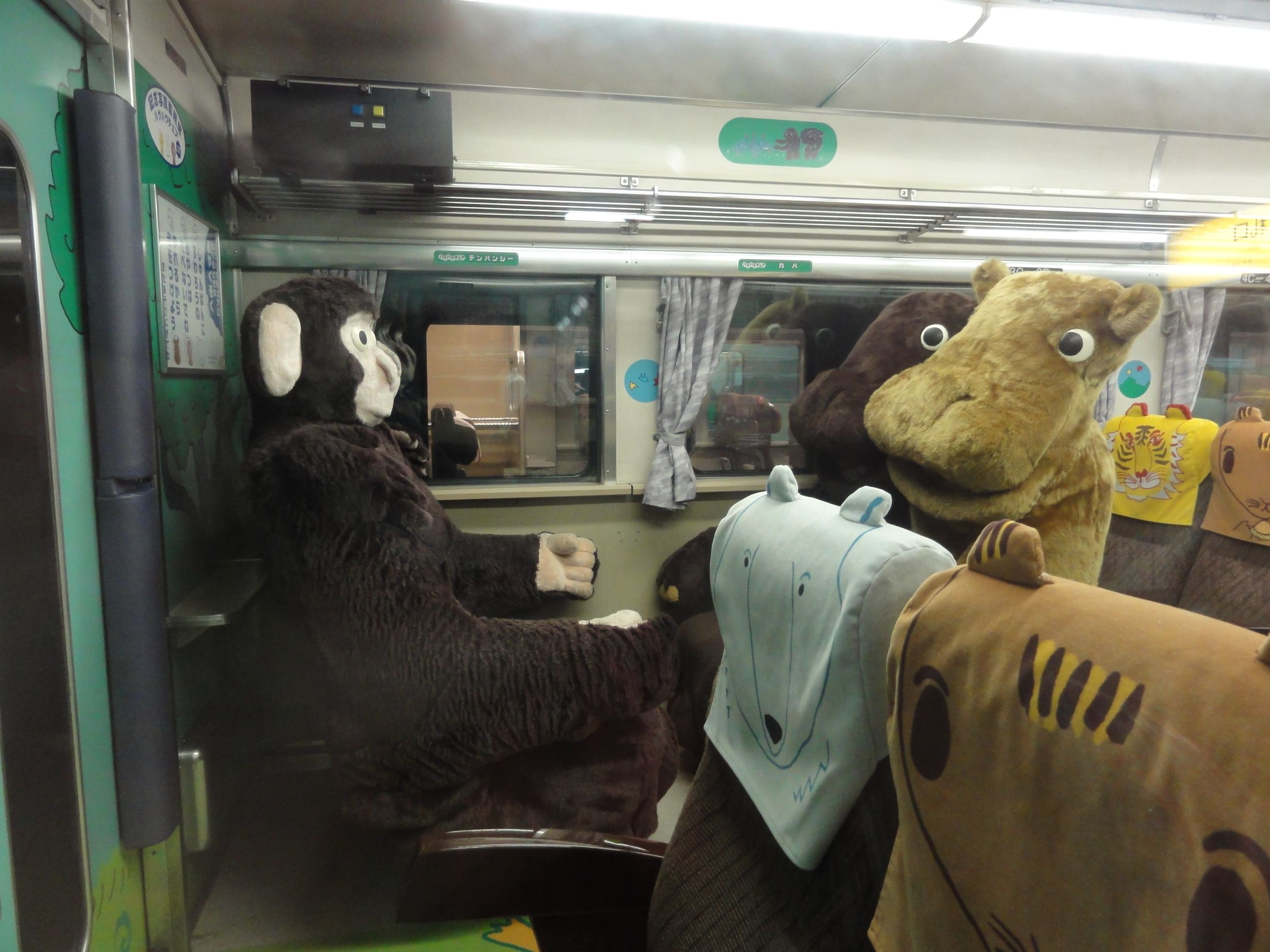
"Hug-hug" chair in pre-refurbishment Chimpanzee car

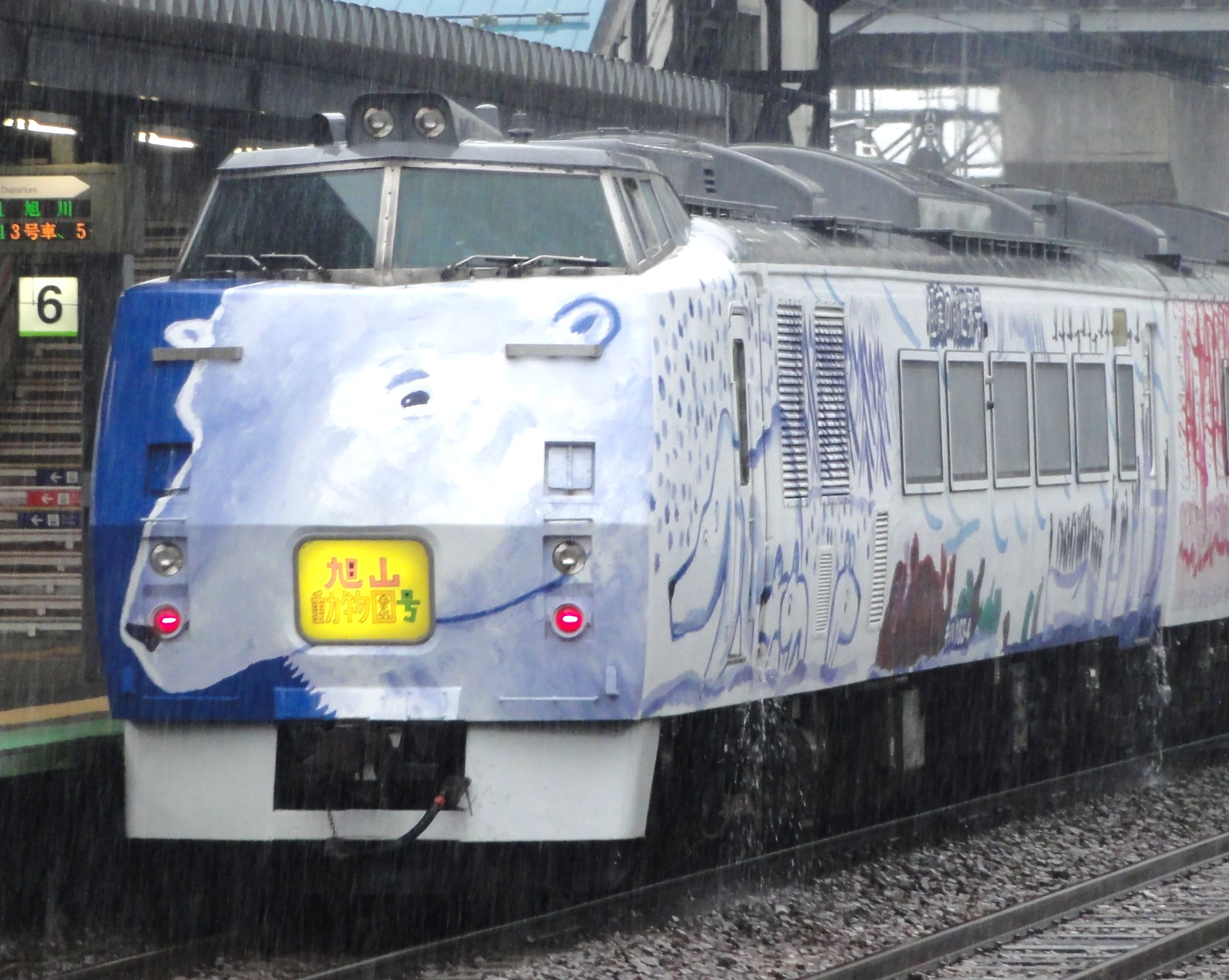
Post-refurbishment Asahiyama Zoo set

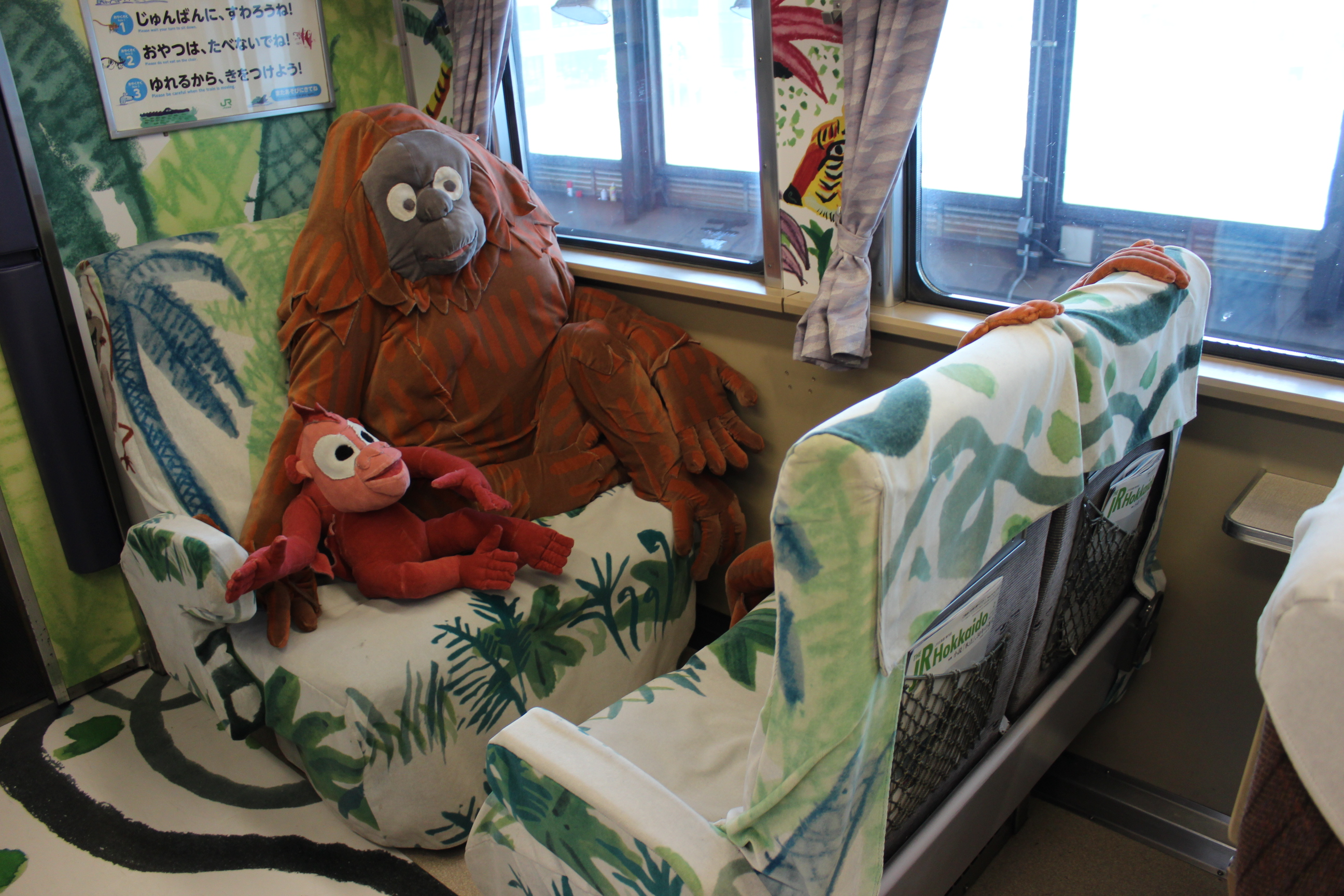
"Hug-hug" chair located in Tropical Jungle post-refurbishment car

== Preserved cars ==
=== 183-214, 183-220 ===
The restoration of 183-214 was funded by crowdfunding, and after being restored to JNR colors, it eventually was placed in the Abira Roadside Station, alongside 183–220.

Whilst 183-214 is on public display, 183-220 is in storage.

=== 183-5001 (Niseko Express) ===
After having its restoration crowdfunded, it is now stored at the Arishima Memorial Hall.

== See also ==
- Joyful Train
