= Suizenji Station =

Railway station in Kumamoto, Japan

Suizenji Station 水前寺駅
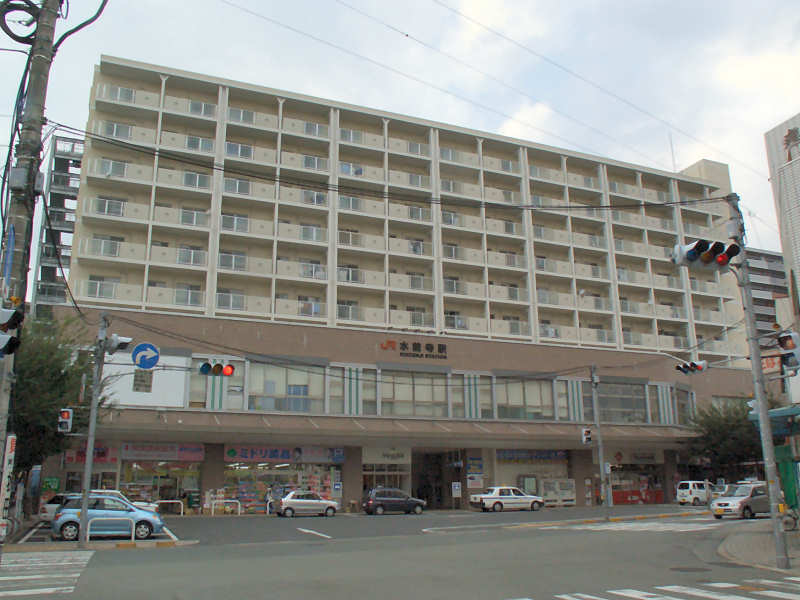
- Suizenji Station in 2006

General information
- Location: 1-chōme-4 Suizenji, Chuo-ku, Kumamoto-shi, Kumamoto-ken, 862-0950; Japan
- Coordinates: 32°47′50″N 130°43′49″E
- Operator: JR Kyushu
- Line: ■ Hōhi Main Line
- Distance: 5.8 km from Kumamoto
- Platforms: 1 island platform
- Tracks: 2

Construction
- Accessible: Yes - elevator to station and platform

Other information
- Status: Staffed ticket window (Midori no Madoguchi)(outsourced)
- Website: Official website

History
- Opened: 21 June 1914; 112 years ago

Passengers
- FY2020: 2538 daily
- Rank: 58th (among JR Kyushu stations)

Services
Preceding station	JR Kyushu	Following station
Shin-Suizenji towards Kumamoto	Hōhi Main Line	Tōkai-Gakuen-mae towards Ōita
Location
- Location within Kumamoto Prefecture Location within Japan

Suizenji Station (水前寺駅, Suizenji-eki) is a passenger railway station located in the Chūō-ku ward of the city of Kumamoto, Kumamoto Prefecture, Japan. It is operated by JR Kyushu.

== Lines ==
The station is served by the Hōhi Main Line and is located 5.8 km from the starting point of the line at Kumamoto.

== Layout ==
The station consists of an island platform serving two tracks at grade. The station building is integrated within a modern multi-storey building with many shops and commercial tenants as well as apartments on the upper floors. The station itself is located on level 2 and includes an enclosed waiting room and a staffed ticket window. A passageway leads to a flight of steps which connects to the island platform. The same passageway also serves to connect to a second entrance to the station serving the street on the other side of the tracks. There is also elevator access to the station from street level and from the station to the platform.

Management of the station has been outsourced to the JR Kyushu Tetsudou Eigyou Co., a wholly owned subsidiary of JR Kyushu specialising in station services. It staffs the ticket booth which is equipped with a Midori no Madoguchi facility.

=== Platforms ===
1	■ Hōhi Main Line	for Kumamoto
2	■ Hōhi Main Line	for Higo-Ōzu and Aso

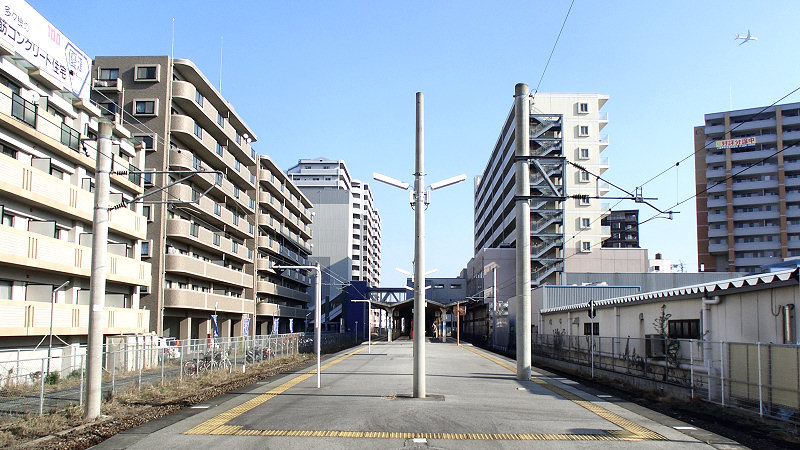
A view of the station platform and tracks. Note the passageway in the distance which leads to the second station entrance.

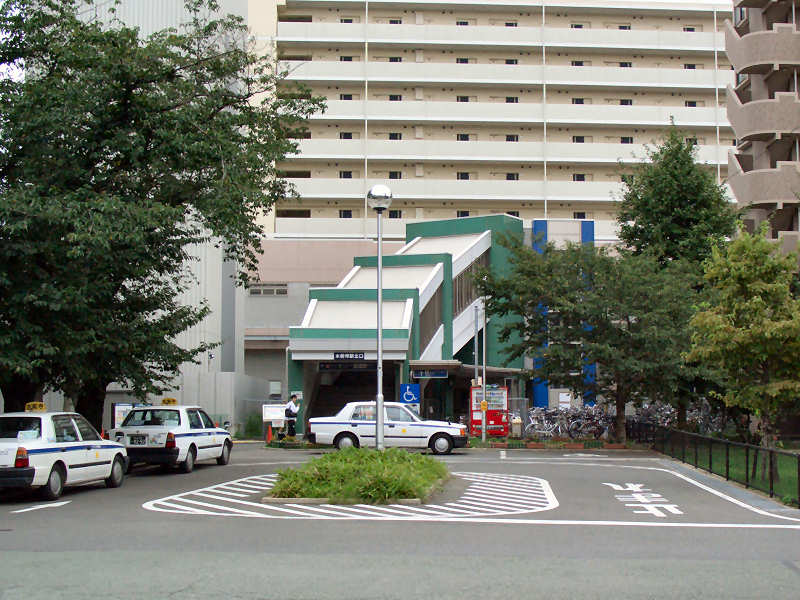
The second station entrance, on the north side of the tracks.

== History ==
On 21 June 1914, Japanese Government Railways (JGR) opened the Miyagi Light Rail Line (宮地軽便線) (later the Miyagi Line) from Kumamoto eastwards to Higo-Ōzu. On the same day, this station was opened as one of several intermediate stations along the track. By 1928, the track had been extended eastward and had linked up with the Inukai Line (犬飼線) which had been built westward from Ōita. On 2 December 1928, the entire track from Kumamoto to Ōita was designated as the Hōhi Main Line. With the privatization of Japanese National Railways (JNR), the successor of JGR, on 1 April 1987, the station came under the control of JR Kyushu.

== Passenger statistics ==
In fiscal 2020, the station was used by an average of 2538 passengers daily (boarding passengers only), and it ranked 58th among the busiest stations of JR Kyushu.

== Surrounding area ==
- Suizen-ji Jōju-en
- Kumamoto Gakuen University

== See also ==
- List of railway stations in Japan
