= Shin-Suizenji Station =

Railway station in Kumamoto, Japan

Shin-Suizenji Station 新水前寺駅
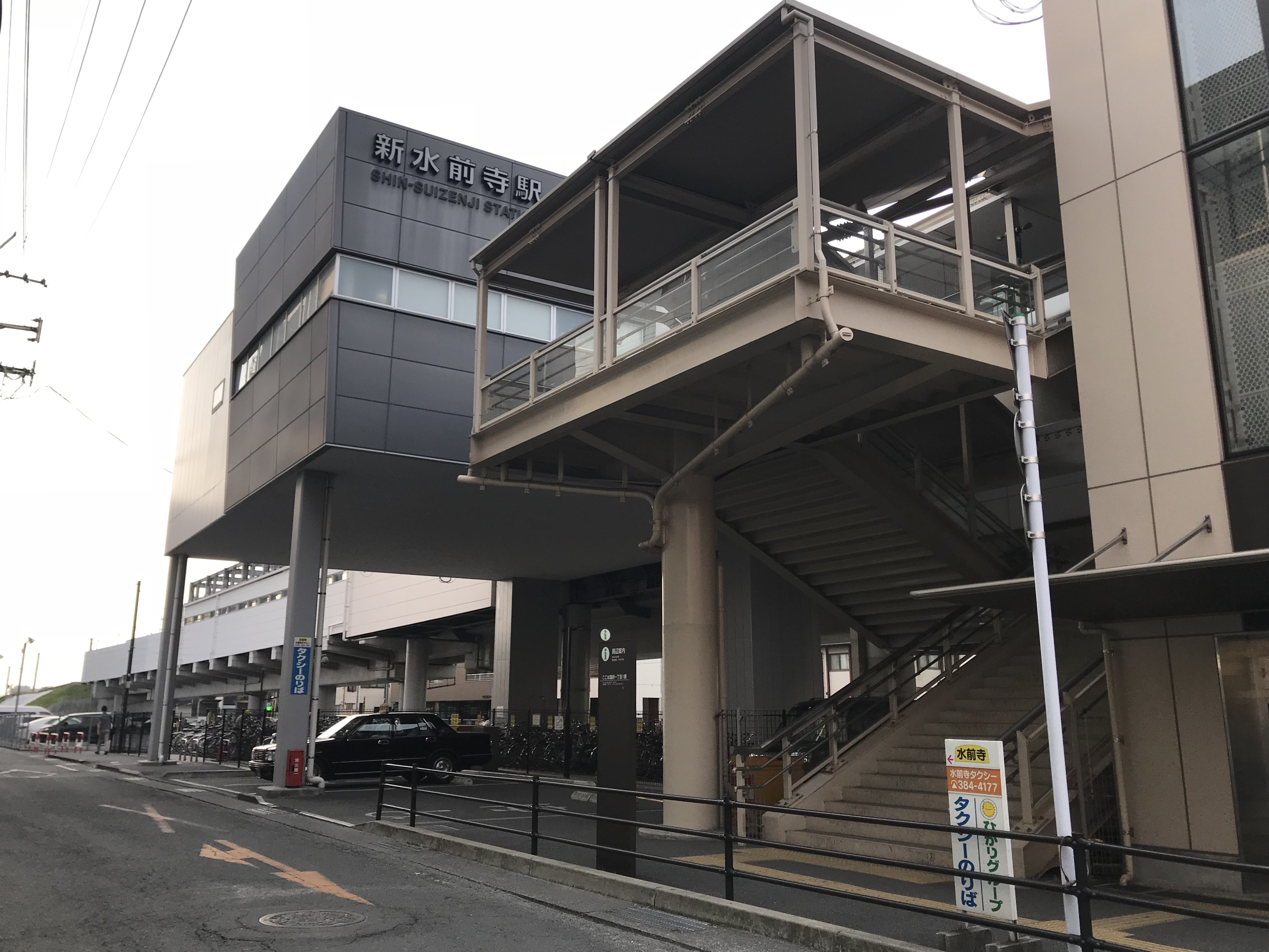
- Shin-Suizenji Station in 2018

General information
- Location: 1-1-31 Kokufu, Chuo-ku, Kumamoto-shi, Kumamoto-ken, 862-0949; Japan
- Coordinates: 32°47′37″N 130°43′34″E
- Operator: JR Kyushu
- Line: ■ Hōhi Main Line
- Distance: 5.2 km from Kumamoto
- Platforms: 1 side platform
- Tracks: 1
- Connections: Kumamoto City Tram Shin-Suizenji Ekimae Station, A and B-lines

Construction
- Structure type: Elevated
- Cycle facilities: Parking for bikes under elevated structure
- Accessible: Yes - elevator to station and platform

Other information
- Status: Staffed ticket window (Midori no Madoguchi)(outsourced)
- Website: Official website

History
- Opened: 13 March 1988; 38 years ago
- Rebuilt: 2011

Passengers
- FY2020: 3,882 daily
- Rank: 43rd (among JR Kyushu stations)

Services
Preceding station	JR Kyushu	Following station
Minami-Kumamoto towards Kumamoto	Hōhi Main Line	Suizenji towards Ōita
Location
- Location within Kumamoto Prefecture Location within Japan

Shin-Suizenji Station (新水前寺駅, Shin-Suizenji-eki) is a passenger railway station located in the Chūō-ku ward of the city of Kumamoto, Kumamoto Prefecture, Japan. It is operated by JR Kyushu.

== Lines ==
The station is served by the Hōhi Main Line and is located 5.2 km from the starting point of the line at Kumamoto.

== Layout ==
The station consists of a side platform serving a single elevated track. The station building is a modern elevated structure built in 2011, incorporating a staffed ticket window, automatic ticket vending machines, SUGOCA charge machines and readers, and an enclosed waiting room. The station building is accessed from street level by means of a flight of steps or an elevator. Two flights of steps also lead up to the station from the platforms of the nearby Shin-Suizenji ekimae tram stop operated by the Kumamoto City Transportation Bureau. Parking for bicycles is available underneath the elevated track.

Management of the station has been outsourced to the JR Kyushu Tetsudou Eigyou Co., a wholly owned subsidiary of JR Kyushu specialising in station services. It staffs the ticket booth which is equipped with a Midori no Madoguchi facility.

=== Platforms ===
1	■ Hōhi Main Line	for Kumamoto
2	■ Hōhi Main Line	for Higo-Ōzu and Aso

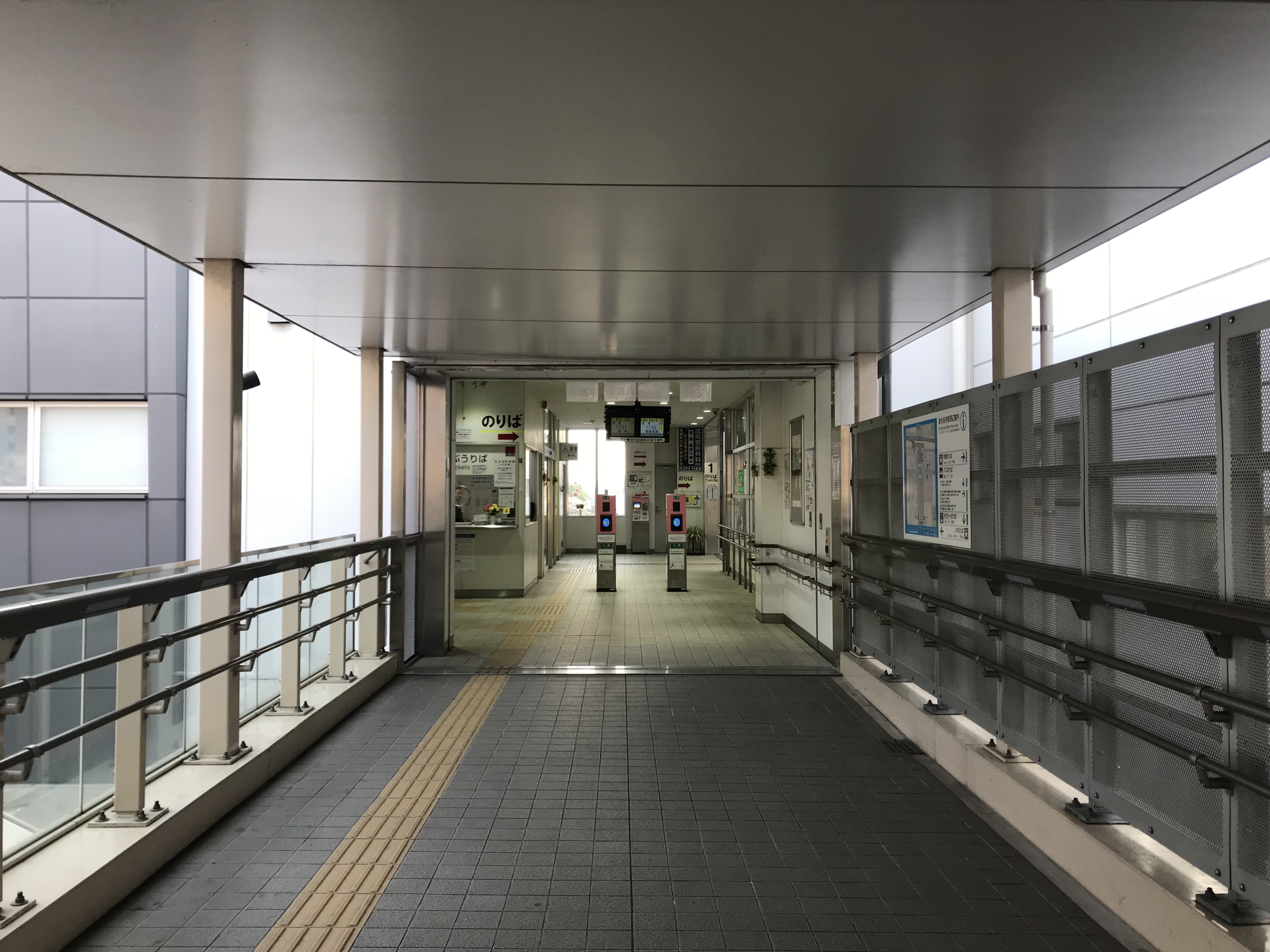
The walkway from the tram stop towards the station lobby. Note the ticket window and the SUGOCA readers.

== History ==
JR Kyushu opened the station on 13 March 1988 as an addition station on the existing track of the Hōhi Main Line.

In 2007 the Kumamoto City authorities initiated work to improve traffic flow around the station. The existing station building at street level was rebuilt as an elevated building on stilts. The Shin-Suizenji-Ekimae tramstop, 150 metres away, was moved 100 metres nearer. Two sheltered flights of step were constructed to connect the tramstop platforms to the railway station building. The new station building and tram stop opened in April 2011.

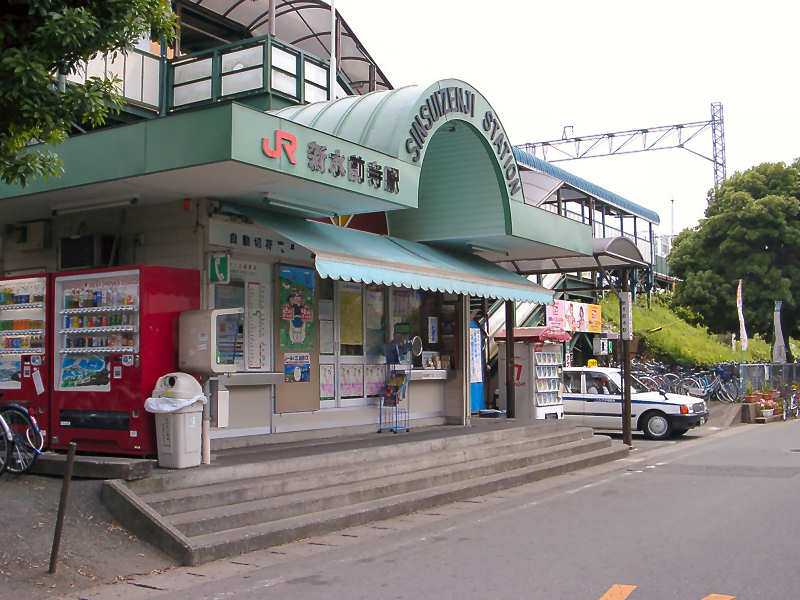
The old station building, at street level. Steps led up to the elevated platform. Picture was taken in 2006.

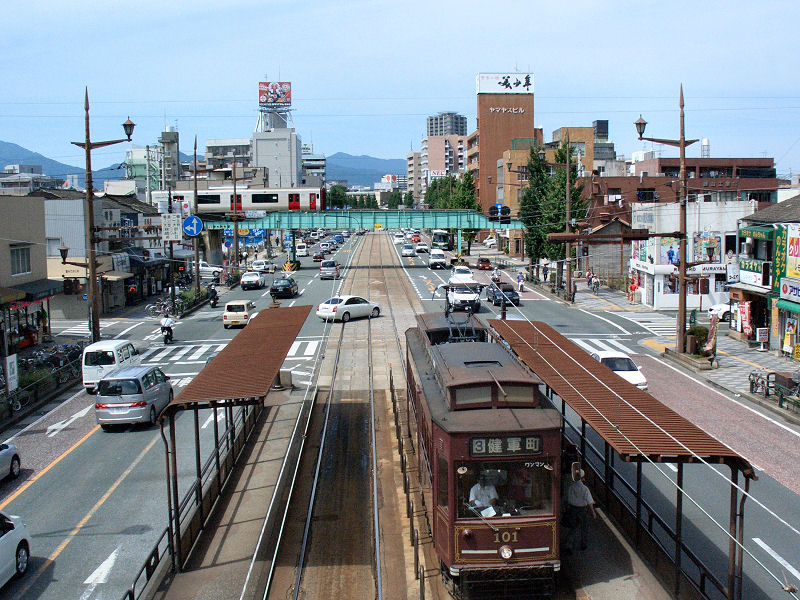
The old tram stop location. The JR station is in the background.

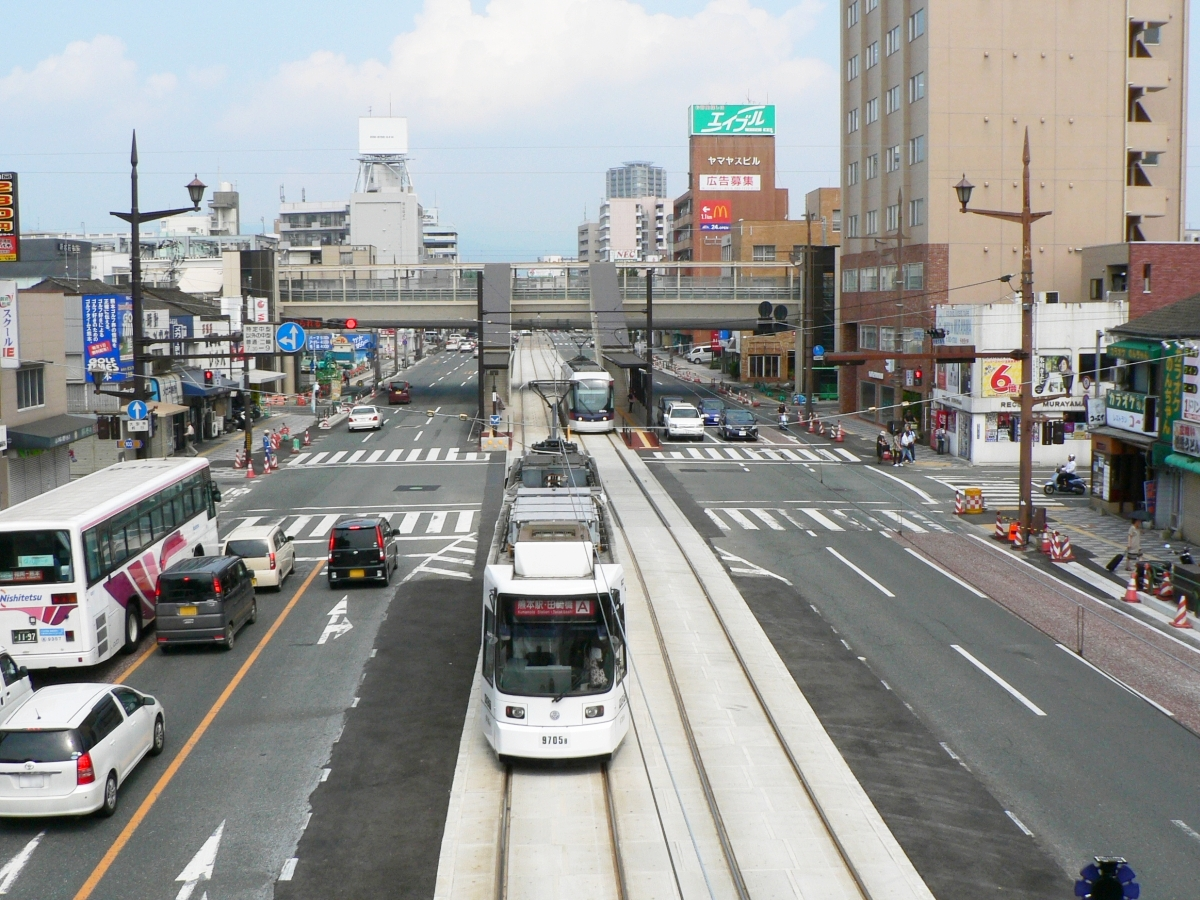
The new tram stop location. The steps leading up to the JR station can be seen.

== Passenger statistics ==
In fiscal 2020, the station was used by an average of 3,882 passengers daily (boarding passengers only), and it ranked 43rd among the busiest stations of JR Kyushu.

== Surrounding area ==
- Kumamoto City Transportation Bureau: Shin-Suizenji-Ekimae Station, A and B-lines
- Kumamoto City Hakusan Elementary School

== See also ==
- List of railway stations in Japan
