= A-Train (JR Kyushu) =

Japanese limited express train service

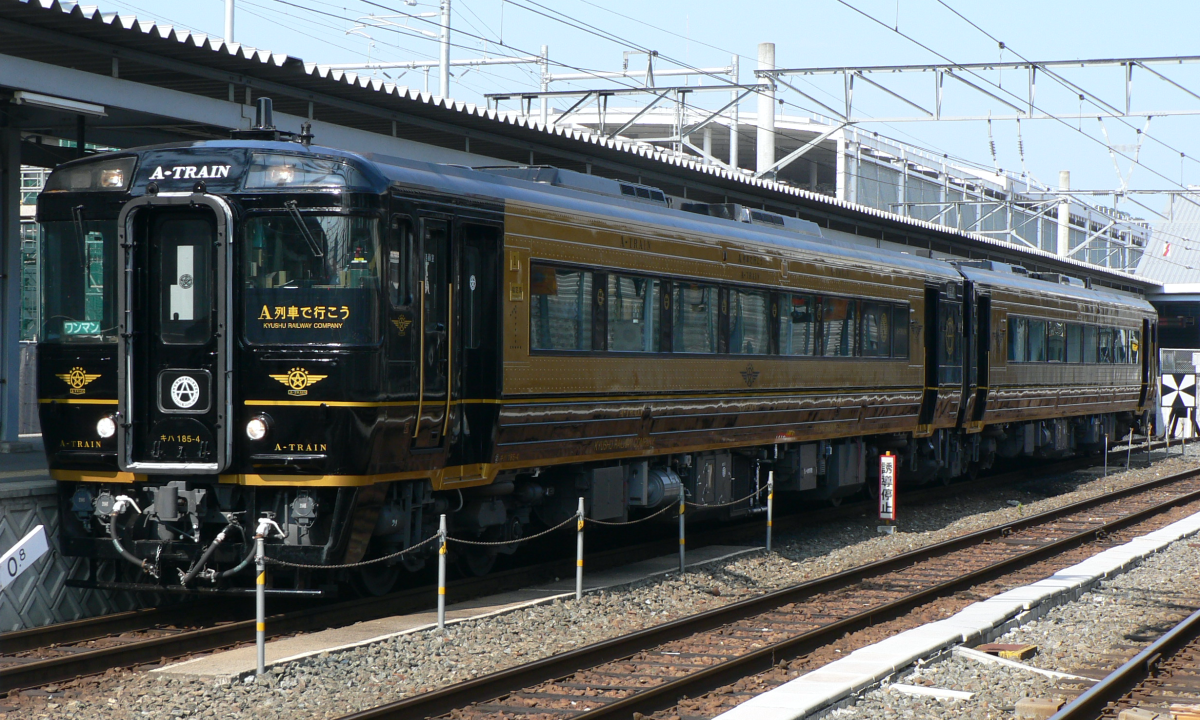
- KiHa 185 series A-Train, October 2011

Overview
- Service type: Limited express
- Status: Operational
- Locale: Kyushu, Japan
- First service: 8 October 2011
- Current operator: JR Kyushu

Route
- Termini: Kumamoto; Misumi
- Lines used: Kagoshima Main Line, Misumi Line

Technical
- Rolling stock: KiHa 185 series DMU
- Track gauge: 1,067 mm (3 ft 6 in)
- Electrification: Diesel
- Operating speed: 110 km/h (70 mph)

The A-Train (A列車で行こう, A ressha de ikō) is a seasonal limited express train service operated by Kyushu Railway Company (JR Kyushu) in Kyushu, Japan, since October 2011.

== Service pattern ==
The service operates between Kumamoto and Misumi, mostly at weekends and holiday periods, with two return workings per day.

The train stops at Uto Station and Ōda Station en route.

== Rolling stock ==
The train is formed of a specially modified 2-car KiHa 185 series diesel multiple unit set (KiHa 185-4 + KiHa 185-1012) which previously operated on Trans-Kyushu Limited Express services. The design concept was overseen by industrial designer Eiji Mitooka.

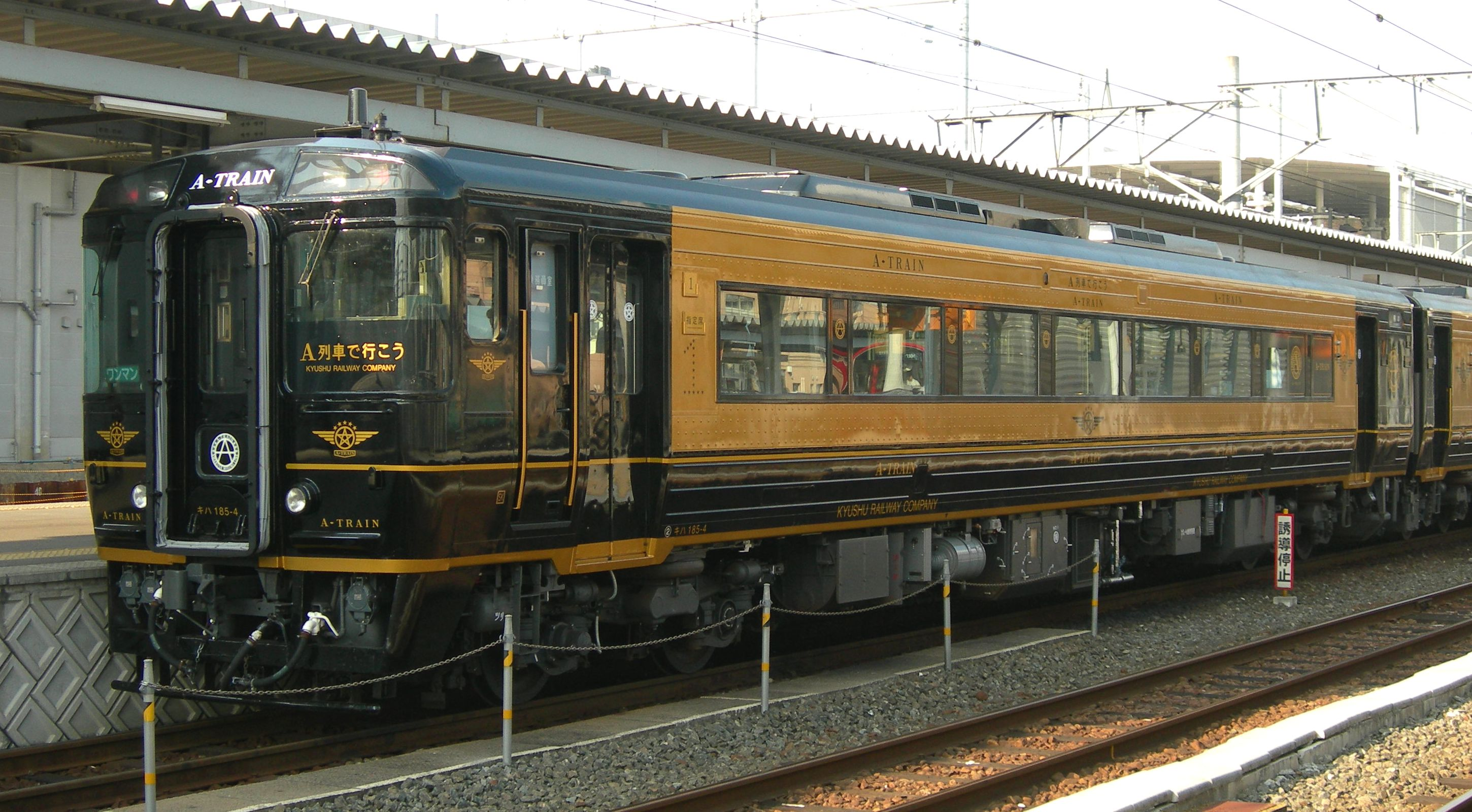
KiHa 185-4 (car 1), October 2011

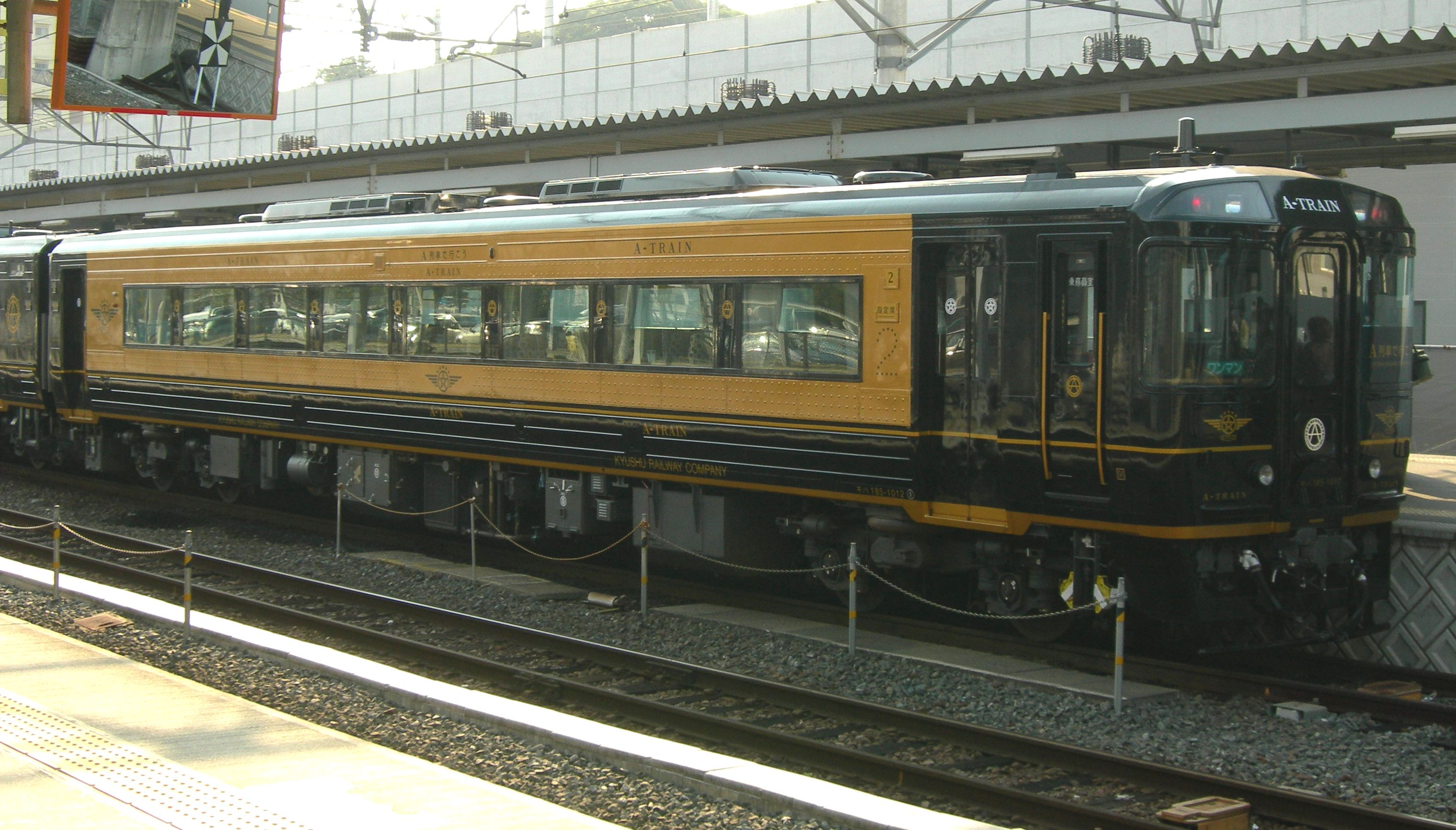
KiHa 185-1012 (car 2), October 2011

== Interior ==
The main seating saloons retain the original 2+2 reclining seats used in the Trans-Kyushu Limited Express, with new seat covers.

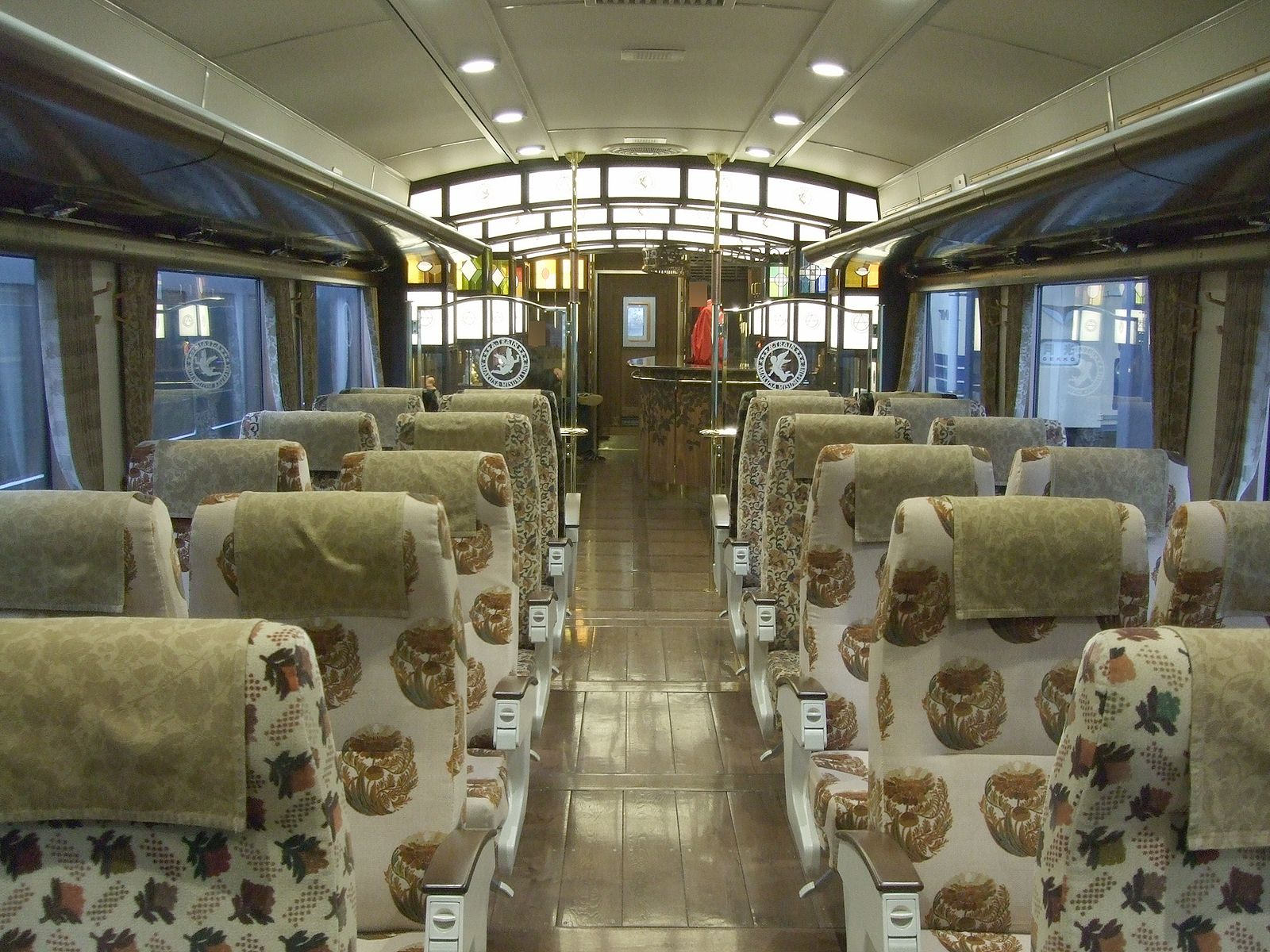
Interior of KiHa 185-4 (car 1)

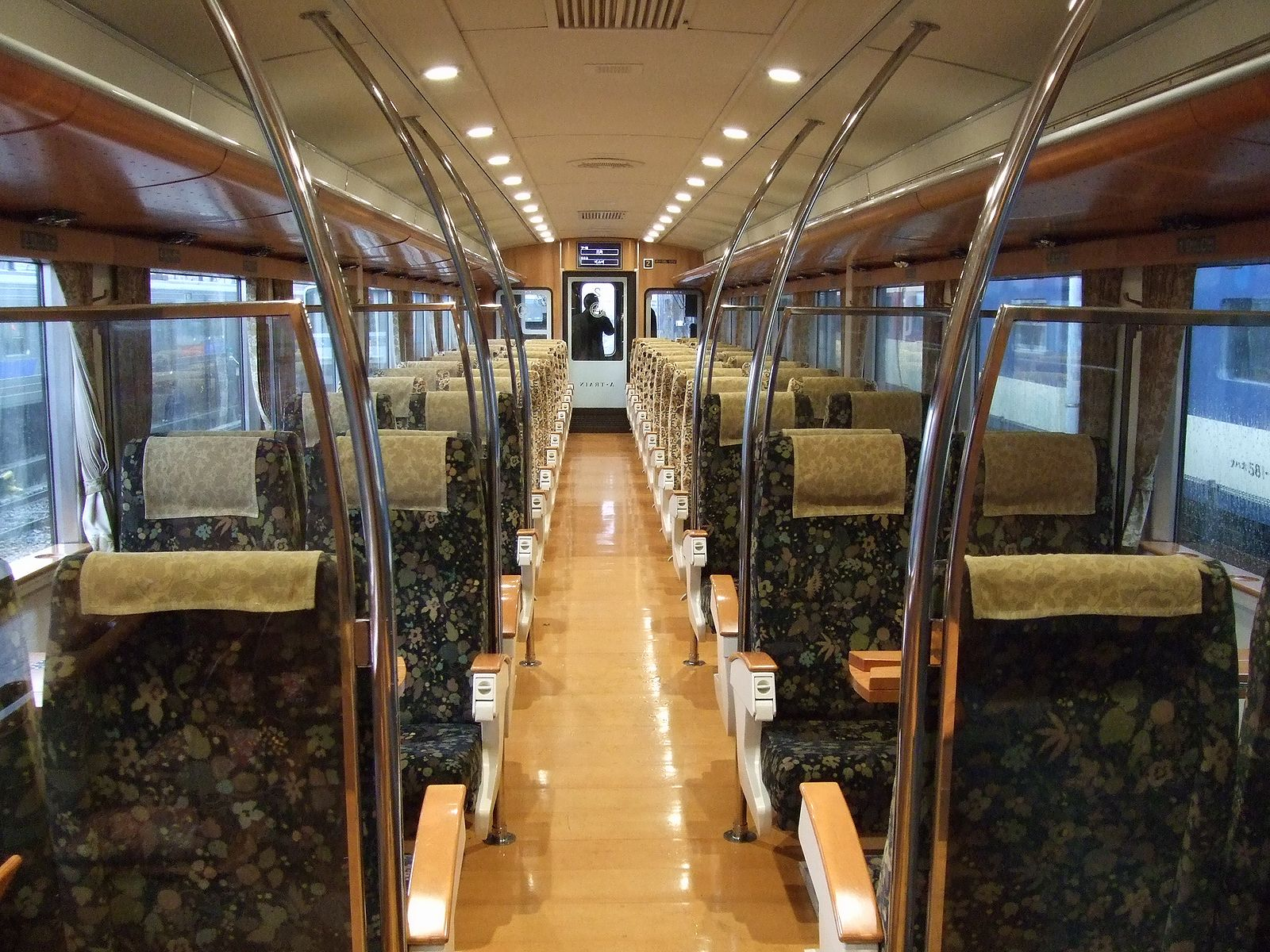
Interior of KiHa 185-1012 (car 2)

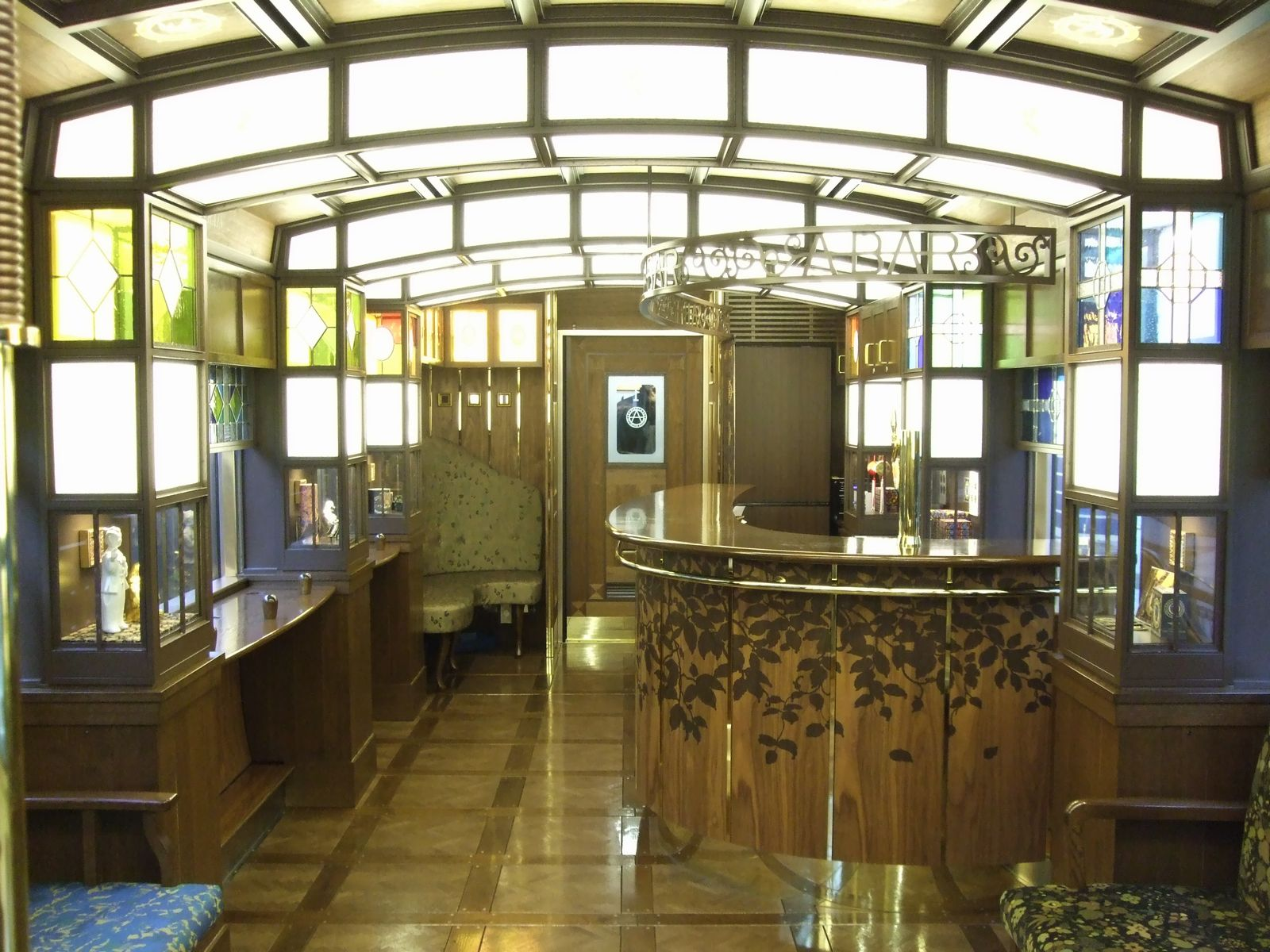
Bar counter in KiHa 185-4 (car 1)

== History ==
The A-Train service was introduced on 8 October 2011. and also named after Kumamoto

== See also ==
- Joyful Train
