= Ishiuchi Dam Station =

Railway station in Uki, Kumamoto Prefecture, Japan

Ishiuchi Dam Station 石打ダム駅
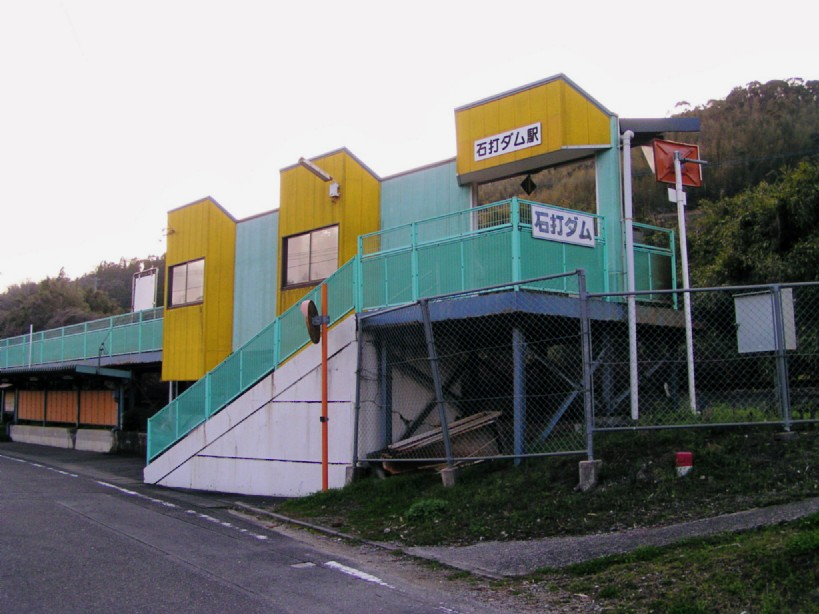
- Ishiuchi Dam Station in March 2005

General information
- Location: Nakamura Misumimachi, Uki-shi, Kumamoto-ken 869-3204; Japan
- Coordinates: 32°38′33.71″N 130°30′25.4″E
- Operator: JR Kyushu
- Line: ■Misumi Line
- Distance: 19.6 km from Uto
- Platforms: 1 side platform
- Tracks: 1

Construction
- Structure type: At-grade
- Accessible: Yes (ramps to platform level)

Other information
- Status: Unstaffed
- Website: Official website

History
- Opened: 11 March 1898

Passengers
- 2009: 21

Services
Preceding station	JR Kyushu	Following station
Akase towards Uto	Misumi Line	Hataura towards Misumi
Location
- Location within Kumamoto Prefecture Location within Japan

Ishiuchi Dam Station (石打ダム駅, Ishiuchi Damu-eki) is a passenger railway station located in the city of Uki, Kumamoto Prefecture, Japan. It is operated by JR Kyushu.

== Lines ==
The station is served by the Misumi Line and is located 19.6 kilometers from the starting point of the line at Uto.

== Layout ==
The station consists of a single side platform serving one track. A simple waiting room is set up on the platform, and passengers enter and exit the station from there. It is an unattended station.

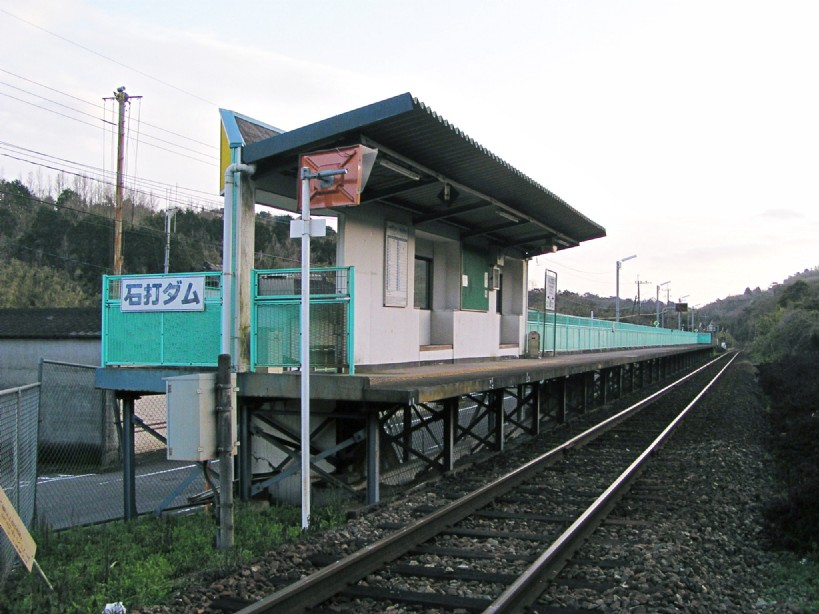
Platform

== History ==
The station was opened on 11 March 1989.

== Surrounding area ==
- Ishiuchi Dam

== See also ==
- List of railway stations in Japan
