= Kawashiri Station =

Railway station in Kumamoto, Japan

Kawashiri Station 川尻駅
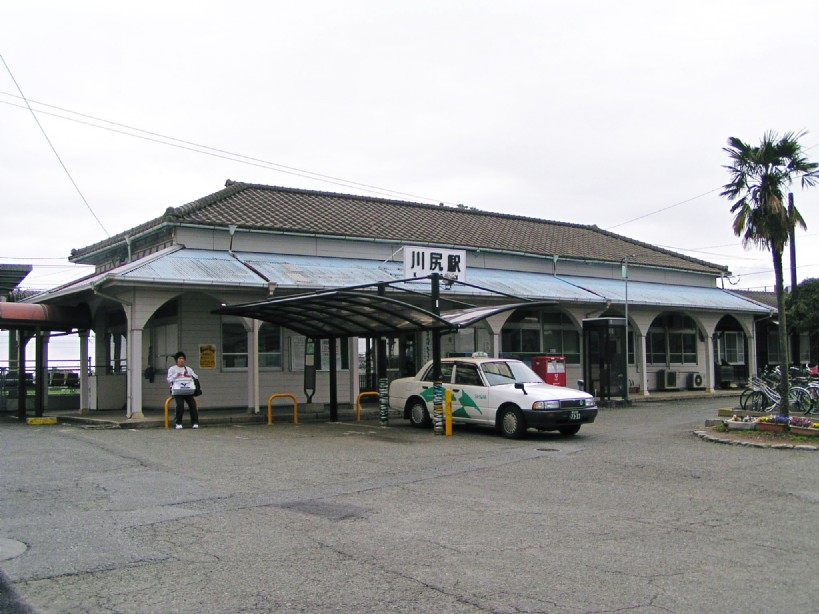
- Kawashiri Station in 2005

General information
- Location: 2-chōme-8 Kawashiri, Minami-ku, Kumamoto-shi, Kumamoto-ken, 861-4115; Japan
- Coordinates: 32°44′37.5″N 130°40′47.8″E
- Operator: JR Kyushu
- Line: ■ Kagoshima Main Line ■Misumi Line
- Distance: 201.9 km from Mojikō
- Platforms: 2 side platforms
- Tracks: 2

Construction
- Structure type: At grade

Other information
- Website: Official website

History
- Opened: 11 August 1894

Passengers
- FY2020: 737 daily
- Rank: 176th (among JR Kyushu stations)

Services
Preceding station	JR Kyushu	Following station
Tomiai towards Kagoshima	Kagoshima Main Line	Nishi-Kumamoto towards Mojikō
Location
- Location within Kumamoto Prefecture Location within Japan

Kawashiri Station (川尻駅, Kawashiri-eki) is a passenger railway station located in the Minami-ku ward of the city of Kumamoto, Kumamoto Prefecture, Japan. It is operated by JR Kyushu.The station was used as a filming location for the 2011 film "I Wish" (Kiseki) by the Japanese director Hirokazu Koreeda.

== Lines ==
The station is served by the Kagoshima Main Line and is located 201.9 km from the starting point of the line at Mojiko. It is also served by most trains of the Misumi Line, which continue past the nominal terminus of that line at Uto to terminate at Kumamoto.

== Layout ==
The station consists of two opposed side platforms serving two tracks at grade, connected by a footbridge. There used to be one side platform and one island platform, but in March 2019, the old platform No. 2 was abolished and the tracks were removed. The only entrance is the east exit, and the station plaza is in front of the east exit.The station building is the second generation, rebuilt in December 1917.

=== Platforms ===
1	■ ■ Kagoshima Main Line	for Yatsushiro
1	■ ■ Misumi Line	for Misumi
2	■ ■ Kagoshima Main Line	for Kumamoto

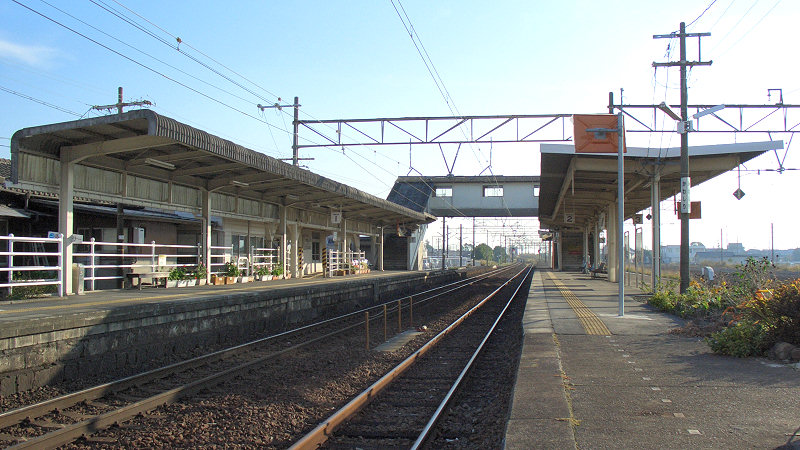
A view of the platforms and tracks

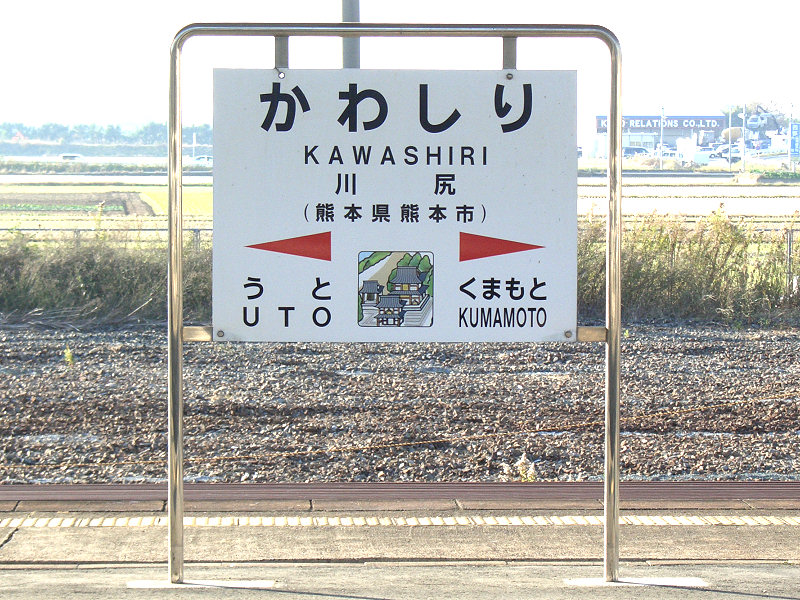
Signage

== History ==
The station opened on 11 August 1894 on the Kyushu Railway, which was nationalized in 1907. Following the privatization of the Japanese National Railways (JNR) on 1 April 1987, the station has been operated by JR Kyushu.

== Passenger statistics ==
In fiscal 2020, the station was used by an average of 737 passengers daily (boarding passengers only), and it ranked 176th among the busiest stations of JR Kyushu.

== Surrounding area ==
- Kumamoto Municipal Kawajiri Elementary School
- Kumamoto Municipal Jonan Junior High School
- Kumamoto Prefectural Kumamoto Agricultural High School

== See also ==
- List of railway stations in Japan
