= Nishi-Kumamoto Station =

Railway station in Kumamoto, Japan

Nishi-Kumamoto Station 西熊本駅
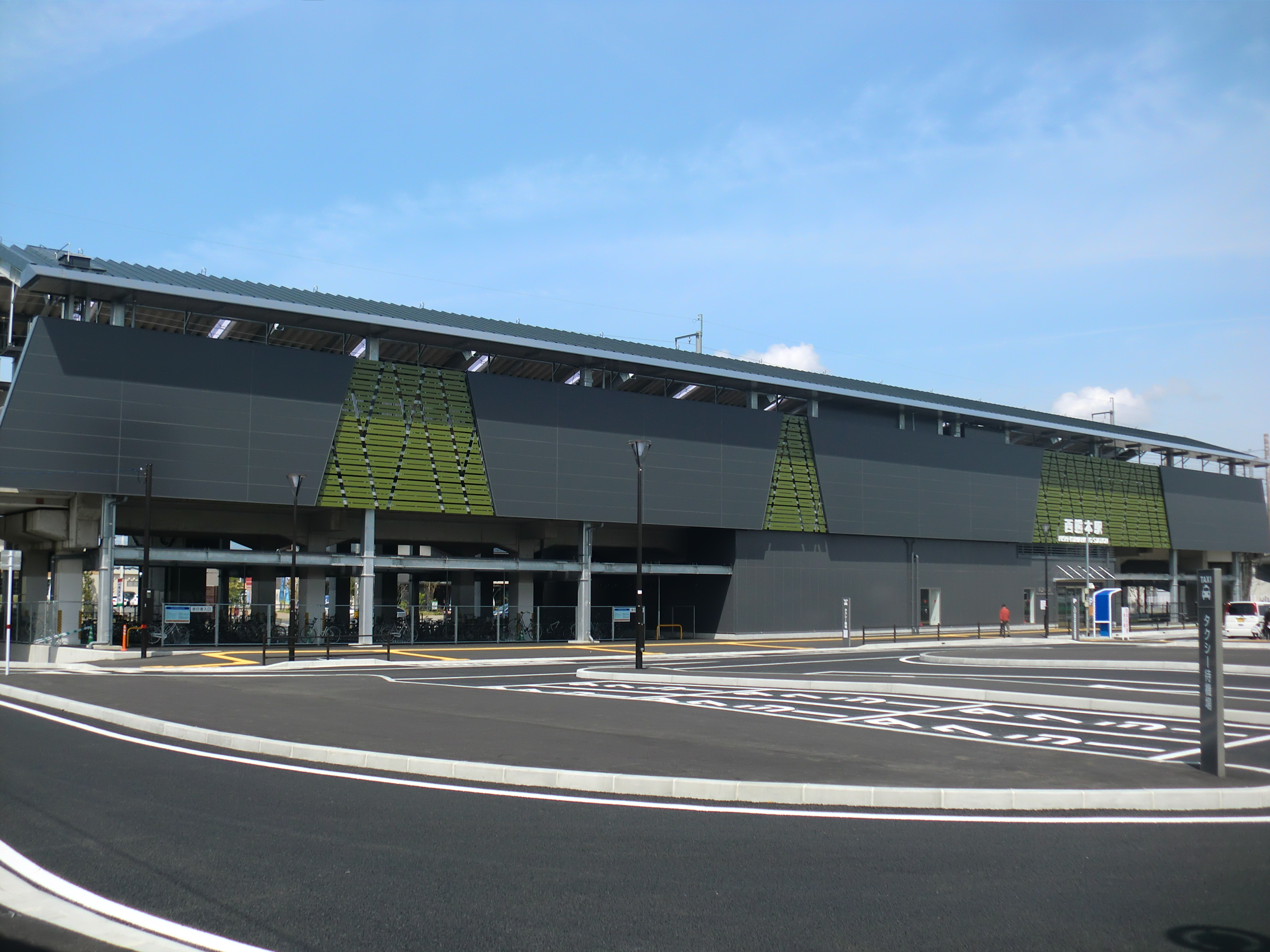
- The station exterior in April 2016

General information
- Location: 1-1-60 Karikusa, Minami-ku, Kumamoto-shi, Kumamoto-ken 861-4134; Japan
- Coordinates: 32°45′46.3″N 130°40′59.0″E
- Operator: JR Kyushu
- Line: ■ Kagoshima Main Line ■Misumi Line
- Distance: 199.8 km from Mojikō
- Platforms: 2 side platforms
- Tracks: 2

Other information
- Status: Unstaffed
- Website: www.jrkyushu.co.jp/EkiApp?LISTID=502&EKI=91301215

History
- Opened: 26 March 2016

Passengers
- FY2020: 973 daily
- Rank: 136th (among JR Kyushu stations)

Services
Preceding station	JR Kyushu	Following station
Kawashiri towards Kagoshima	Kagoshima Main Line	Kumamoto towards Mojikō
Location
- Location within Kumamoto Prefecture Location within Japan

Nishi-Kumamoto Station (西熊本駅, Nishi-Kumamoto-eki) is a passenger railway station located in the Minami-ku ward of the city of Kumamoto, Kumamoto Prefecture, Japan. It is operated by JR Kyushu.

== Lines ==
Nishi-Kumamoto Station is served by the Kagoshima Main Line between Mojiko and Kagoshima, and lies 3.2 km south of Kumamoto Station. It is also served by most trains of the Misumi Line, which continue past the nominal terminus of that line at Uto to terminate at Kumamoto.

== Station layout ==
The station is unstaffed, with ticket barriers on the ground floor level, and the platforms on the second floor level. The platforms are approximately 85 m long, able to handle four-car local trains.

=== Platforms ===
1	■ ■ Kagoshima Main Line	for Kumamoto
2	■ ■ Kagoshima Main Line	for Yatsushiro
2	■ ■ Misumi Line	for Misumi

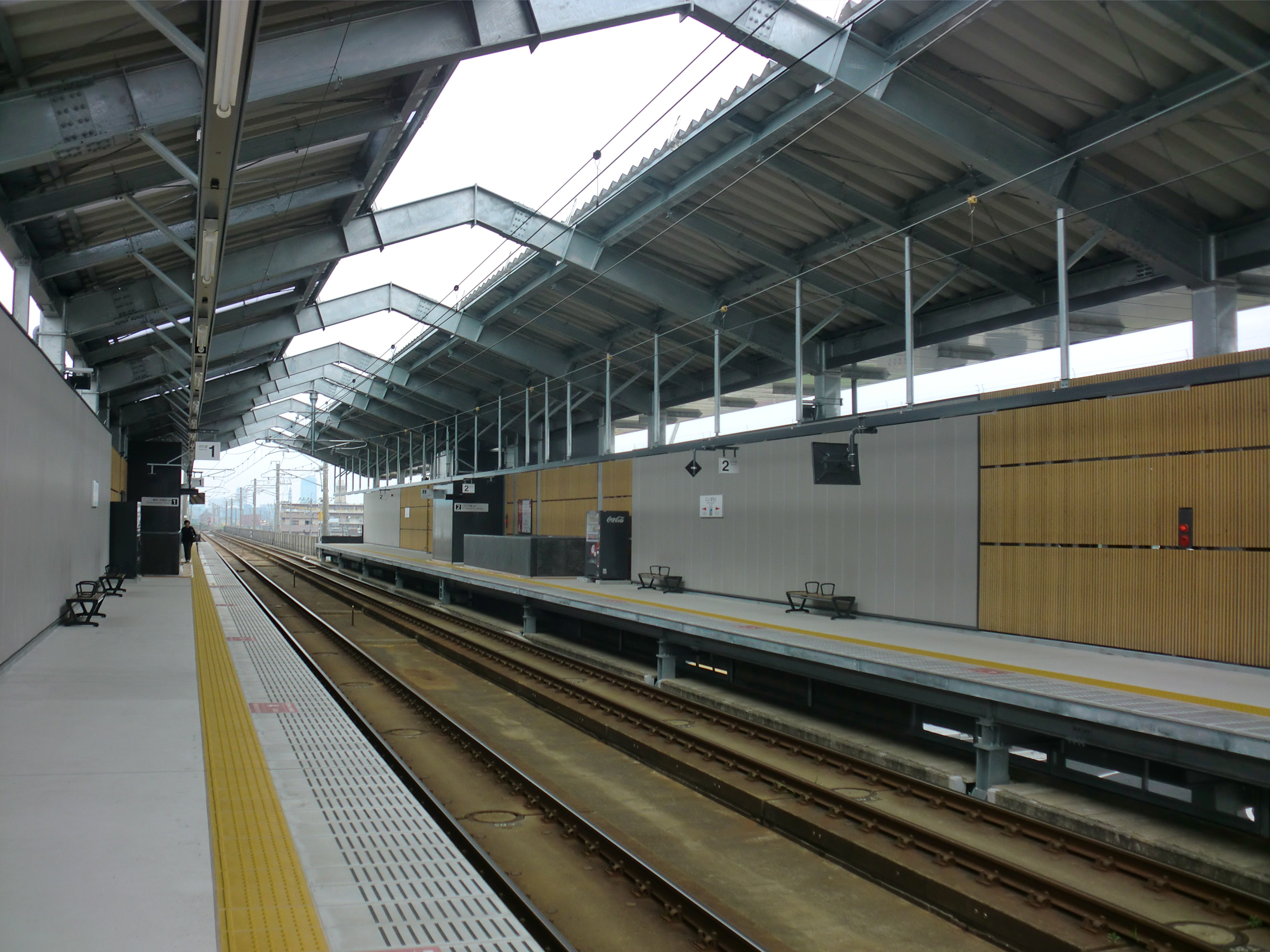
The platforms in June 2016

== History ==
The station was opened on 26 March 2016. A public ballot for the new station name was held between February and March, with the name "Nishi-Kumamoto" officially announced by JR Kyushu on 23 July 2015. Other names suggested in the ballot included Shimo-Kumamoto Station (下熊本駅; lit. "Lower Kumamoto Station"), Chikami Station (近見駅), and Karikusa Station (刈草駅). The total cost of building the station was approximately 1.25 billion yen, funded by the city of Kumamoto, with 380 million yen funded by a national grant.

== Passenger statistics ==
In fiscal 2020, the station was used by an average of 973 passengers daily (boarding passengers only), and it ranked 136th among the busiest stations of JR Kyushu.

== Surrounding area ==
- Aeon Town Nishi-Kumamoto shopping mall
- Rikigo Junior High School
- National Route 3
- National Route 57

== See also ==
- List of railway stations in Japan
