= Higo-Nagahama Station =

Railway station in Uto, Kumamoto Prefecture, Japan

Higo-Nagahama Station 肥後長浜駅
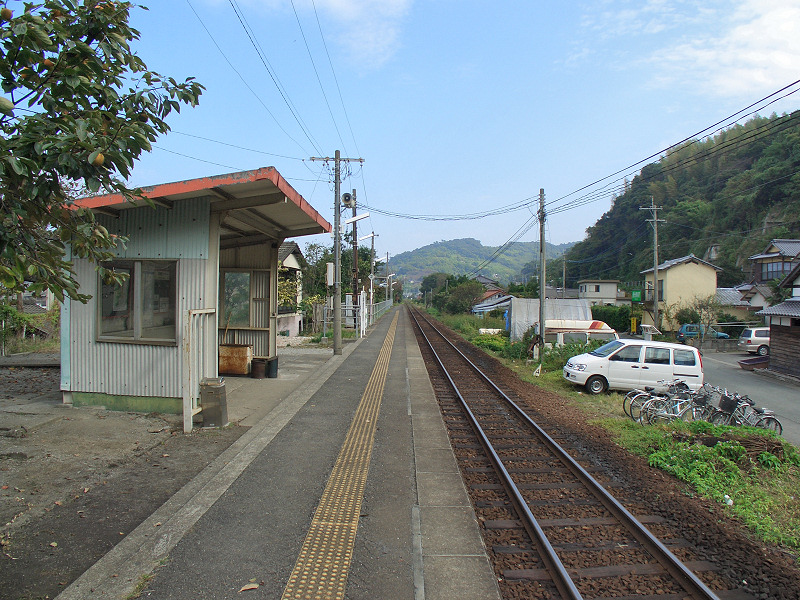
- Higo-Nagahama Station in November 2007

General information
- Location: Japan
- Coordinates: 32°41′26″N 130°33′36″E
- Operator: JR Kyushu
- Line: ■Misumi Line
- Distance: 11.4 km from Uto
- Platforms: 1 side platform
- Tracks: 1

Construction
- Structure type: At-grade
- Accessible: Yes (ramps to platform level)

Other information
- Status: Unstaffed
- Website: Official website

History
- Opened: 17 July 1931

Services
Preceding station	JR Kyushu	Following station
Sumiyoshi towards Uto	Misumi Line	Ōda towards Misumi
Location
- Location within Kumamoto Prefecture Location within Japan

Higo-Nagahama Station (肥後長浜駅, Higo-Nagahama-eki) is a passenger railway station located in the city of Uto, Kumamoto Prefecture, Japan. It is operated by JR Kyushu.

== Lines ==
The station is served by the Misumi Line and is located 11.4 kilometers from the starting point of the line at Uto.

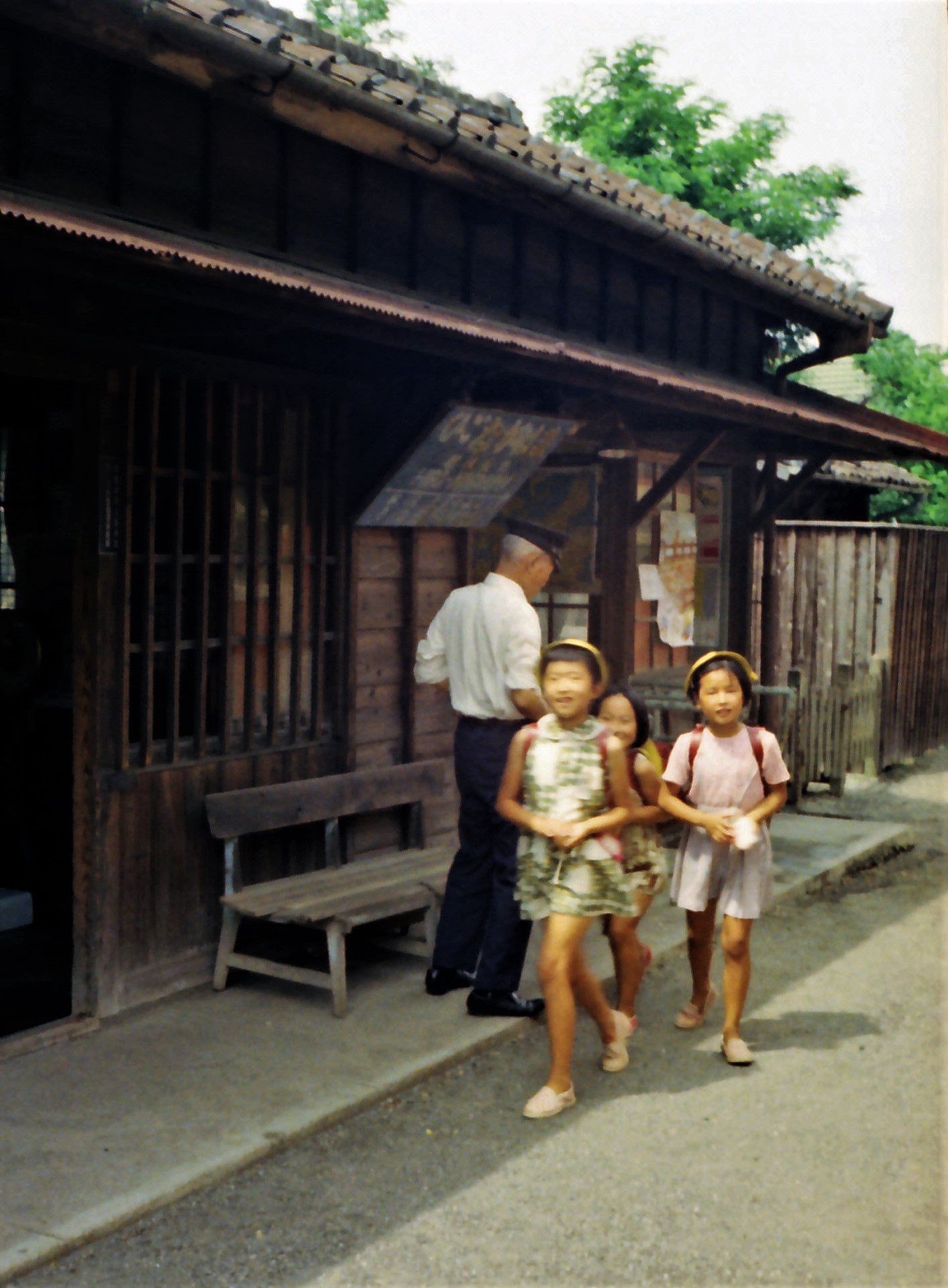
Higo-Nagahama Station in 1971

== Layout ==
The station consists of a single side platform serving one track at grade. There is no station building but only a rain shelter located on the platform and station is unattended.

== History ==
On 17 July 1931 Higo-Nagahama Temporary Stop (肥後長浜仮停留所) was opened by the Japanese Government Railway as a station for beachgoers, open seasonally. It became a full station on 1 January 1939. Following the privatization of the Japan National Railways on April 1, 1987, the station came under the control of JR Kyushu.

== Surrounding area ==
- Japan National Route 57
- Nagahama Beach

== See also ==
- List of railway stations in Japan
