= Ōda Station (Kumamoto) =

Railway station in Uto, Kumamoto Prefecture, Japan

Ōda Station 網田駅
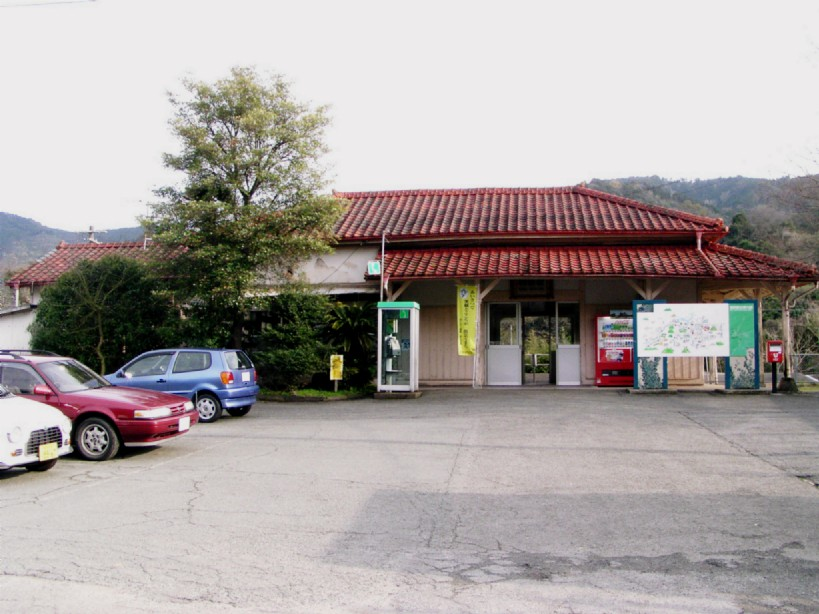
- Ōda Station in March 2005

General information
- Location: Shimoodamachi, Uto-shi, Kumamoto-ken 869-3173; Japan
- Coordinates: 32°40′03″N 130°32′49″E
- Operator: JR Kyushu
- Line: ■Misumi Line
- Distance: 14.5 km from Uto
- Platforms: 2 side platforms
- Tracks: 1

Construction
- Structure type: At-grade
- Accessible: Yes (ramps to platform level)

Other information
- Status: Staffed
- Website: Official website

History
- Opened: 25 December 1899

Passengers
- FY2005: 193

Services
Preceding station	JR Kyushu	Following station
Higo-Nagahama towards Uto	Misumi Line	Akase towards Misumi
Location
- Location within Kumamoto Prefecture Location within Japan

Ōda Station (網田駅, Ōda-eki) is a passenger railway station located in the city of Uto, Kumamoto Prefecture, Japan. It is operated by JR Kyushu.

== Lines ==
The station is served by the Misumi Line and is located 14.5 kilometers from the starting point of the line at Uto. The A-Train limited express also makes a brief stop at this station.

== Layout ==
The station consists of two opposed side platforms at grade connected by a level crossing. The wooden station building bookstore is the oldest station building in Kumamoto Prefecture and received protection by the national government as a Registered Tangible Cultural Property in 2014.

=== Platforms ===
1	■ Misumi Line	for Uto and Kumamoto
2	■ Misumi Line	for Misumi

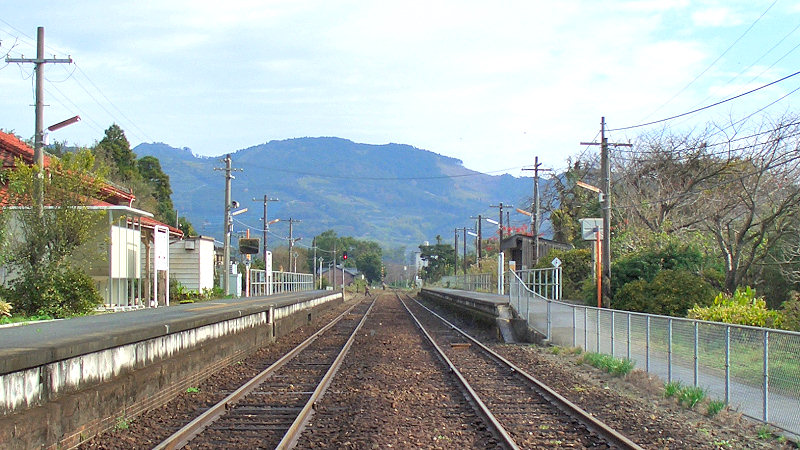
Platforms

== History ==
The station was opened on 25 December 1899 by the Kyushu Railway, which was nationalized on 1 July 1907. Following the privatization of the Japan National Railways on April 1, 1987, the station came under the control of JR Kyushu.

== Passenger statistics ==
In fiscal 2005, the station was used by an average of 193 passengers daily (boarding passengers only).

== Surrounding area ==
- Uto City Hall Amida Branch Office
- Uto City Amida Elementary School
- Uto City Amida Junior High School
- Japan National Route 57

== See also ==
- List of railway stations in Japan
