= Tomiai Station =

Railway station in Kumamoto, Japan

Tomiai Station 富合駅
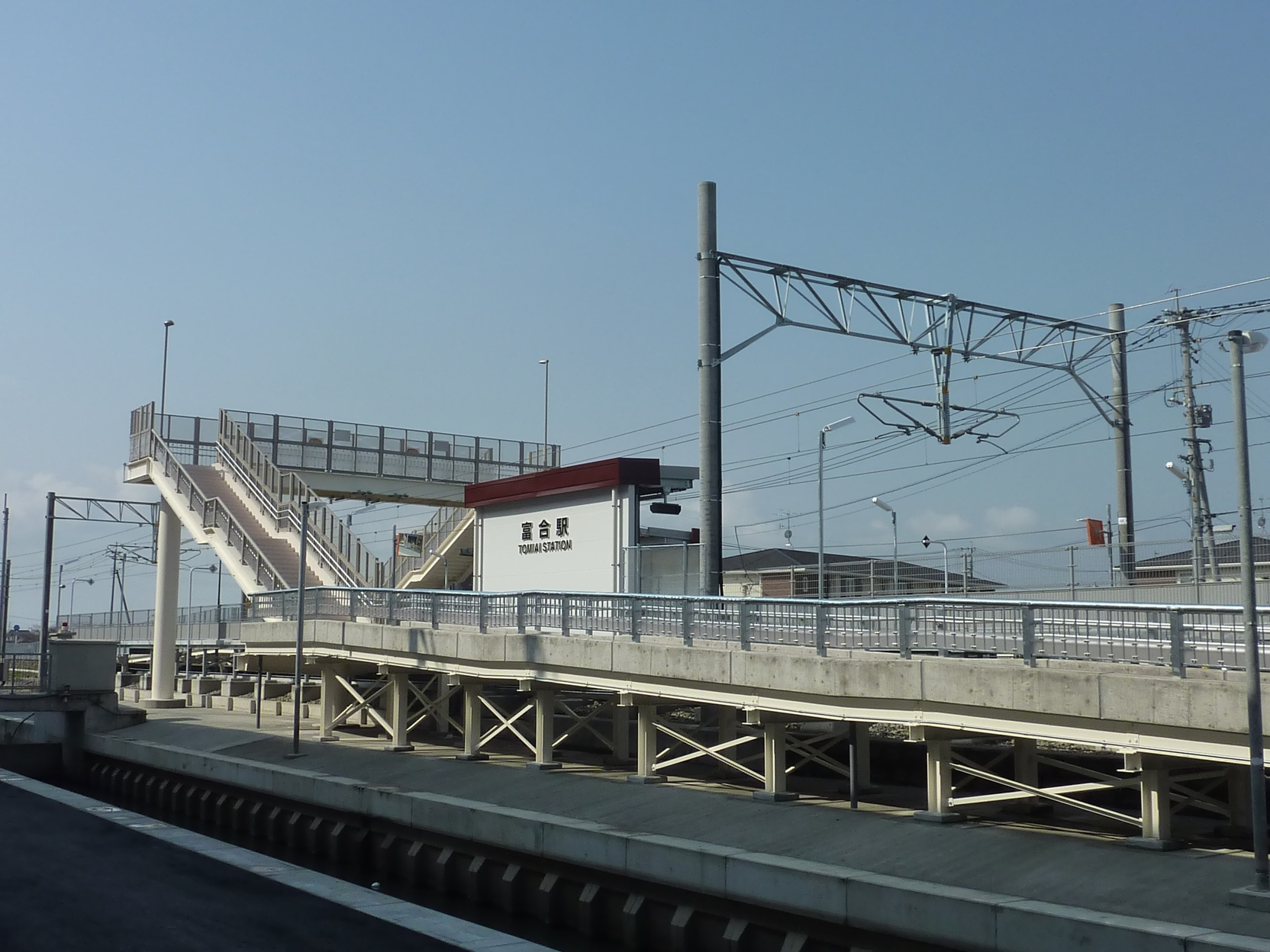
- Tomiai Station in March 2011

General information
- Location: Tomiaimachi Shijimizu, Minami-ku, Kumamoto-shi, Kumamoto-ken 861-4163; Japan
- Coordinates: 32°42′49″N 130°40′22″E
- Operator: JR Kyushu
- Line: ■ Kagoshima Main Line ■Misumi Line
- Distance: 205.3 km from Mojikō
- Platforms: 2 island platforms
- Tracks: 2

Construction
- Structure type: At grade

Other information
- Website: Official website

History
- Opened: 12 March 2011

Passengers
- FY2020: 500 daily
- Rank: 216th (among JR Kyushu stations)

Services
Preceding station	JR Kyushu	Following station
Uto towards Kagoshima	Kagoshima Main Line	Kawashiri towards Mojikō
Location
- Location within Kumamoto Prefecture Location within Japan

Tomiai Station (富合駅, Tomiai-eki) is a passenger railway station located in the Minami-ku ward of the city of Kumamoto, Kumamoto Prefecture, Japan. It is operated by JR Kyushu.

== Lines ==
The station is served by the Kagoshima Main Line and is located 205.3 km from the starting point of the line at Mojiko. It is also served by most trains of the Misumi Line, which continue past the nominal terminus of that line at Uto to terminate at Kumamoto.

== Layout ==
The station consists of two opposed side platforms serving two tracks at grade, connected by a footbridge. The station building is unattended.

=== Platforms ===
1	■ ■ Kagoshima Main Line	for Kumamoto
2	■ ■ Kagoshima Main Line	for Yatsushiro
2	■ ■ Misumi Line	for Misumi

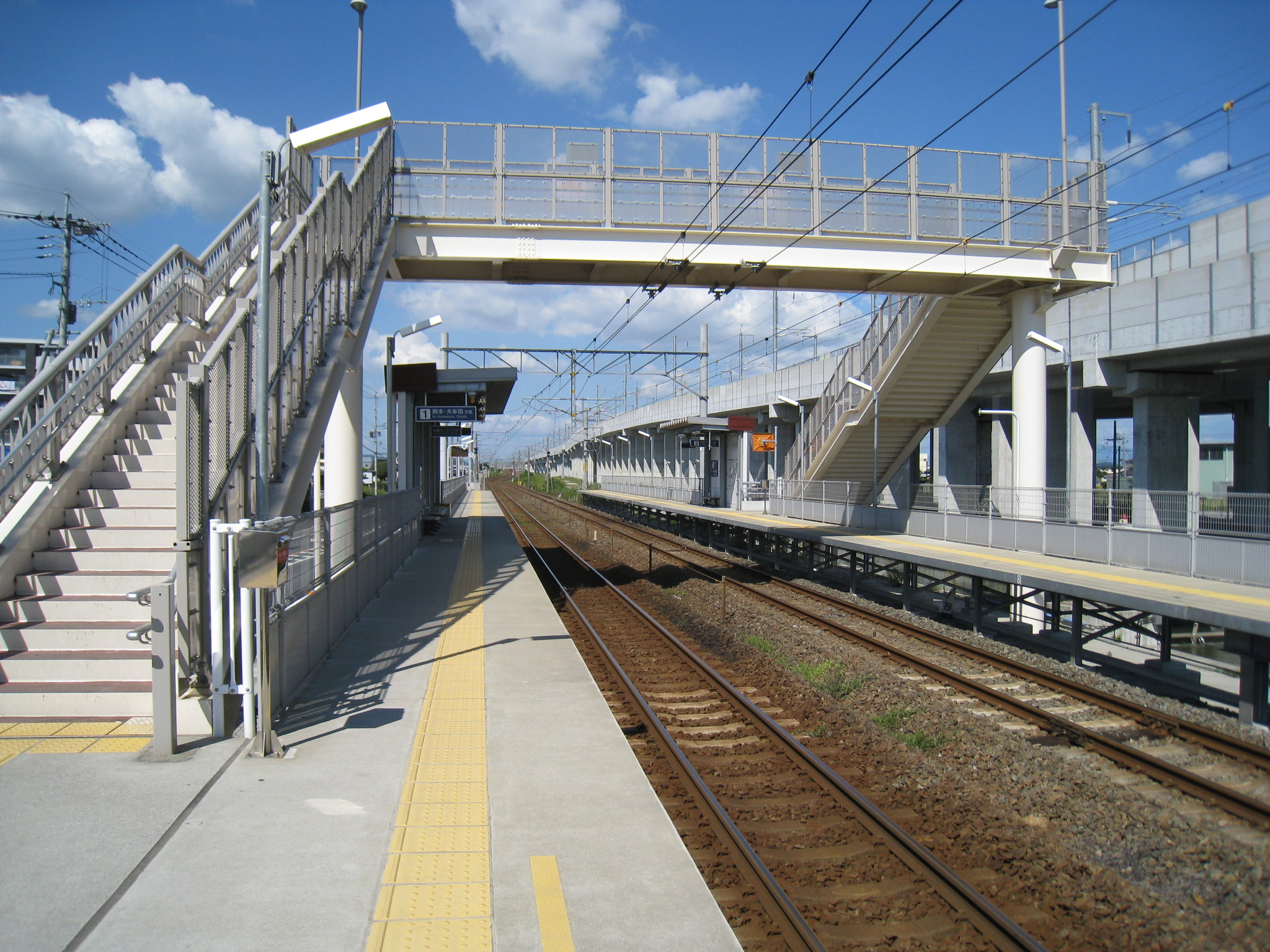
A view of the platforms and tracks.

== History ==
The station opened on March 12, 2011. The name of the station was officially announced by JR Kyushu on December 17, 2010.

== Passenger statistics ==
In fiscal 2020, the station was used by an average of 500 passengers daily (boarding passengers only), and it ranked 216th among the busiest stations of JR Kyushu.

== See also ==
- List of railway stations in Japan

== Surrounding area ==
- Tomiai Elementary School
- Japan National Route 3
