= Akase Station =

Railway station in Uto, Kumamoto Prefecture, Japan

Akase Station 赤瀬駅
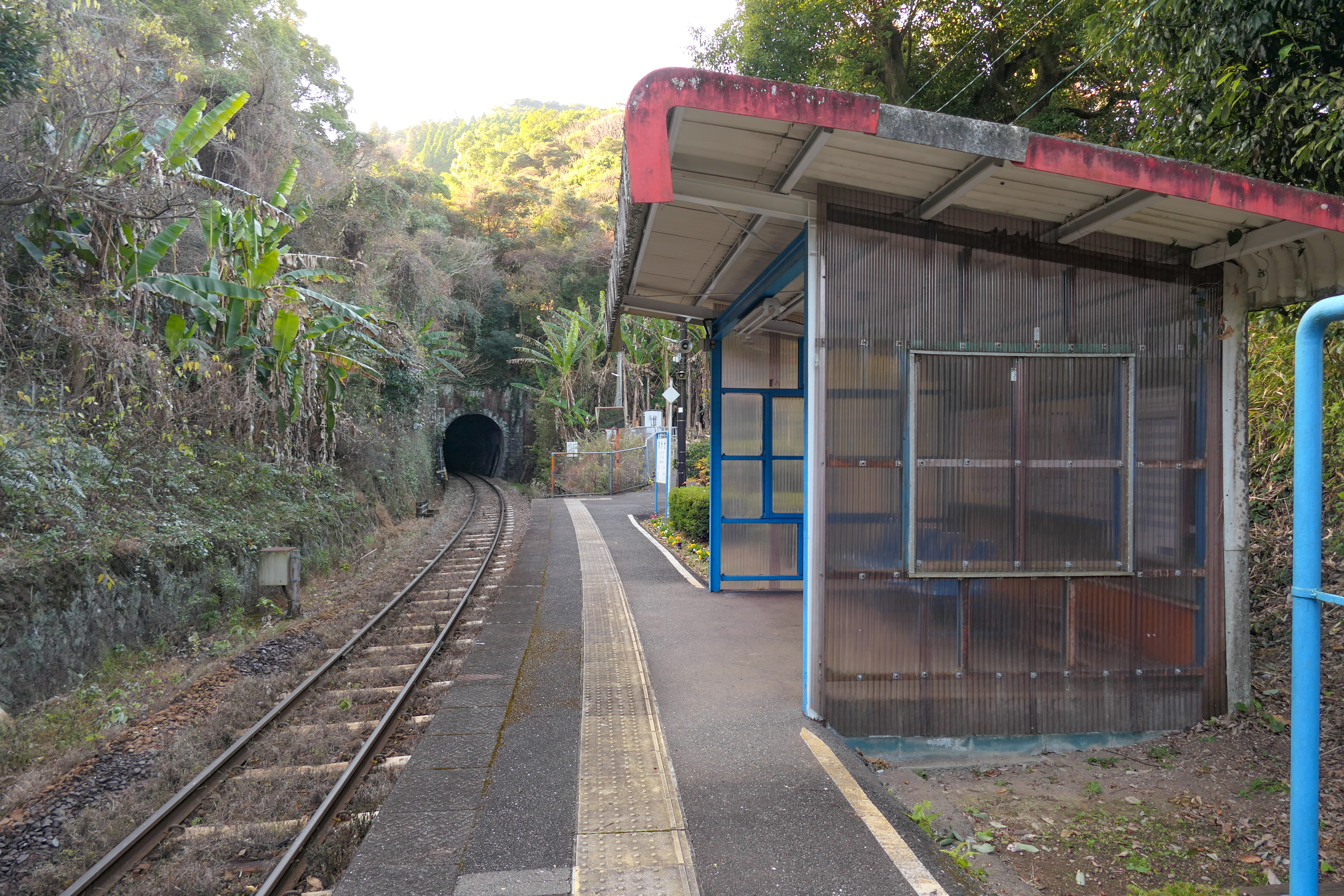
- Akase Station in 2022

General information
- Location: Akasemachi, Uto-shi, Kumamoto-ken 869-3175; Japan
- Coordinates: 32°39′12.00″N 130°30′36.01″E
- Operator: JR Kyushu
- Line: ■Misumi Line
- Distance: 18.4 km from Uto
- Platforms: 1 side platform
- Tracks: 1

Construction
- Structure type: At grade
- Accessible: Yes (ramps to platform level)

Other information
- Status: Unstaffed
- Website: Official website

History
- Opened: 5 August 1907

Services
Preceding station	JR Kyushu	Following station
Ōda towards Uto	Misumi Line	Ishiuchi Dam towards Misumi
Location
- Location within Kumamoto Prefecture Location within Japan

Akase Station (赤瀬駅, Akase-eki) is a passenger railway station located in the city of Uto, Kumamoto Prefecture, Japan. It is operated by JR Kyushu.

== Lines ==
The station is served by the Misumi Line and is located 18.4 kilometers from the starting point of the line at Uto.

== Layout ==
The station consists of a single side platform serving one track at grade. The station building has already been removed, leaving only the platform and waiting room.

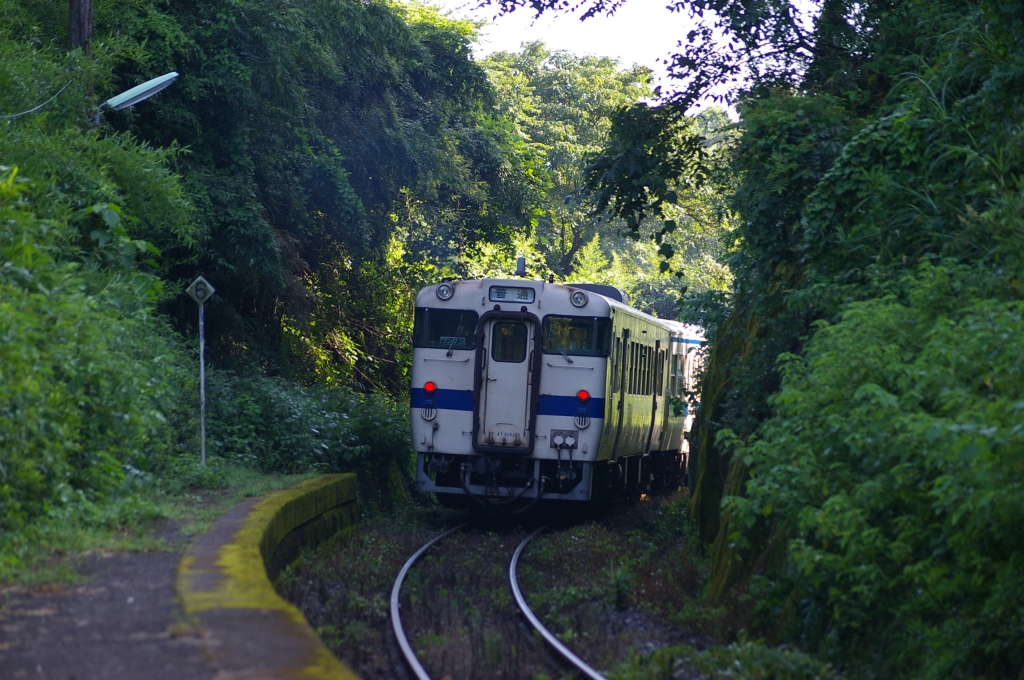
Train departing Akase Station

== History ==
On 5 August 1907 Akase Temporary Stop (赤瀬簡易停車場) was opened by the Japanese Government Railway as a station for beachgoers, open seasonally. It became a temporary station in 1909 and was elevated to a full station on January 1, 1941. Following the privatization of the Japan National Railways on April 1, 1987, the station came under the control of JR Kyushu.

== Surrounding area ==
This station is famous for being a secluded station.

- Japan National Route 57

== See also ==
- List of railway stations in Japan
