= Sumiyoshi Station (Kumamoto) =

Railway station in Uto, Kumamoto Prefecture, Japan

Sumiyoshi Station 住吉駅
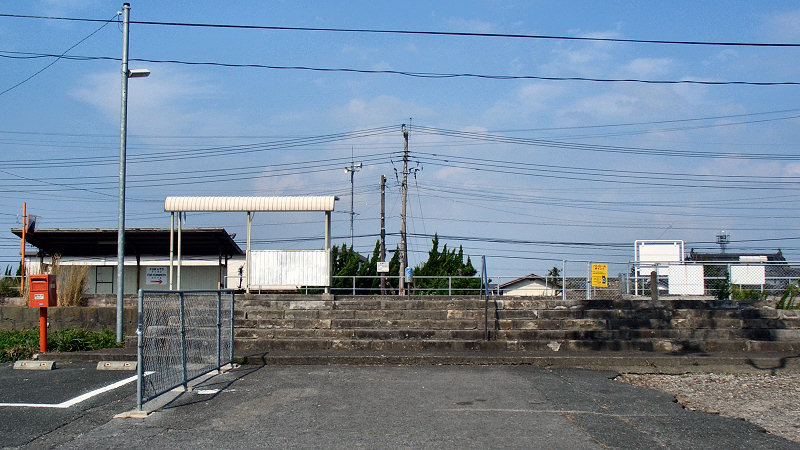
- Sumiyoshi Station in October 2006

General information
- Location: Sumiyoshimachi, Uto-shi, Kumamoto-ken 869-0401; Japan
- Coordinates: 32°42′07″N 130°35′52″E
- Operator: JR Kyushu
- Line: ■Misumi Line
- Distance: 7.2 km from Uto
- Platforms: 2 side platforms
- Tracks: 2

Construction
- Structure type: At-grade
- Accessible: Yes (ramps to platform level)

Other information
- Status: Unstaffed
- Website: Official website

History
- Opened: 25 December 1899

Services
Preceding station	JR Kyushu	Following station
Midorikawa towards Uto	Misumi Line	Higo-Nagahama towards Misumi
Location
- Location within Kumamoto Prefecture Location within Japan

Sumiyoshi Station (住吉駅, Sumiyoshi-eki) is a passenger railway station located in the city of Uto, Kumamoto Prefecture, Japan. It is operated by JR Kyushu.

== Lines ==
The station is served by the Misumi Line and is located 7.2 kilometers from the starting point of the line at Uto.

== Layout ==
The station consists of two opposed side platforms connected by a level crossing. There used to be a wooden station building, but it was destroyed in a typhoon and was removed. Each platform has a waiting room, and the platform for Kumamoto has an automatic ticket vending machine.

=== Platforms ===
1	■ Misumi Line	for Misumi
2	■ Misumi Line	for Uto and Kumamoto

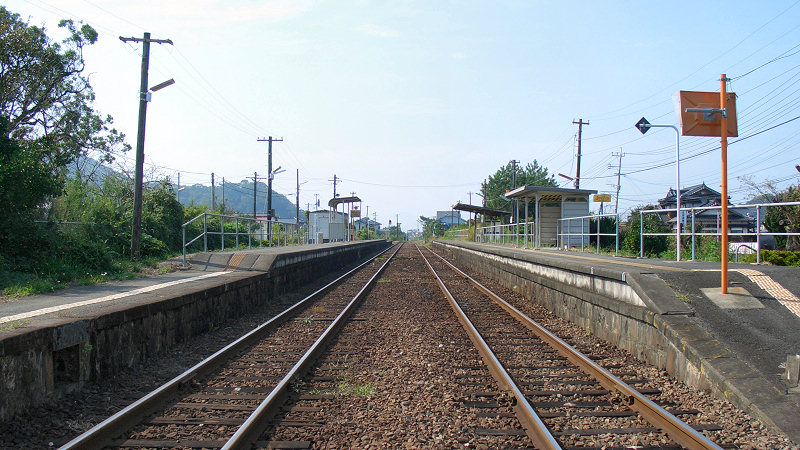
Platforms

== History ==
Sumiyoshi Station was opened by the Japanese Government Railway on 25 December 1899. The line was nationalized in 1907. Following the privatization of the Japan National Railways on April 1, 1987, the station came under the control of JR Kyushu.

== Surrounding area ==
- Japan National Route 57

== See also ==
- List of railway stations in Japan
