= Midorikawa =

Midorikawa is a Japanese surname. Notable people with the name include:

- Hikaru Midorikawa (born 1968), Japanese voice actor
- Yōichi Midorikawa (1915–2001), Japanese photographer
- Yuki Midorikawa (born 1976), Japanese manga artist

== Fictional ==
- Hana Midorikawa, secretary of the Underground Student Council from the manga/anime series Prison School.
- Nao Midorikawa, civilian identity of Cure March from the anime series Smile PreCure!
  - Tomoko and Genji Midorikawa, Nao's parents
  - Keita, Haru, Hina, Yuuta, Kouta, and Yui Midorikawa, Nao's younger siblings
- Retasu Midorikawa, civilian identity of Mew Lettuce from the manga/anime series Tokyo Mew Mew
- Ruruiko Midorikawa, SHOCKER associate from the film Shin Kamen Rider
- Takumi Midorikawa, captain of the Hatsushiba Clan featured in Yakuza 4.

== See also ==
- Midorikawa Station, Railway station on the Misumi Line, operated by Kyushu Railway Company in Uto, Kumamoto, Japan
