= Hataura Station =

Railway station in Uki, Kumamoto Prefecture, Japan

Hataura Station 波多浦駅
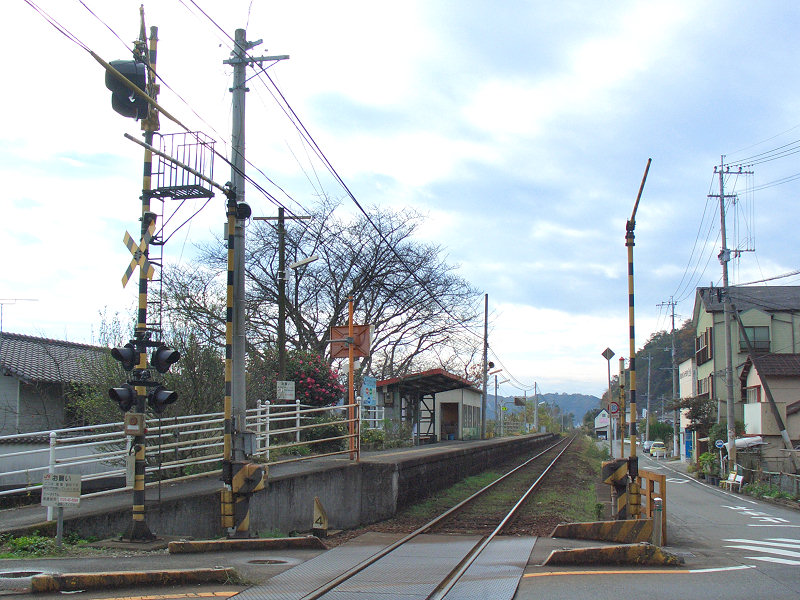
- Hataura Station in December 2006

General information
- Location: Hata Misumimachi, Uki-shi, Kumamoto-ken 869-3205; Japan
- Coordinates: 32°36′57.02″N 130°29′18.32″E
- Operator: JR Kyushu
- Line: ■Misumi Line
- Distance: 23.5 km from Uto
- Platforms: 1 side platform
- Tracks: 1

Construction
- Structure type: At-grade
- Accessible: Yes (ramps to platform level)

Other information
- Status: Unstaffed
- Website: Official website

History
- Opened: 25 December 1959

Passengers
- FY2009: 404

Services
Preceding station	JR Kyushu	Following station
Ishiuchi Dam towards Uto	Misumi Line	Misumi Terminus
Location
- Location within Kumamoto Prefecture Location within Japan

Hataura Station (波多浦駅, Hataura-eki) is a passenger railway station located in the city of Uki, Kumamoto Prefecture, Japan. It is operated by JR Kyushu.

== Lines ==
The station is served by the Misumi Line and is located 23.5 kilometers from the starting point of the line at Uto.

== Layout ==
The station consists of a single side platform serving one track at grade. It is an unattended station with no station building, only two waiting rooms on the platform.

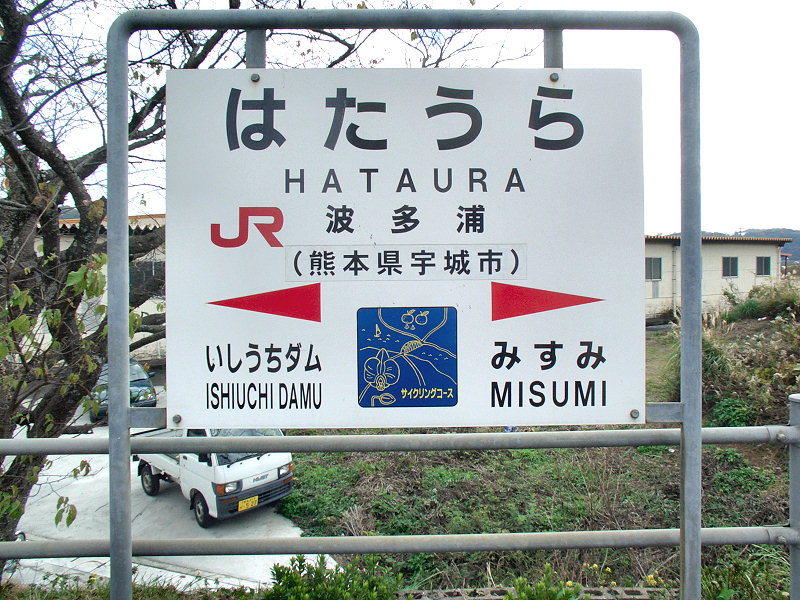
Signage

== History ==
Hataura Station was opened on 25 December 1959 by Japanese National Railways. In 1987 the station came under the jurisdiction of JR Kyushu.

== Surrounding area ==
- Uki City Misumi Junior High School
- Saiseikai Misumi Hospital

== See also ==
- List of railway stations in Japan
