= Trans-Kyushu Limited Express =

Japanese limited express train service

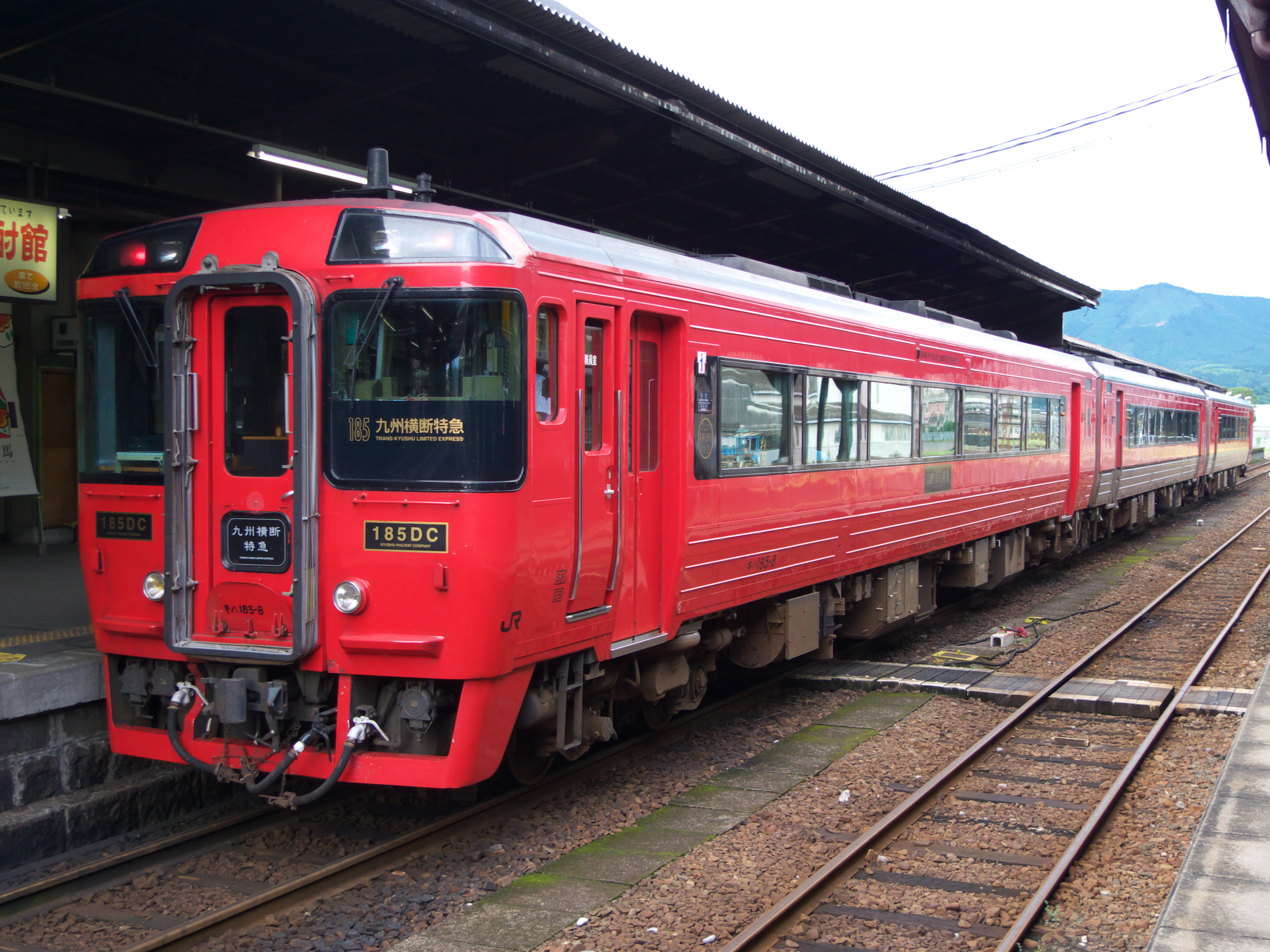
- KiHa 185 series Trans-Kyushu Limited Express DMU at Hitoyoshi Station, September 2010

Overview
- Service type: Limited express
- Status: Operational
- First service: 13 March 2004
- Current operator: JR Kyushu

Route
- Termini: Kumamoto; Beppu
- Stops: 17
- Distance travelled: 160.1 km (99.5 mi)
- Average journey time: 3 hours approx
- Service frequency: 2 return workings daily
- Lines used: Hōhi Main Line, Nippō Main Line

On-board services
- Class: Standard only
- Disabled access: Yes
- Sleeping arrangements: None
- Catering facilities: None
- Observation facilities: None
- Entertainment facilities: None
- Other facilities: Toilets

Technical
- Rolling stock: KiHa 185 series DMU
- Electrification: None
- Operating speed: 100 km/h (62 mph)
- Track owner: JR Kyushu

The Trans-Kyushu Limited Express (九州横断特急, Kyūshū Ōdan Tokkyū) is a limited express train service in Japan operated by Kyushu Railway Company (JR Kyushu) which runs between Beppu and Kumamoto, via Aso.

== Rolling stock ==
- KiHa 185 series DMU: 1992–present

== History ==
The Trans-Kyushu Limited Express was introduced from 13 March 2004.

== See also ==
- List of named passenger trains of Japan
- Joyful Train
