= Todoroki Shell Mound =

Todoroki Shell Midden
- 轟貝塚 (Japanese)
- Todoroki Shell Midden Todoroki Shell Mound (Japan)
- Interactive map of Todoroki Shell Midden
- 32°40′48″N 130°38′27″E
- Type: shell midden
- Periods: Jōmon period
- Location: Uto, Kumamoto, Japan
- Region: Kyushu

Site notes
- Public access: Yes (no facilities at site)

The Todororoki Shell Midden (轟貝塚, Todororoki kaizuka) is an archaeological site in what is now the Miyanosho-cho neighborhood of the city of Uto, Kumamoto Prefecture, Japan with an early Jōmon period shell midden. The site was designated a National Historic Site in 2022 by the Japanese government.

== Overview ==
During the early to middle Jōmon period (approximately 4000 to 2500 BC), sea levels were five to six meters higher than at present, and the ambient temperature was also 2 deg C higher. During this period, Kyushu was inhabited by the Jōmon people, many of whom lived in coastal settlements. The middens associated with such settlements contain bone, botanical material, mollusc shells, sherds, lithics, and other artifacts and ecofacts associated with the now-vanished inhabitants, and these features, provide a useful source into the diets and habits of Jōmon society. Most of these middens are found along the Pacific coast of Japan; however, this site is located at the edge of a low plateau at the base of the Uto Peninsula., facing the Ariake Sea.

The Nishiokadai portion of the shell mound has been excavated four times from 1919 to 1966. It consists mainly of oysters, cockles, and short-necked clams. There is also a series of middens in the Susaki area on the opposite bank across a narrow lowland, and both sites together are consisted to be the "Todoroki Shell Mound". Jōmon pottery from this site from the early Jōmon period (approximately 7,500 years ago) to middle Late Jōmon period (approximately 3,500 years ago) has been classified it into four types: Type A has a twill-like streaky pattern, Type B has several clay bands attached under the rim, Type C has several sunken lines to create curved patterns on the streaked areas, and Type D has sunken lines made with two units of writing tools and horizontal arcs created by continuous piercing. This "Todoroki-style earthenware", has been widely excavated in western Japan and known nationwide an indicator for determining the age of Jōmon period ruins. Excavations have also uncovered a large number of buried human bones.

== See also ==
- List of Historic Sites of Japan (Kumamoto)
