= Midorikawa Station =

Railway station in Uto, Kumamoto Prefecture, Japan

Midorikawa Station 緑川駅
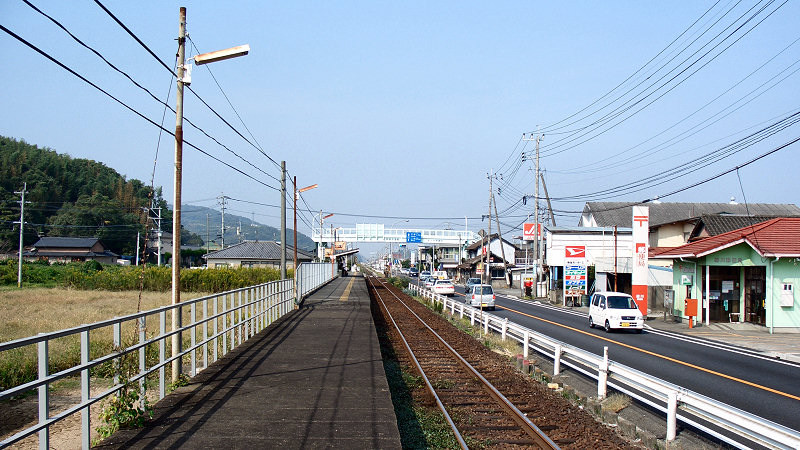
- Midorikawa Station in October 2006

General information
- Location: Nozurumachi, Uto-shi, Kumamoto-ken 869-0463; Japan
- Coordinates: 32°41′39″N 130°37′53″E
- Operator: JR Kyushu
- Line: ■Misumi Line
- Distance: 4.0 km from Uto
- Platforms: 1 side platform
- Tracks: 1

Construction
- Structure type: At-grade
- Accessible: Yes (ramps to platform level)

Other information
- Status: Unstaffed
- Website: Official website

History
- Opened: 1 April 1960

Services
| Preceding station | JR Kyushu | Following station |
|---|---|---|
| Uto Terminus | Misumi Line | Sumiyoshi towards Misumi |
Location
- Location within Kumamoto Prefecture Location within Japan

Midorikawa Station (緑川駅, Midorikawa-eki) is a passenger railway station located in the city of Uto, Kumamoto Prefecture, Japan. It is operated by JR Kyushu.

== Lines ==
The station is served by the Misumi Line and is located 4.0 kilometers from the starting point of the line at Uto.

== Layout ==
The station consists of one side platform at grade serving a single bi-directional track. There is no station building and the station is unattended.

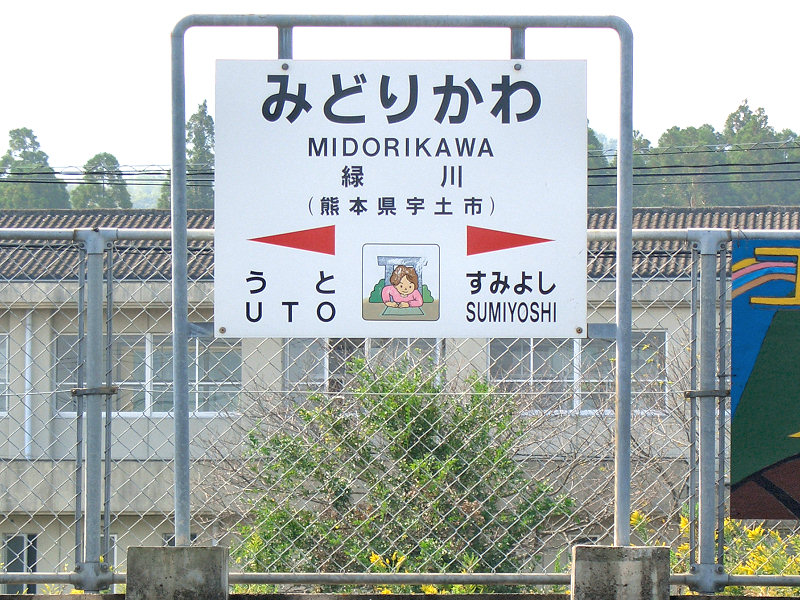
Signage

== History ==
The station was opened on 1 April 1960 by the Japan National Railways (JNR). On April 1, 1987, with the privatization of the JNR, the station came under the control of JR Kyushu.

== Surrounding area ==
- Uto City Midorikawa Elementary School
- Awashima Shrine
- Japan National Route 57

== See also ==
- List of railway stations in Japan
