= Uto, Kumamoto =

Uto 宇土市
- City
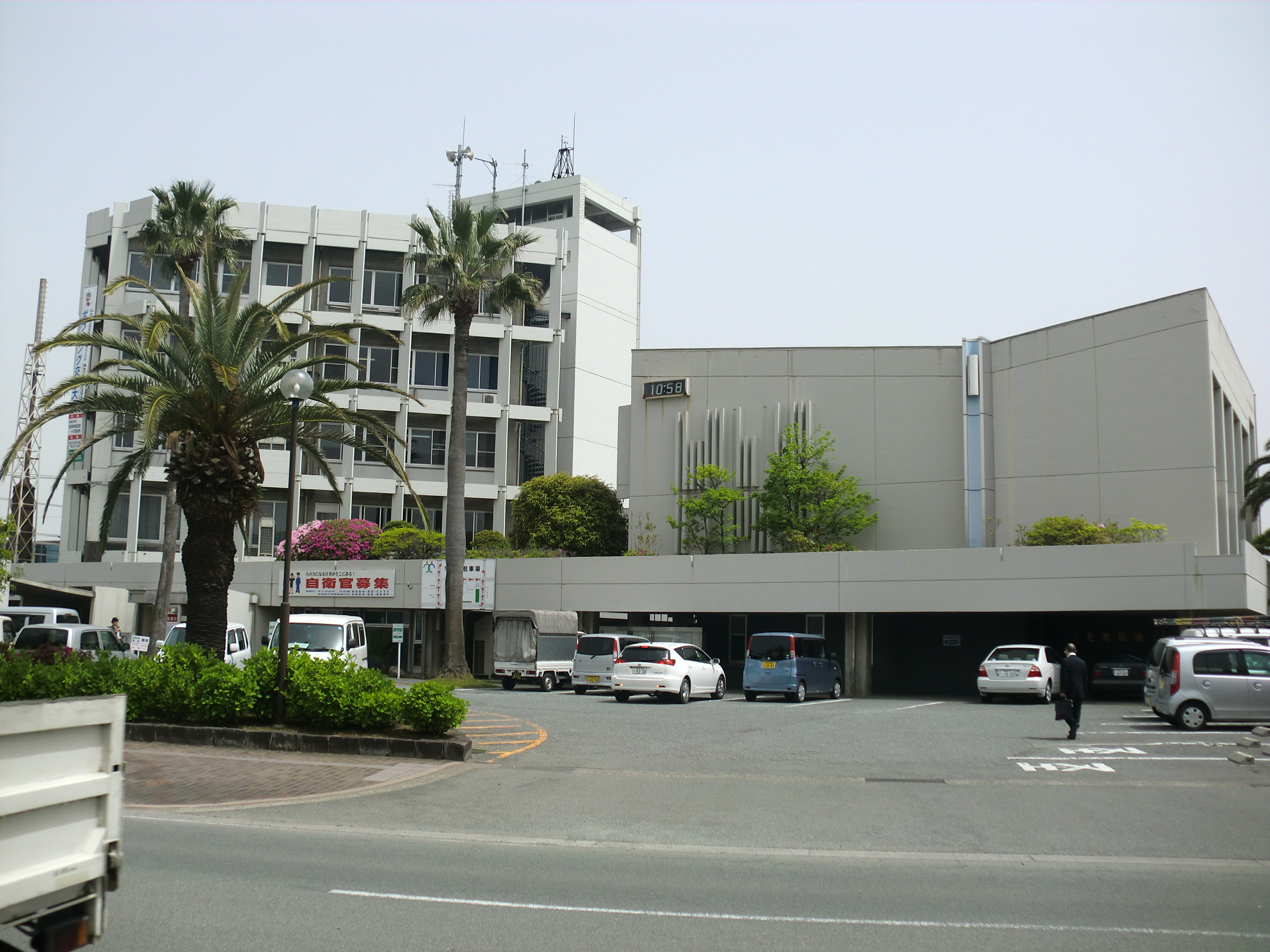
- Uto City Hall

- Flag Emblem
- Location of Uto in Kumamoto Prefecture

- Location in Japan
- Coordinates: 32°41′17″N 130°39′35″E
- Country: Japan
- Region: Kyushu
- Prefecture: Kumamoto

Area
  - Total: 74.30 km^{2} (28.69 sq mi)

Population (August 31, 2024)
  - Total: 36,149
  - Density: 486.5/km^{2} (1,260/sq mi)
- Time zone: UTC+09:00 (JST)
- City hall address: 51 Uratacho, Uto-shi, Kumamoto-ken 869-0492
- Website: Official website
- Symbols
- Bird: Warbling white-eye
- Flower: Hydrangea macrophylla
- Tree: Osmanthus fragrans

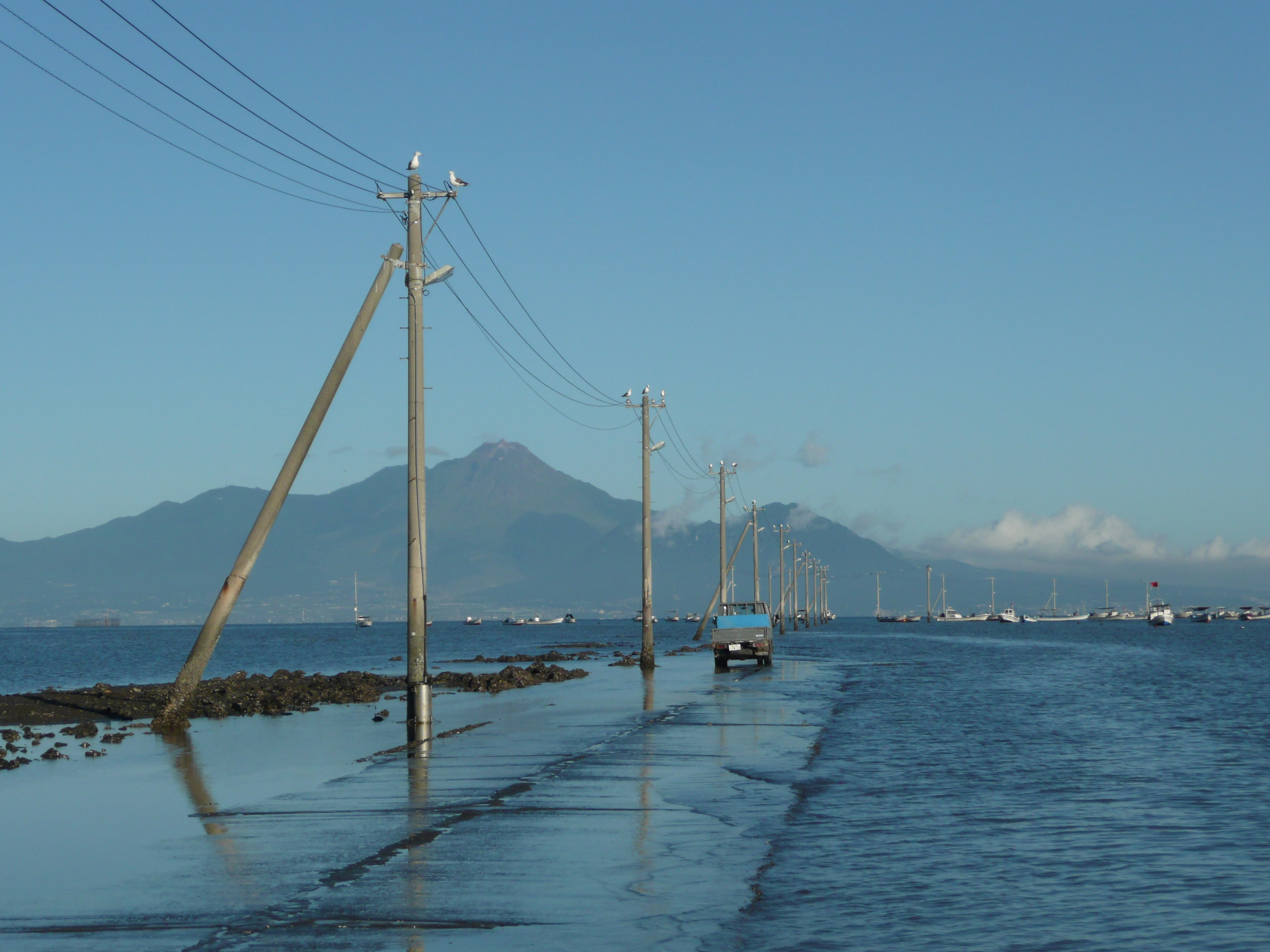
Nagata Seabed Road

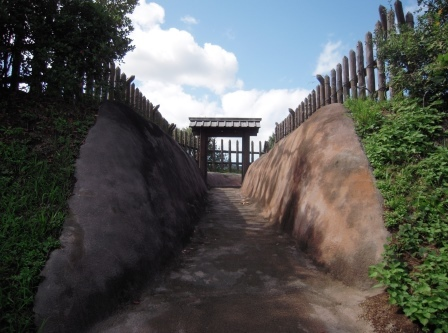
Ruins of Uto Castle

Uto (宇土市, Uto-shi; Japanese pronunciation: [ɯ̈̀.tó̞(.ɕì)]) is a city located in Kumamoto Prefecture, Japan. As of 31 July 2024, the city had an estimated population of 36,149 in 16127 households, and a population density of 490 persons per km^{2}. The total area of the city is 74.30 km^{2} (28.69 sq mi).

== Geography ==
Uto occupies the northern half of the Uto Peninsula and is bordered on the northwest by the Ariake Sea.

=== Neighboring municipalities ===
Kumamoto Prefecture

- Kumamoto
- Uki

=== Climate ===
Uto has a humid subtropical climate (Köppen Cfa) characterized by warm summers and cool winters with light to no snowfall. The average annual temperature in Uto is 16.0 °C. The average annual rainfall is 2128 mm with September as the wettest month. The temperatures are highest on average in August, at around 26.5 °C, and lowest in January, at around 5.5 °C.

=== Demographics ===
Per Japanese census data, the population of Uto is as shown below

Historical population
Year	Pop.	±%
1950	33,412	—
1960	33,057	−1.1%
1970	31,327	−5.2%
1980	32,954	+5.2%
1990	33,390	+1.3%
2000	37,255	+11.6%
2010	37,727	+1.3%
2020	36,122	−4.3%

== History ==
The area of Uto was part of ancient Higo Province, During the Edo Period it was part of the holdings of Kumamoto Domain. After the Meiji restoration, the town of Uto was established with the creation of the modern municipalities system on April 1, 1889. Uto annexed the neighboring village of Hanazono, Todoroki, Midorikawa, Amizu and Hashiragata in 1954. On October 1, 1958 Uto merged with the village Amida and was raised to city status.

As part of an effort to help Kumamoto Prefecture recover from the 2016 earthquakes, One Piece author Eiichiro Oda helped set up 10 statues of the Straw Hats around the prefecture. Jimbei was the last statue, unveiled at Sumiyoshi Kaigan Park in Uto on July 23, 2022.

== Government ==
Uto has a mayor-council form of government with a directly elected mayor and a unicameral city council of 18 members. Uto contributes one member to the Kumamoto Prefectural Assembly. In terms of national politics, the city is part of the Kumamoto 4th district of the lower house of the Diet of Japan.

== Economy ==
- Agriculture - Fruit cultivation is popular, taking advantage of the warm climate. Navel oranges, dekopon, and Andean melons are local specialties.
- Fisheries - Nori farming is popular in the Ariake Sea. Asari clams are also a local speciality.
- Manufacturing - In addition to the food processing industry, there are also chemical and steel industries.
- Papier-mache is a traditional craft that is a local specialty.

== Education ==
Uto has seven public elementary schools and four public junior high schools operated by the city government and one public high school operated by the Kumamoto Prefectural Board of Education.

== Transportation ==
=== Railways ===
JR Kyushu - Kagoshima Main Line

■ - Uto - Midorikawa - Sumiyoshi - Higo-Nagahama - Ōda - Akase

JR Kyushu - Misumi Line

■ - Uto

=== Highways ===
- National Route 3
- National Route 57
- National Route 501

== Local attractions ==
- Uki Castle ruins, National Historic Site
- Todoroki Shell Mound, National Historic Site

== Notable people of Uto ==
- Shiranui Dakuemon, retired sumo wrestler, 8th yokozuna
- Hamanoshima Keishi, retired sumo wrestler, highest rank komusubi
- Yoshinofuji Naoya, sumo wrestler, highest rank maegashira
- Shōdai Naoya, sumo wrestler, highest rank ōzeki
- Naomichi Ueda, Footballer
