= Ishiuchi Dam =

Dam in Kumamoto Prefecture, Japan

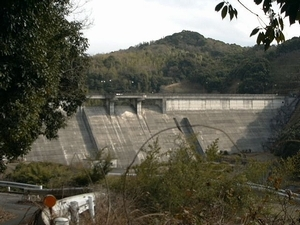

- Location within Japan
- Interactive map of Ishiuchi Dam
- Official name: 石打ダム
- Location: Kumamoto Prefecture, Japan
- Coordinates: 32°38′37″N 130°31′09″E
- Construction began: 1979
- Opening date: 1992

Dam and spillways
- Height: 38.5 m (126 ft)
- Length: 256 m (840 ft)

Reservoir
- Total capacity: 1200 thousand cubic meters
- Catchment area: 3.9 sq. km
- Surface area: 12 hectares

Ishiuchi Dam (Japanese: 石打ダム) is a gravity dam located in Kumamoto Prefecture in Japan. The dam is used for flood control and water supply. The catchment area of the dam is 3.9 km^{2}. The dam impounds about 12 ha of land when full and can store 1200 thousand cubic meters of water. The construction of the dam was started on 1979 and completed in 1992.

== See also ==
- List of dams in Japan
