= Misumi Line =

Railway line in Kumamoto Prefecture, Japan

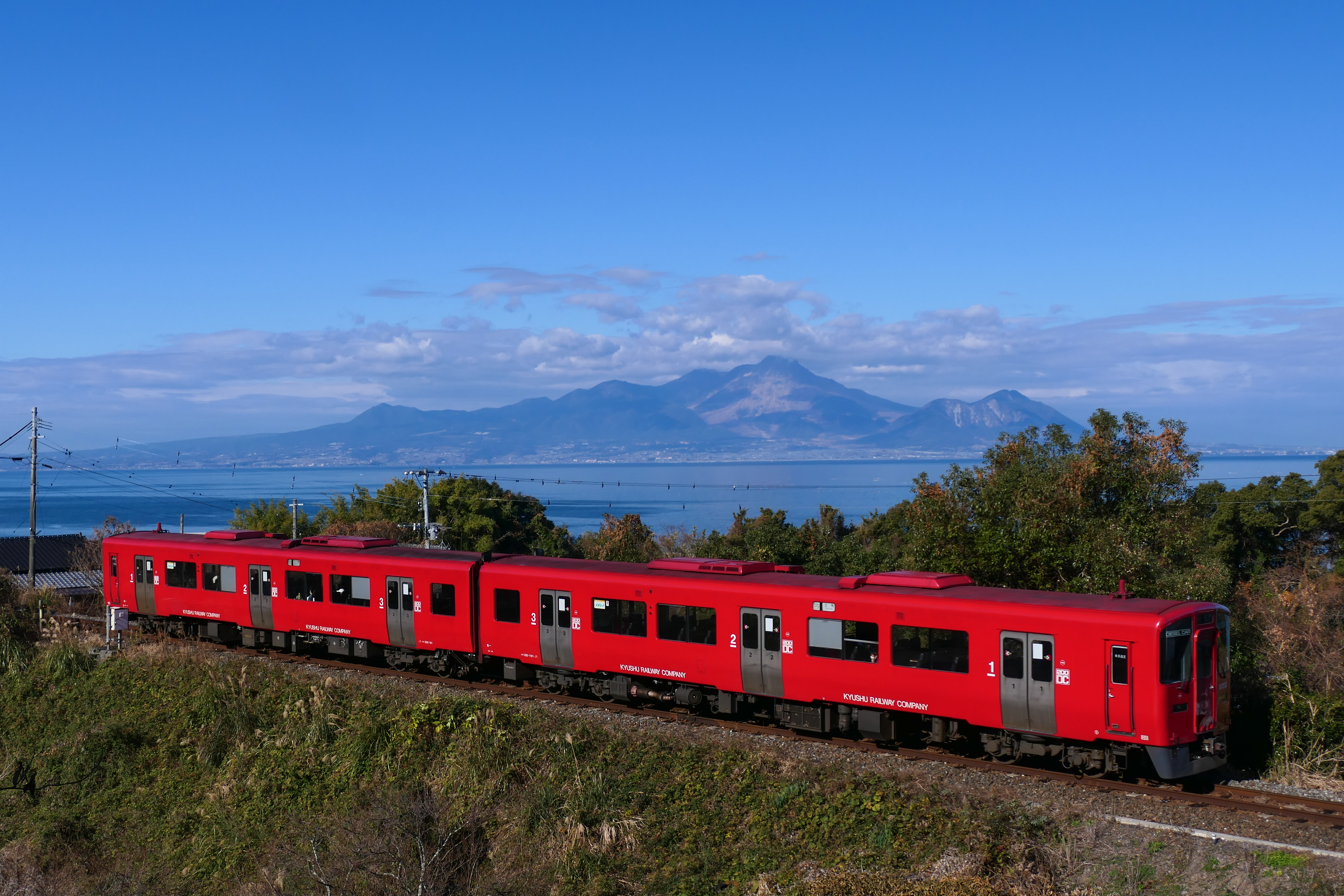
- The Misumi Line between Ōda and Akase stations, January 2022

Overview
- Native name: 三角線
- Status: In operation
- Owner: JR Kyushu
- Locale: Kumamoto Prefecture, Japan
- Termini: Uto; Misumi
- Stations: 9

Service
- Operator(s): JR Kyushu
- Rolling stock: KiHa 185 series DMU, KiHa 40 series DMU, KiHa 200 series DMU

History
- Opened: 1899

Technical
- Line length: 25.6 km (15.9 mi)
- Number of tracks: Entire line single tracked
- Character: Fairly rural
- Track gauge: 1,067 mm (3 ft 6 in)
- Electrification: None
- Operating speed: 85 km/h (53 mph)

Misumi Line (三角線, Misumi-sen) is a railway line in Kyushu, Japan, operated by the Kyushu Railway Company (JR Kyushu). It connects Uto Station in Uto, Kumamoto Prefecture with Misumi Station in Uki, Kumamoto Prefecture. The line is known as the Amakusa Misumi Line (あまくさみすみ線), Amakusa being the largest centre beyond Misumi served by the line.

== Station list ==
Station	Japanese	Distance (km)	Transfers	Location	
Uto	宇土	0.0	Kagoshima Main Line	Uto	Kumamoto Prefecture
Midorikawa	緑川	4.0		Uto	Kumamoto Prefecture
Sumiyoshi	住吉	7.2		Uto	Kumamoto Prefecture
Higo-Nagahama	肥後長浜	11.4		Uto	Kumamoto Prefecture
Ōda	網田	14.5		Uto	Kumamoto Prefecture
Akase	赤瀬	18.4		Uto	Kumamoto Prefecture
Ishiuchi Dam	石打ダム	19.6		Uki	Kumamoto Prefecture
Hataura	波多浦	23.5		Uki	Kumamoto Prefecture
Misumi	三角	25.6		Uki	Kumamoto Prefecture

== History ==
The Kyushu Railway Co. opened the entire line in 1899, and was nationalised in 1907.

Freight services ceased in 1982.
