= KiHa 185 series =

Japanese diesel multiple unit train type

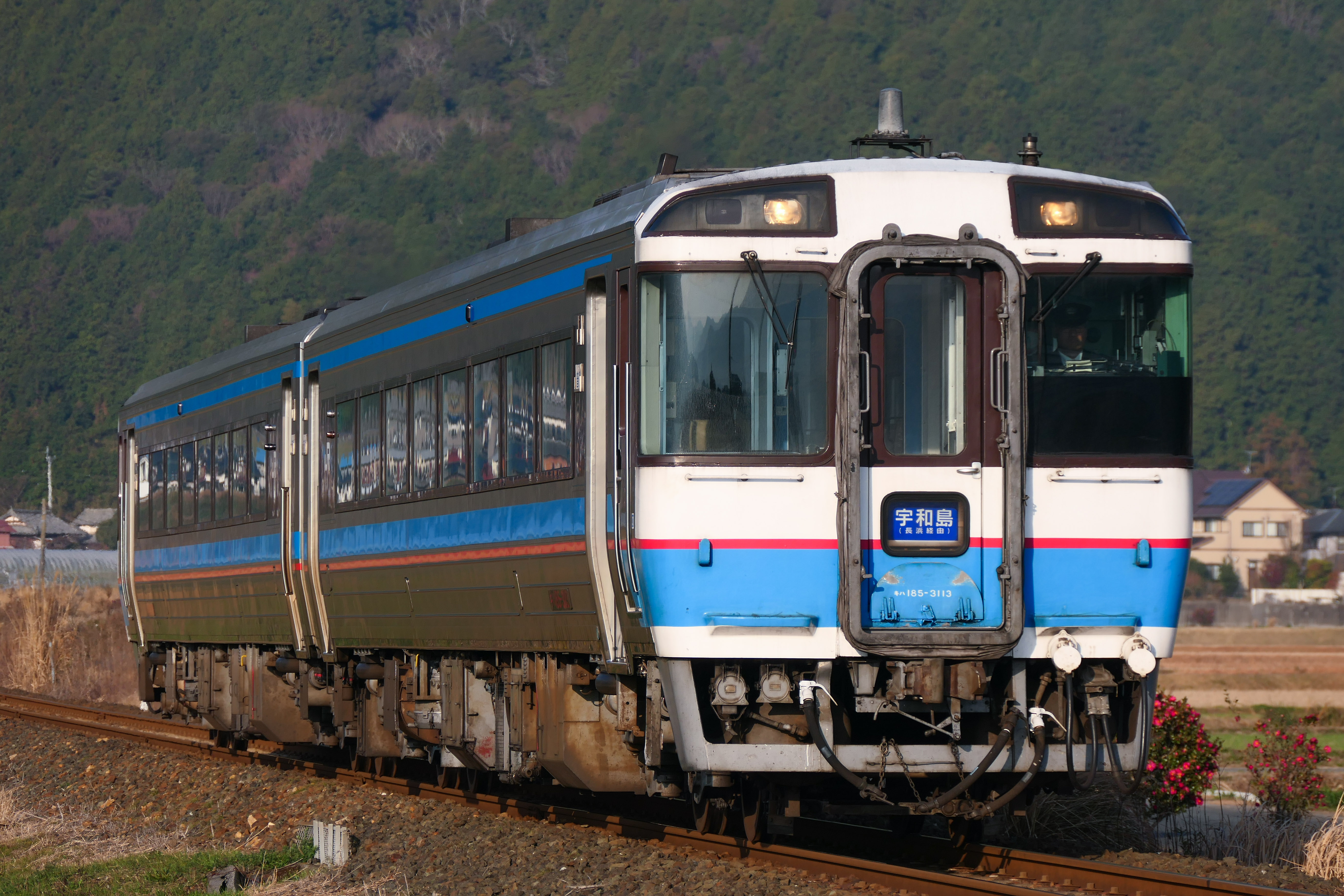
- A KiHa 185 series train in December 2019
- In service: 1986–present
- Constructed: 1986–1988
- Entered service: 1 November 1986
- Number in service: 52 vehicles
- Operators: JNR (1986–1987); JR Kyushu (1987–present); JR Shikoku (1987–present)

Specifications
- Car body construction: Stainless steel
- Doors: Two per side
- Maximum speed: 110 km/h (68 mph)
- Track gauge: 1,067 mm (3 ft 6 in)

The KiHa 185 series (キハ185系) is a diesel multiple unit (DMU) train type operated by Japanese National Railways in Japan since November 1986, and later operated by Kyushu Railway Company (JR Kyushu) and Shikoku Railway Company (JR Shikoku).

The "KiHa" designation derives from the classification system used by JNR. "Ki" indicates a diesel-powered vehicle, while "Ha" indicates an ordinary passenger car, as opposed to a green car.

== Fleet ==
As of 1 April 2016, JR Kyushu operates 20 vehicles, and JR Shikoku operates 32 vehicles.

== See also ==
- Joyful Train
