= Misumi Station =

Railway station in Uki, Kumamoto Prefecture, Japan

Misumi Station 三角駅
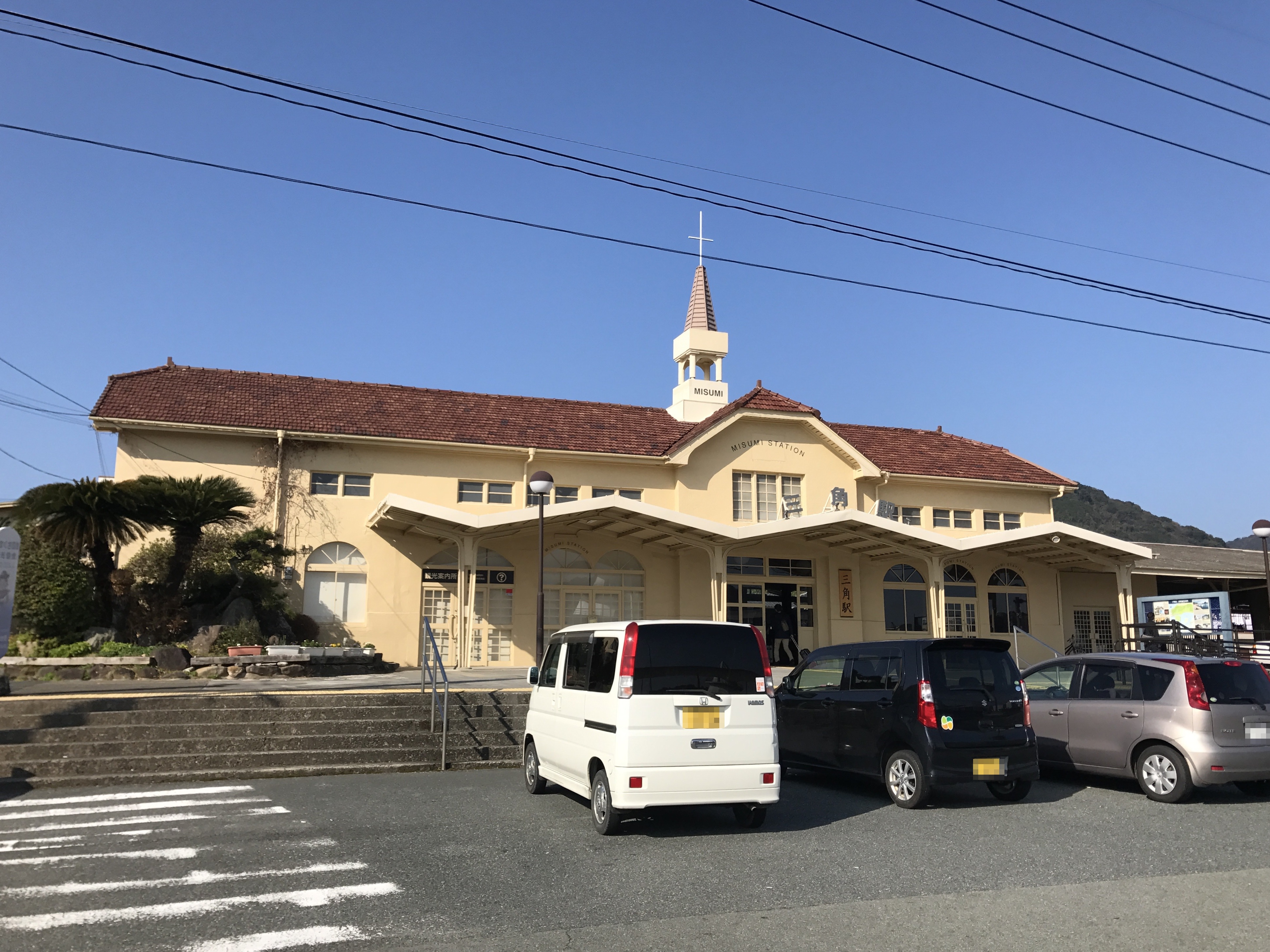
- Misumi Station in January 2017

General information
- Location: 159 Misumiura, Misumicho, Uki-shi, Kumamoto-ken 869-3207; Japan
- Coordinates: 32°36′27.77″N 130°28′11.23″E
- Operator: JR Kyushu
- Line: ■Misumi Line
- Distance: 25.6 from Uto
- Platforms: 1 side platform
- Tracks: 2

Other information
- Status: Staffed (Midori no Madoguchi)
- Website: Official website

History
- Opened: 25 December 1899

Passengers
- FY2020: 252

Services
Preceding station	JR Kyushu	Following station
Hataura towards Uto	Misumi Line	Terminus
Location
- Location within Kumamoto Prefecture Location within Japan

Misumi Station (三角駅, Misumi-eki) is a passenger railway station located in the city of Uki, Kumamoto Prefecture, Japan. It is operated by JR Kyushu.

== Lines ==
The station is served by the Misumi Line and is located 18.4 kilometers from the starting point of the line at Uto. Misumi Station is the terminus of the Misumi Line, and lies 25.6 km from the starting point of the line at Uto. It is also one of the termini for the A-Train limited express, which operates between Misumi and Kumamoto Station.

== Layout ==
The station consists of a single side platform serving one track at grade and one siding. The station building, built in 1907, has a Midori no Madoguchi staffed ticket office.

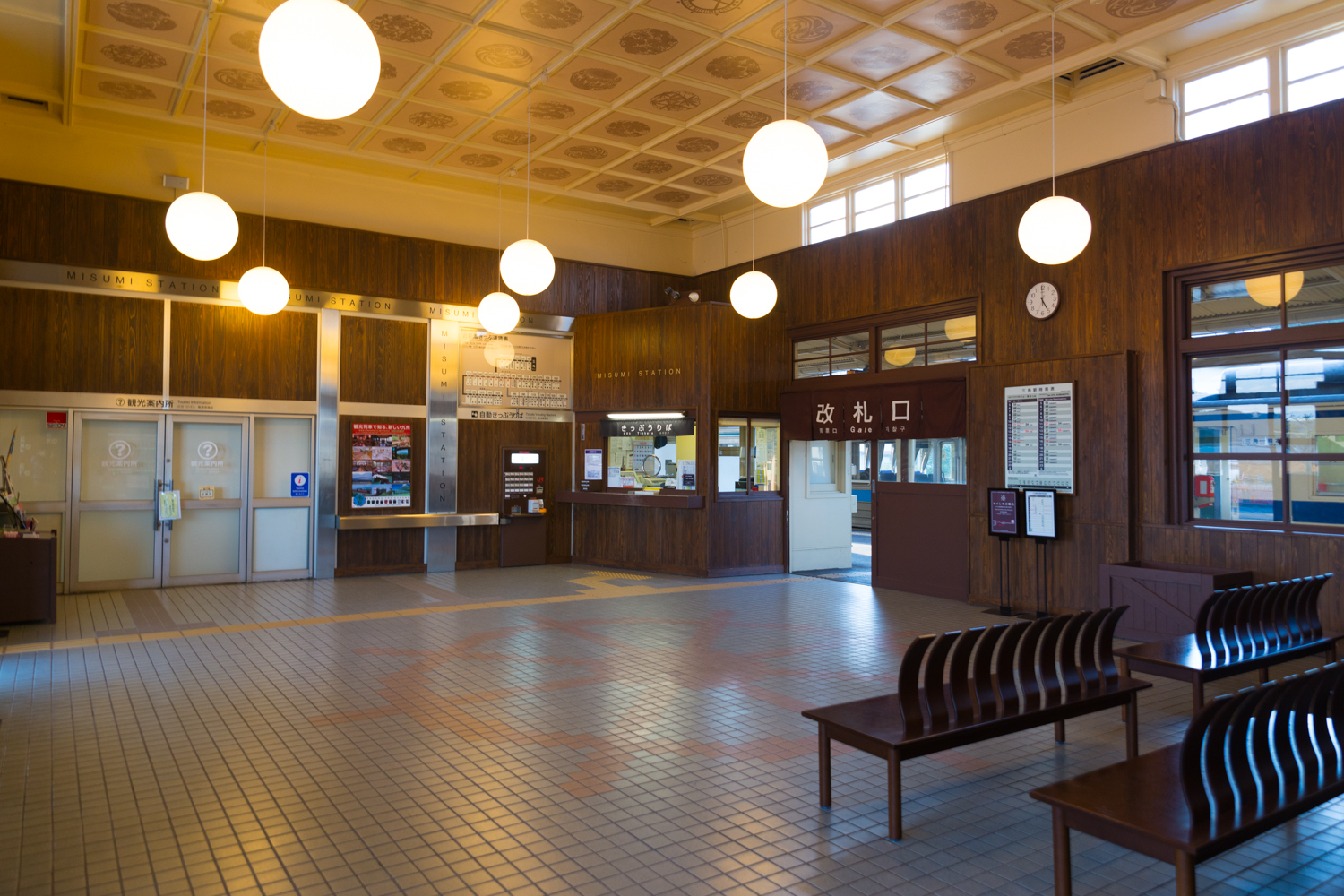
Interior of station building

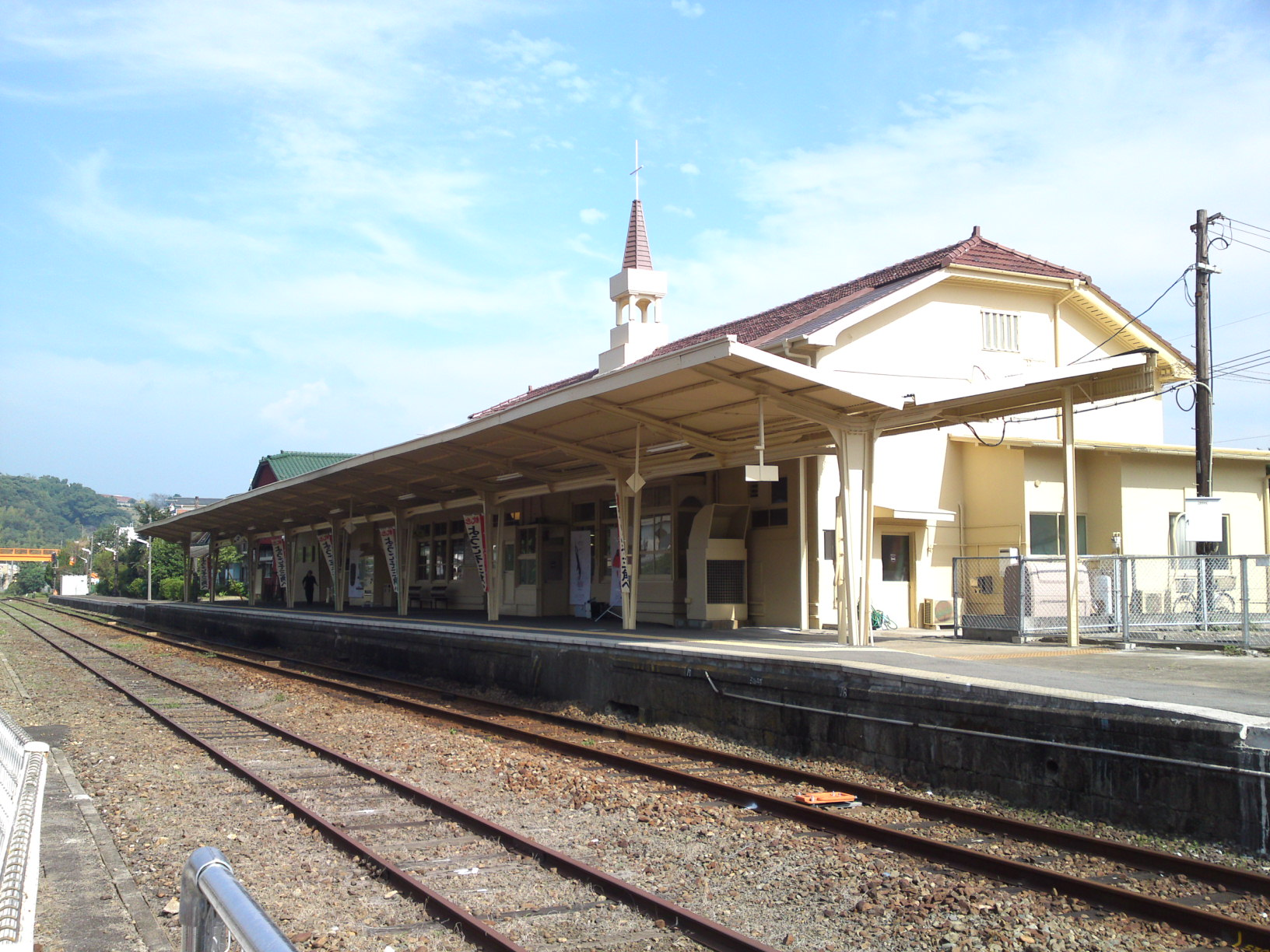
Platforn

== History ==
The station opened on 25 December 1899 on the Kyushu Railway, which was nationalized in 1907. With the privatization of Japanese National Railways (JNR) on 1 April 1987, the station came under the control of JR Kyushu.

== Passenger statistics ==
In fiscal 2020, the station was used by an average of 252 passengers daily (boarding passengers only), and it ranked 298th among the busiest stations of JR Kyushu.

== Surrounding area ==
- Misumi Port
- Tenmon Bashi (first of the Five Bridges of Amakusa)

== See also ==
- List of railway stations in Japan
