= Uto Station =

Railway station in Uto, Kumamoto Prefecture, Japan

Uto Station 宇土駅
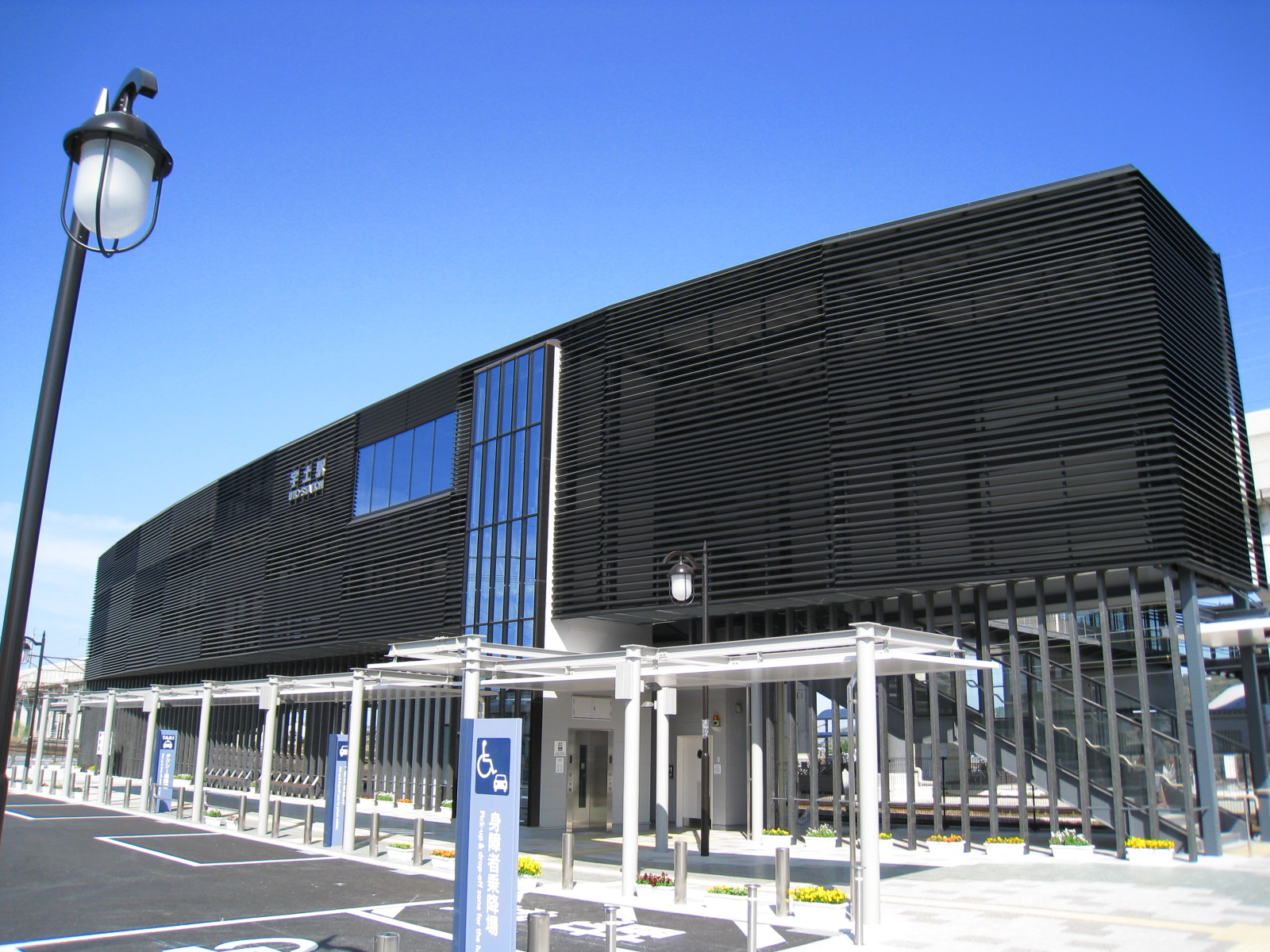
- Uto Station in March 2010

General information
- Location: Sajitcho, Uto-shi, Kumamoto-ken 869-0406; Japan
- Coordinates: 32°41′39″N 130°40′09″E
- Operator: JR Kyushu
- Line: ■ Kagoshima Main Line ■Misumi Line
- Distance: 207.5 km from Mojikō
- Platforms: 1 island platform
- Tracks: 2

Other information
- Status: Staffed (Midori no Madoguchi)
- Website: Official website

History
- Opened: 28 January 1895; 131 years ago

Passengers
- FY2020: 1504

Services
Preceding station	JR Kyushu	Following station
Matsubase towards Kagoshima	Kagoshima Main Line	Tomiai towards Mojikō
Terminus	Misumi Line	Midorikawa towards Misumi
Location
- Location within Kumamoto Prefecture Location within Japan

Uto Station (宇土駅, Uto-eki) is a junction passenger railway station located in the city of Uto, Kumamoto Prefecture, Japan. It is operated by JR Kyushu.

== Lines ==
The station is served by the Kagoshima Main Line and is 207.5 kilometers from the starting point of that line at Mojikō. It is also the western Terminus of the 25.6 kilometer Misumi Line to Misumi.

== Layout ==
The station consists of one island platform, two tracks, and one through track, connected by an elevated station building.The east and west exits are connected by a free passage. The station has a Midori no Madoguchi staffed ticket office.

=== Platforms ===
1	■ Kagoshima Main Line	for Kumamoto, Kurume and Hakata
2	■ ■Kagoshima Main Line	for Shin-Yatsushiro and Yatsushiro
2	■ ■ Misumi Line	for Misumi

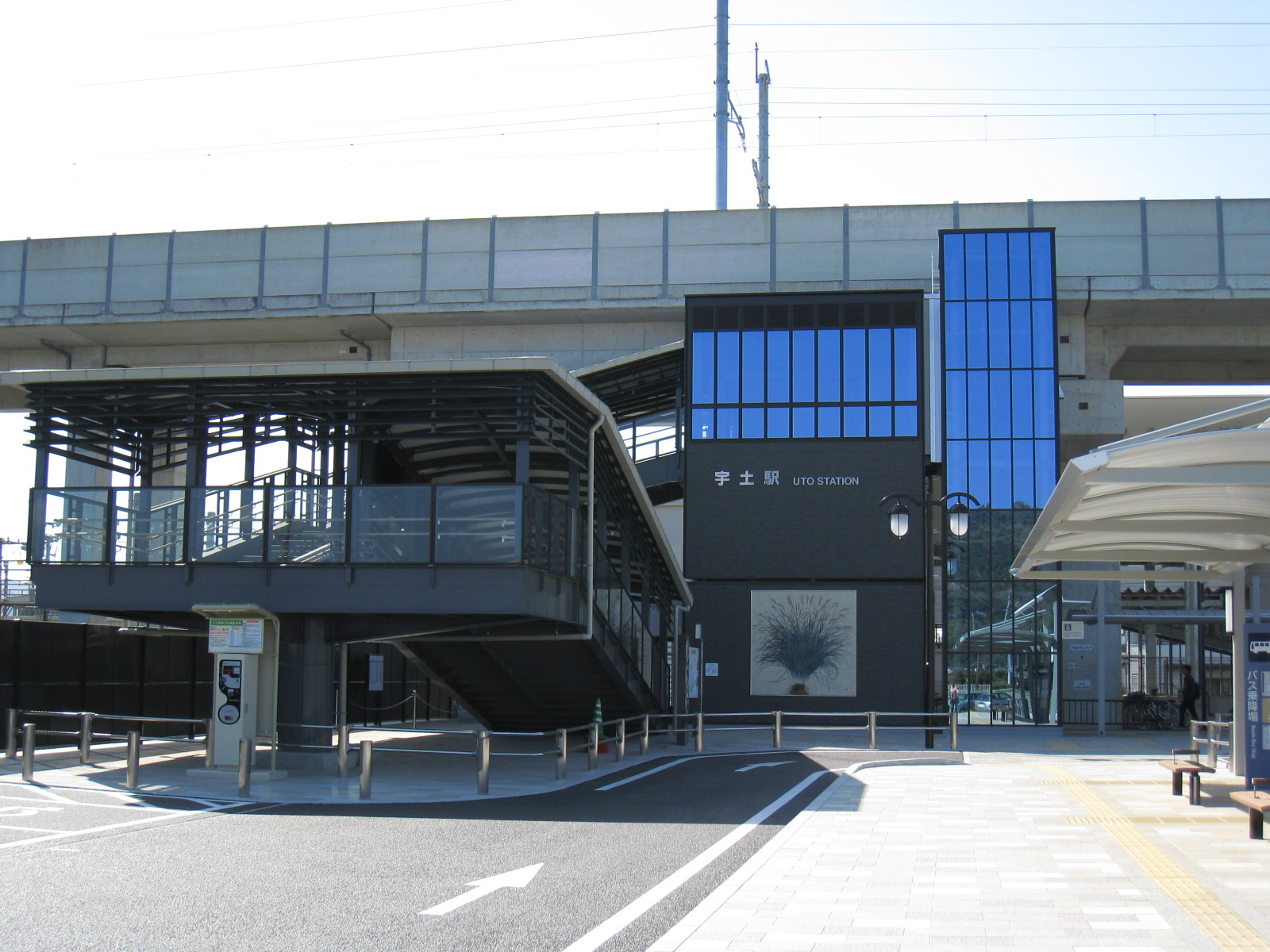
East Exit

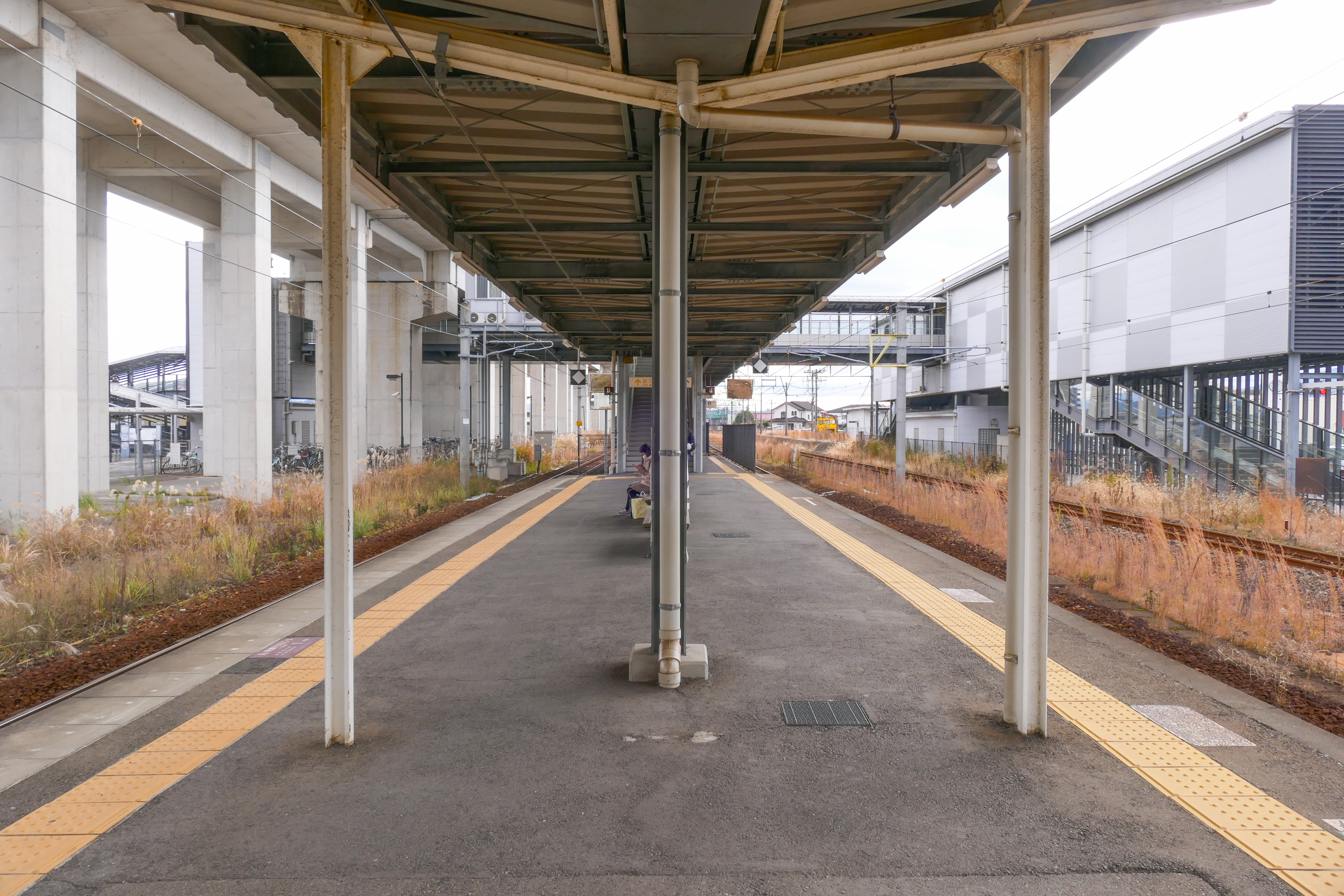
Platform

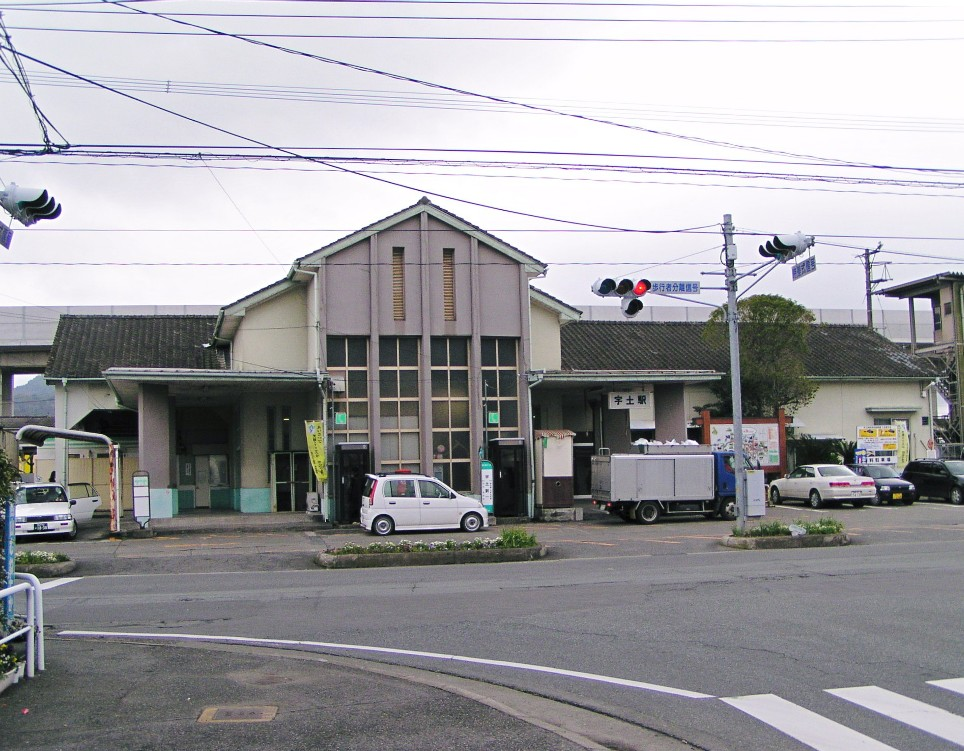
former station building (1947-2009)

== History ==
The station was opened on 28 January 1895 by the Kyushu Railway, which was nationalized on 1 July 1907. Following the privatization of the Japan National Railways on April 1, 1987, the station came under the control of JR Kyushu.

== Passenger statistics ==
In fiscal 2020, the station was used by an average of 1504 passengers daily (boarding passengers only), and it ranked 97th among the busiest stations of JR Kyushu.

== Surrounding area ==
- Uto City Hall
- Japan National Route 3
- Japan National Route 57

== See also ==
- List of railway stations in Japan
