= Inukai Station =

Railway station in Bungo-Ōno, Ōita Prefecture, Japan

Inukai Station 犬飼駅
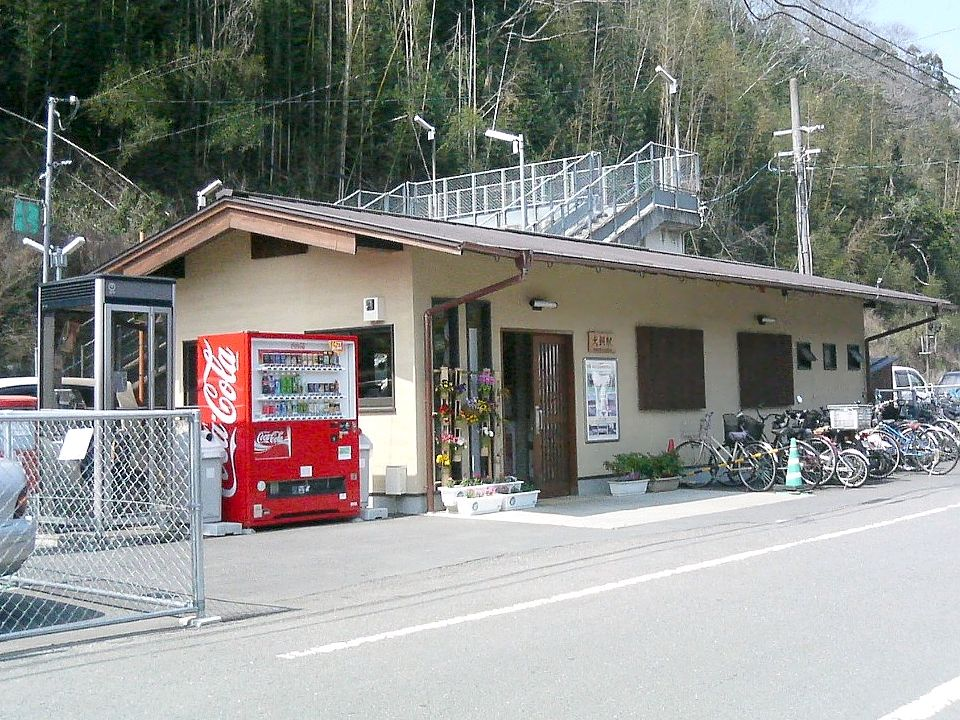
- Inukai Station in 2007

General information
- Location: Inukaimachi Shimotsuo, Bungo-Ōno-shi, Ōita-ken 879-7306; Japan
- Coordinates: 33°04′41″N 131°38′12″E
- Operator: JR Kyushu
- Line: ■ Hōhi Main Line
- Distance: 125.2 km from Kumamoto
- Platforms: 1 island platform
- Tracks: 2 + 1 siding

Construction
- Structure type: At grade

Other information
- Status: Unstaffed
- Website: Official website

History
- Opened: 20 July 1917

Passengers
- FY2016: 324 daily
- Rank: 299th (among JR Kyushu stations)

Services
Preceding station	JR Kyushu	Following station
Sugao towards Kumamoto	Hōhi Main Line	Takenaka towards Ōita
Location
- Location within Oita Prefecture Location within Japan

Inukai Station (犬飼駅, Inukai-eki) is a passenger railway station located in the city of Bungo-Ōno, Ōita Prefecture, Japan. It is operated by JR Kyushu.

== Lines ==
The station is served by the Hōhi Main Line and is located 125.2 km from the starting point of the line at Kumamoto.

== Layout ==
The station consists of an island platform serving two tracks. The station building is a small modern functional steel frame structure which is unstaffed and serves only as a waiting room with an automatic ticket vending machine. Access to the island platform is by means of a footbridge.

=== Platforms ===
1	■ ■ Hōhi Main Line	for Bungo-Taketa and Kumamoto
2	■ ■ Hōhi Main Line	for Ōita

== History ==
Japanese Government Railways (JGR) had opened the Inukai Light Rail Line (犬飼軽便線) (later Inukai Line) from Ōita to Nakahanda on 1 April 1914. The track was extended westwards in phases, with Inukai opening as the new western terminus on 20 July 1917. It became a through-station on 27 MNarch 1921 when the track was extended to Miemachi. By 1928, the track been extended further west and had linked up with the Miyagi Line (宮地線) reaching eastwards from Kumamoto. On 2 December 1928, the entire track from Kumamoto through Inukai to Ōita was designated as the Hōhi Main Line. With the privatization of Japanese National Railways (JNR), the successor of JGR, on 1 April 1987, the station came under the control of JR Kyushu.

In September 2017, Typhoon Talim (Typhoon 18) damaged the Hōhi Main Line at several locations. Services between Aso and Nakahanda, including Inukai, were suspended and replaced by bus services. Normal rail services between Aso and Ōita were restored by 2 October 2017.

== Passenger statistics ==
In fiscal 2016, the station was used by an average of 324 passengers daily (boarding passengers only), and it ranked 299th among the busiest stations of JR Kyushu.

== Surrounding area ==
- Bungo Ono City Hall Inukai Branch Office
- Bungo Ono City Inukai Elementary School
- Bungo Ono City Inukai Junior High School

== See also ==
- List of railway stations in Japan
