= Miemachi Station =

Railway station in Bungo-Ōno, Ōita Prefecture, Japan

Miemachi Station 三重町駅
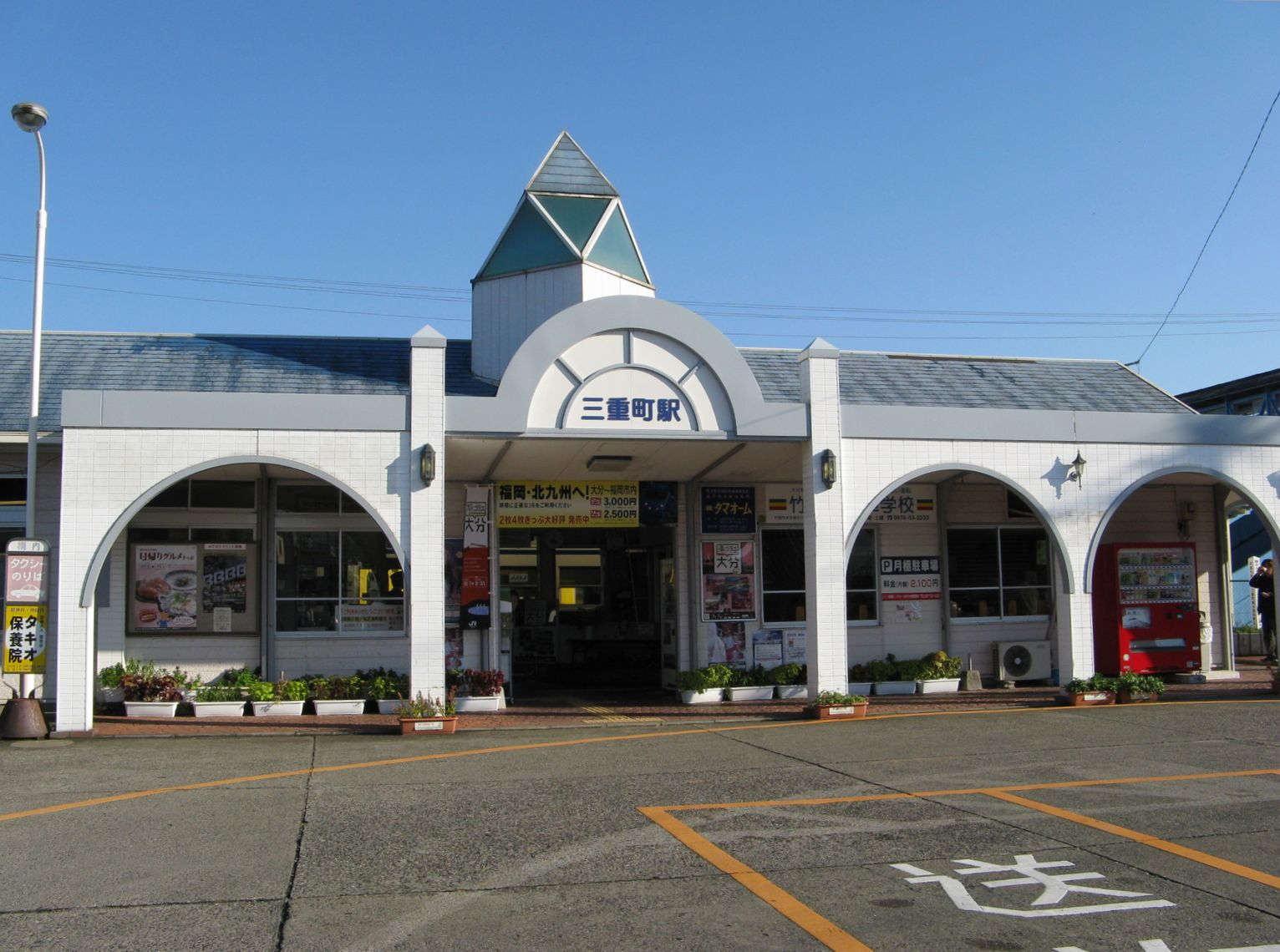
- Miemachi Station in 2008

General information
- Location: Miemachi Akamine, Bungo-Ōno-shi, Ōita-ken 879-7111; Japan
- Coordinates: 32°59′01″N 131°35′04″E
- Operator: JR Kyushu
- Line: ■ Hōhi Main Line
- Distance: 111.9 km from Kumamoto
- Platforms: 1 side + 1 island platforms
- Tracks: 3 + 1 siding

Construction
- Structure type: At grade

Other information
- Status: Staffed ticket window (Midori no Madoguchi) (outsourced)
- Website: Official website

History
- Opened: 27 March 1921

Passengers
- FY2016: 844 daily
- Rank: 185th (among JR Kyushu stations)

Services
Preceding station	JR Kyushu	Following station
Bungo-Kiyokawa towards Kumamoto	Hōhi Main Line	Sugao towards Ōita
Location
- Location within Oita Prefecture Location within Japan

Miemachi Station (三重町駅, Miemachi-eki) is a passenger railway station located in the city of Bungo-Ōno, Ōita Prefecture, Japan. It is operated by JR Kyushu.

== Lines ==
The station is served by the Hōhi Main Line and is located 111.9 km from the starting point of the line at Kumamoto.

== Layout ==
The station consists of a side platform and an island platform serving three tracks with a siding branching off track 3. The station building is a wooden structure in western style and houses a waiting area, an automatic ticket vending machine and a staffed ticket window. Access to the island platform is by means of a covered footbridge.

Management of the station has been outsourced to the JR Kyushu Tetsudou Eigyou Co., a wholly owned subsidiary of JR Kyushu specialising in station services. It staffs the ticket booth which is equipped with a Midori no Madoguchi facility.

=== Platforms ===
1	■ ■ Hōhi Main Line	for Bungo-Taketa and Kumamoto
2, 3	■ ■ Hōhi Main Line	for Ōita

== Adjacent stations ==
«	Service	»
Hōhi Main Line
Bungo-Kiyokawa	Local	Sugao
Nakahanda	Limited express Aso Boy!	Ogata

Due to earthquake damage on the Hōhi Main Line, the Aso Boy! Limited Express from Kumamoto to Aso was suspended. From April 2017, the Aso Boy! began operating on an alternative route from Beppu through Ōita to Aso.

== History ==
Japanese Government Railways (JGR) had opened the Inukai Light Rail Line (犬飼軽便線) (later Inukai Line) from Ōita to Nakahanda on 1 April 1914. The track was extended westwards in phases, with Miemachi opening as the new western terminus on 27 March 1921. Miemachi became a through-station on 23 November 1922 when the track was extended to Ogata. By 1928, the track been extended further west and had linked up with the Miyagi Line (宮地線) reaching eastwards from Kumamoto. On 2 December 1928, the entire track from Kumamoto through Miemachi to Ōita was designated as the Hōhi Main Line. With the privatization of Japanese National Railways (JNR), the successor of JGR, on 1 April 1987, the station came under the control of JR Kyushu.

On 17 September 2017, Typhoon Talim (Typhoon 18) damaged the Hōhi Main Line at several locations. Services between Aso and Nakahanda, including Miemachi, were suspended and replaced by bus services. Rail service from Aso to Miemachi was restored by 22 September 2017 Normal rail services between Aso and Ōita were restored by 2 October 2017.

== Passenger statistics ==
In fiscal 2016, the station was used by an average of 844 passengers daily (boarding passengers only), and it ranked 185th among the busiest stations of JR Kyushu.

== Surrounding area ==
The center of Bungo-Ono City is located in front of the station exit (south side).

- Bungo Ono City Hall
- Oita Prefecture Bungo-Ono General Government Building

== See also ==
- List of railway stations in Japan
