= Sugao Station =

Railway station in Bungo-Ōno, Ōita Prefecture, Japan

Sugao Station 菅尾駅
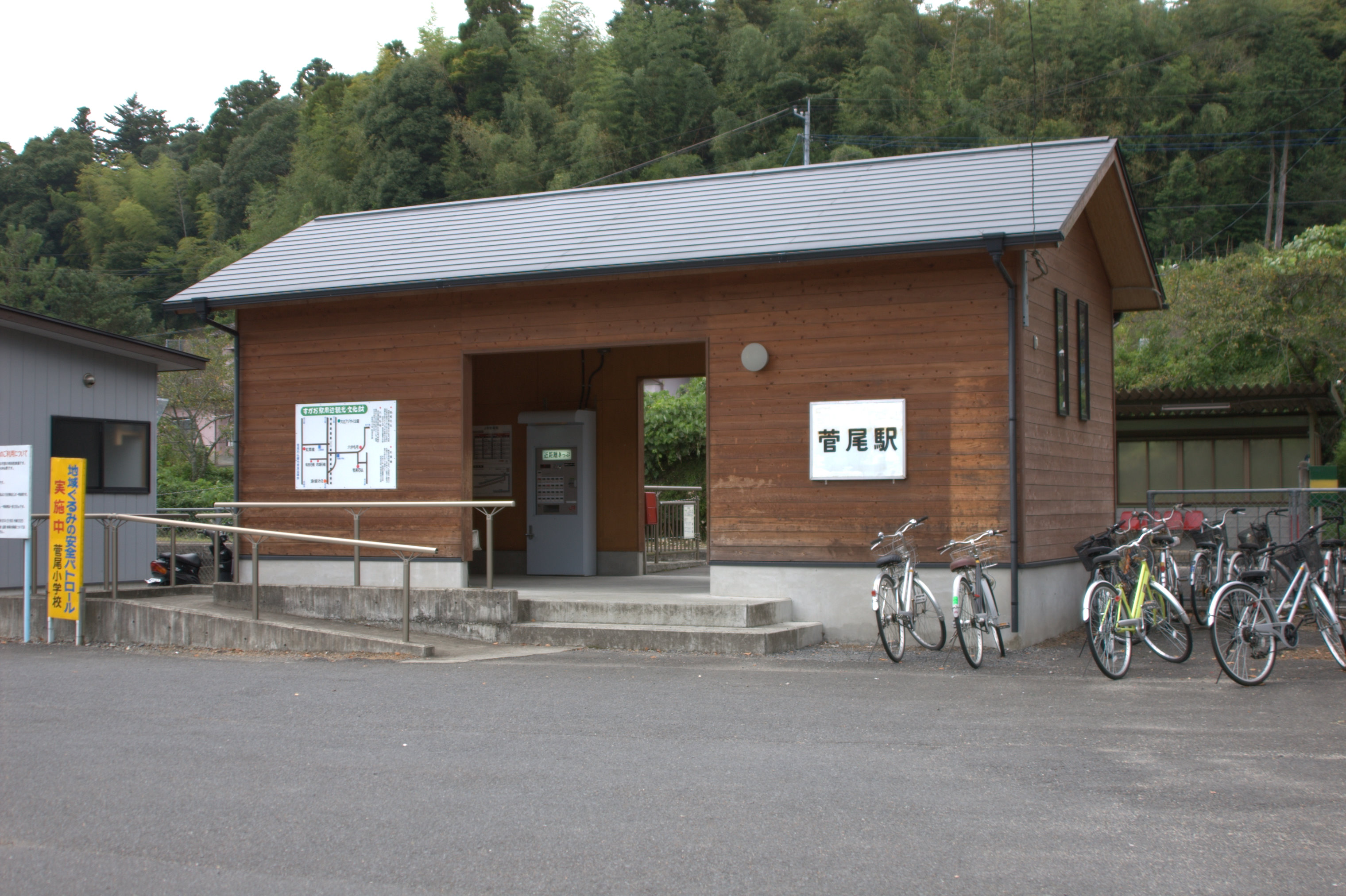
- Sugao Station in 2009

General information
- Location: Miemachi Sugou, Bungo-Ōno-shi, Ōita-ken879-7102; Japan
- Coordinates: 33°00′52″N 131°37′00″E
- Operator: JR Kyushu
- Line: ■ Hōhi Main Line
- Distance: 117.3 km from Kumamoto
- Platforms: 2 side platforms
- Tracks: 2 + 1 siding

Construction
- Structure type: At grade

Other information
- Status: Unstaffed
- Website: Official website

History
- Opened: 27 March 1921

Passengers
- FY2015: 190 daily

Services
Preceding station	JR Kyushu	Following station
Miemachi towards Kumamoto	Hōhi Main Line	Inukai towards Ōita
Location
- Location within Oita Prefecture Location within Japan

Sugao Station (菅尾駅, Sugao-eki) is a passenger railway station located in the city of Bungo-Ōno, Ōita Prefecture, Japan. It is operated by JR Kyushu.

== Lines ==
The station is served by the Hōhi Main Line and is located 117.3 km from the starting point of the line at Kumamoto.

== Layout ==
The station consists of two side platforms serving two tracks with a siding. The station building is a modern wooden structure which is unstaffed and serves only as a waiting room with an automatic ticket vending machine. A ramp leads up to the station building from the forecourt but access to the opposite platform is by means of a footbridge.

=== Platforms ===
1	■ ■ Hōhi Main Line	for Bungo-Taketa and Kumamoto
2	■ ■ Hōhi Main Line	for Ōita

== History ==
Japanese Government Railways (JGR) had opened the Inukai Light Rail Line (犬飼軽便線) (later Inukai Line) from Ōita to Nakahanda on 1 April 1914. The track was extended westwards in phases, with Miemachi opening as the new western terminus on 27 March 1921. On the same day, Sugao was opened as an intermediate station on the new track. By 1928, the track been extended further west and had linked up with the Miyagi Line (宮地線) reaching eastwards from Kumamoto. On 2 December 1928, the entire track from Kumamoto through Sugao to Ōita was designated as the Hōhi Main Line. With the privatization of Japanese National Railways (JNR), the successor of JGR, on 1 April 1987, the station came under the control of JR Kyushu.

In September 2017, Typhoon Talim (Typhoon 18) damaged the Hōhi Main Line at several locations. Services between Aso and Nakahanda, including Sugao, were suspended and replaced by bus services. Normal rail services between Aso and Ōita were restored by 2 October 2017.

== Passenger statistics ==
In fiscal 2015, there were a total of 69,416 boarding passengers, giving a daily average of 190 passengers.

== Surrounding area ==
- Bungo-Ono City Sugao Elementary School
- Sugao Stone Buddha
- Japan National Route 326

== See also ==
- List of railway stations in Japan
