= Bungo-Kiyokawa Station =

Railway station in Bungo-Ōno, Ōita Prefecture, Japan

Bungo-Kiyokawa Station 豊後清川駅
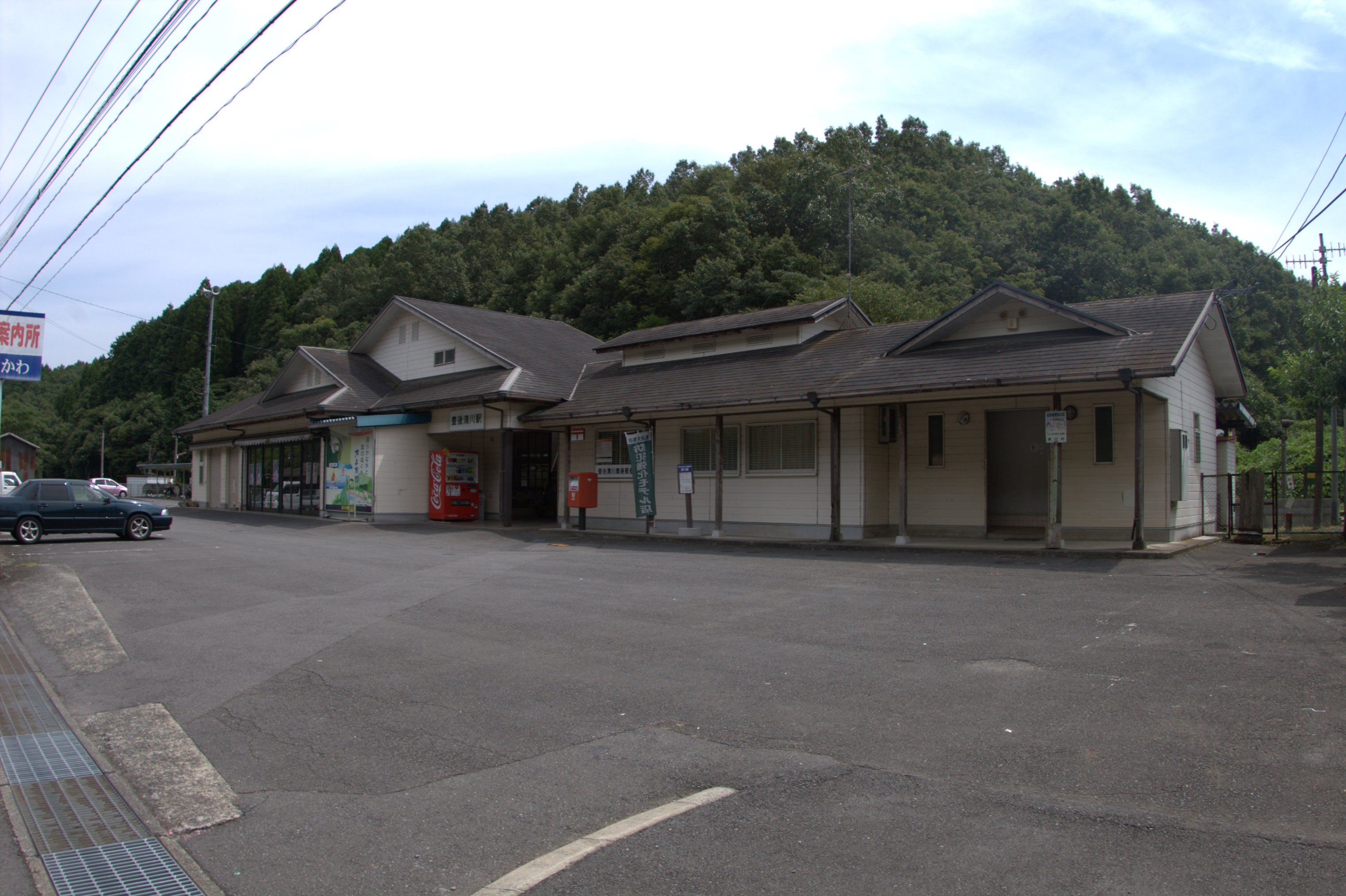
- Bungo-Kiyokawa Station in 2009

General information
- Location: Kiyokawamachi Amazutsumi, Bungo-Ōno-shi, Ōita-ken 879-6902; Japan
- Coordinates: 32°58′23″N 131°31′24″E
- Operator: JR Kyushu
- Line: ■ Hōhi Main Line
- Distance: 105.4 km from Kumamoto
- Platforms: 2 side platforms
- Tracks: 2

Construction
- Structure type: At grade

Other information
- Status: Kan'i itaku agent onsite
- Website: Official website

History
- Opened: 23 November 1922
- Former names: Makiguchi (until 1 November 1990)

Passengers
- FY2015: 64 daily

Services
Preceding station	JR Kyushu	Following station
Ogata towards Kumamoto	Hōhi Main Line	Miemachi towards Ōita
Location
- Location within Oita Prefecture Location within Japan

Bungo-Kiyokawa Station (豊後清川駅, Bungo-Kiyokawa-eki) is a passenger railway station located in the city of Bungo-Ōno, Ōita Prefecture, Japan. It is operated by JR Kyushu.

== Lines ==
The station is served by the Hōhi Main Line and is located 105.4 km from the starting point of the line at Kumamoto.

== Layout ==
The station consists of two side platforms serving two tracks. The station building is an old wooden structure where the floorspace is shared with a post office and the local tourism information centre. Access to the opposite side platform is by means of a level crossing. The station is not staffed by JR Kyushu but some types of tickets are available from a kan'i itaku agent who staffs the ticket window.

=== Platforms ===
1	■ ■ Hōhi Main Line	for Ōita
2	■ ■ Hōhi Main Line	for Bungo-Taketa and Kumamoto

== History ==
Japanese Government Railways (JGR) had opened the Inukai Light Rail Line (犬飼軽便線) (later Inukai Line) from Ōita to Nakahanda on 1 April 1914. The track was extended westwards in phases, with Ogata opening as the new western terminus on 23 November 1922. On the same day, this station was opened as an intermediate station on the track with the name Makiguchi (牧口), after the village the station was located in. By 1928, the track had been extended further west and had linked up with the Miyagi Line (宮地線) reaching eastwards from Kumamoto. On 2 December 1928, the entire track from Kumamoto through Makiguchi to Ōita was designated as the Hōhi Main Line. With the privatization of Japanese National Railways (JNR), the successor of JGR, on 1 April 1987, the station came under the control of JR Kyushu. On 1 November 1990, the station was renamed Bungo-Kiyokawa.

On 17 September 2017, Typhoon Talim (Typhoon 18) damaged the Hōhi Main Line at several locations. Services between Aso and Nakahanda, including Bungo-Kiyokawa, were suspended and replaced by bus services. Rail service from Aso to Miemachi was restored by 22 September 2017 Normal rail services between Aso and Ōita were restored by 2 October 2017.

== Passenger statistics ==
In fiscal 2015, there were a total of 23,394 boarding passengers, giving a daily average of 64 passengers.

== Surrounding area ==
- Bungo Ono City Hall Kiyokawa Branch Office
- Bungo Ono City Kita Elementary School
- Bungo Ono City Kiyokawa Elementary School

== See also ==
- List of railway stations in Japan
