= Ogata Station (Ōita) =

Railway station in Bungo-Ōno, Ōita Prefecture, Japan

Ogata Station 緒方駅
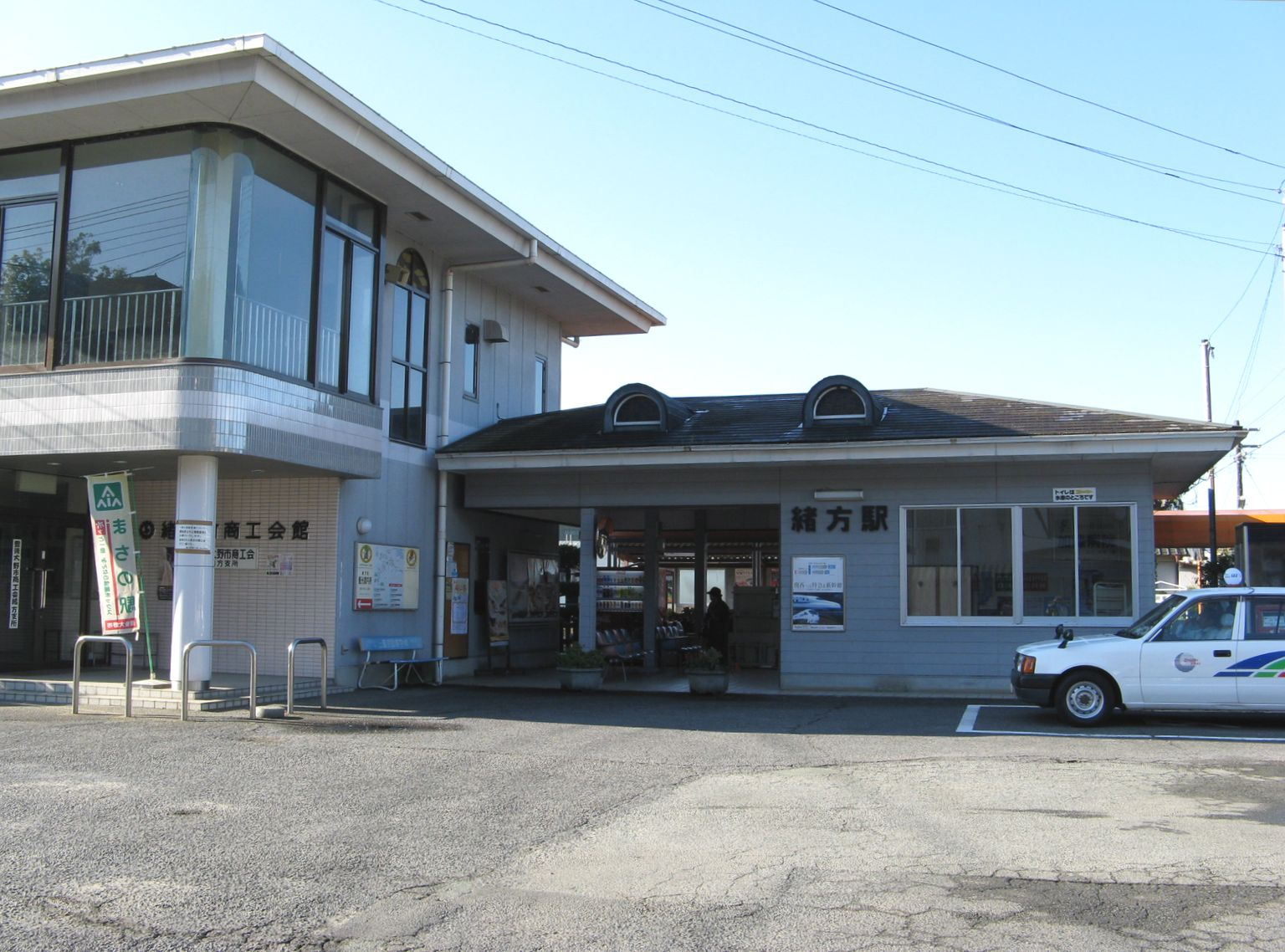
- Ogata Station in 2008

General information
- Location: Ogatamachi Baba, Bungo-Ōno-shi, Ōita-ken 879-6601; Japan
- Coordinates: 32°58′16″N 131°28′36″E
- Operator: JR Kyushu
- Line: ■ Hōhi Main Line
- Distance: 100.3 km from Kumamoto
- Platforms: 2 side platforms
- Tracks: 2 + 1 siding

Construction
- Structure type: At grade

Other information
- Status: Unstaffed
- Website: Official website

History
- Opened: 23 November 1922

Passengers
- FY2015: 206 daily

Services
Preceding station	JR Kyushu	Following station
Asaji towards Kumamoto	Hōhi Main Line	Bungo-Kiyokawa towards Ōita
Location
- Location within Oita Prefecture Location within Japan

Ogata Station (緒方駅, Ogata-eki) is a passenger railway station located in the city of Bungo-Ōno, Ōita Prefecture, Japan. It is operated by JR Kyushu.

== Lines ==
The station is served by the Hōhi Main Line and is located 100.3 km from the starting point of the line at Kumamoto.

== Layout ==
The station consists of two side platforms serving two tracks. The station building is a steel frame structure which houses a waiting room and an automatic ticket vending machine. Access to the opposite side platform is by means of a footbridge.

There is a ticket window in the station building but this became unstaffed in 2016.

=== Platforms ===
1	■ ■ Hōhi Main Line	for Ōita
2	■ ■ Hōhi Main Line	for Bungo-Taketa and Kumamoto

== History ==
Japanese Government Railways (JGR) had opened the Inukai Light Rail Line (犬飼軽便線) (later Inukai Line) from Ōita to Nakahanda on 1 April 1914. The track was extended westwards in phases, with this station opening as the new western terminus on 23 November 1922. Ogata became a through-station on 20 December 1923 when the line was extended to Asaji. By 1928, the track had been extended further west and had linked up with the Miyagi Line (宮地線) reaching eastwards from Kumamoto. On 2 December 1928, the entire track from Kumamoto through Ogata to Ōita was designated as the Hōhi Main Line. With the privatization of Japanese National Railways (JNR), the successor of JGR, on 1 April 1987, the station came under the control of JR Kyushu.

On 17 September 2017, Typhoon Talim (Typhoon 18) damaged the Hōhi Main Line at several locations. Services between Aso and Nakahanda, including Ogata, were suspended and replaced by bus services. Rail service from Aso through Ogata to Miemachi was restored by 22 September 2017 Normal rail services between Aso and Ōita were restored by 2 October 2017.

== Passenger statistics ==
In fiscal 2015, there were a total of 75,033 boarding passengers, giving a daily average of 206 passengers.

== Surrounding area ==
- Bungo Ono City Hall Ogata Branch Office
- Bungo-Ono City Ogata Elementary School
- Bungo-Ono City Ogata Junior High School

== See also ==
- List of railway stations in Japan
