= Takenaka Station =

Railway station in Ōita, Ōita Prefecture, Japan

Takenaka Station 竹中駅
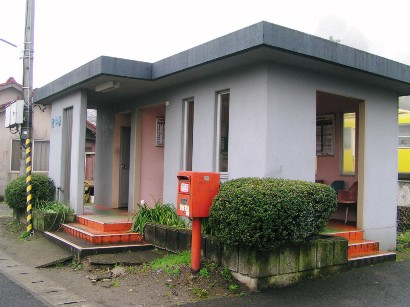
- Takenaka Station in 2005

General information
- Location: Hatanobori, Ōita-shi, Ōita-ken, 879-7502; Japan
- Coordinates: 33°07′18″N 131°38′58″E
- Operator: JR Kyushu
- Line: ■ Hōhi Main Line
- Distance: 130.8 km from Kumamoto
- Platforms: 1 island platform
- Tracks: 2

Construction
- Structure type: At grade
- Cycle facilities: Designated parking area for bikes

Other information
- Status: Unstaffed
- Website: Official website

History
- Opened: 1 September 1916

Passengers
- FY2015: 43 daily

Services
Preceding station	JR Kyushu	Following station
Inukai towards Kumamoto	Hōhi Main Line	Naka-Handa towards Ōita
Location
- Location within Oita Prefecture Location within Japan

Takenaka Station (竹中駅, Takenaka-eki) is a passenger railway station located in Ōita City, Ōita Prefecture, Japan. It is operated by JR Kyushu.

== Lines ==
The station is served by the Hōhi Main Line and is located 130.8 km from the starting point of the line at Kumamoto.

== Layout ==
The station consists of an island platform serving two tracks. The station building is a small modern functional concrete structure which is unstaffed and serves only as a waiting room. Access to the island platform is by means of a level crossing.

=== Platforms ===
1	■ ■ Hōhi Main Line	for Bungo-Taketa and Kumamoto
2	■ ■ Hōhi Main Line	for Ōita

== History ==
Japanese Government Railways (JGR) had opened the Inukai Light Rail Line (犬飼軽便線) (later Inukai Line) from Ōita to Nakahanda on 1 April 1914. In a further phase of expansion, the track was extended westwards, with Takenaka opening as the new western terminus on 1 September 1916. It became a through-station on 20 July 1917 when the track was extended to Inukai. By 1928, the track, extended west in phases, had linked up with the Miyagi Line (宮地線) reaching eastwards from Kumamoto. On 2 December 1928, the entire track from Kumamoto through Takenaka to Ōita was designated as the Hōhi Main Line. With the privatization of Japanese National Railways (JNR), the successor of JGR, on 1 April 1987, the station came under the control of JR Kyushu.

In September 2017, Typhoon Talim (Typhoon 18) damaged the Hōhi Main Line at several locations. Services between Aso and Nakahanda, including Takenaka, were suspended and replaced by bus services. Normal rail services between Aso and Ōita were restored by 2 October 2017.

== Passenger statistics ==
In fiscal 2015, there were a total of 15,632 boarding passengers, giving a daily average of 43 passengers.

== Surrounding area ==
- Ono River
- Oita City Takenaka Elementary School
- Oita City Takenaka Junior High School

== See also ==
- List of railway stations in Japan
