= Asaji Station =

Railway station in Bungo-Ōno, Ōita Prefecture, Japan

Asaji Station 朝地駅
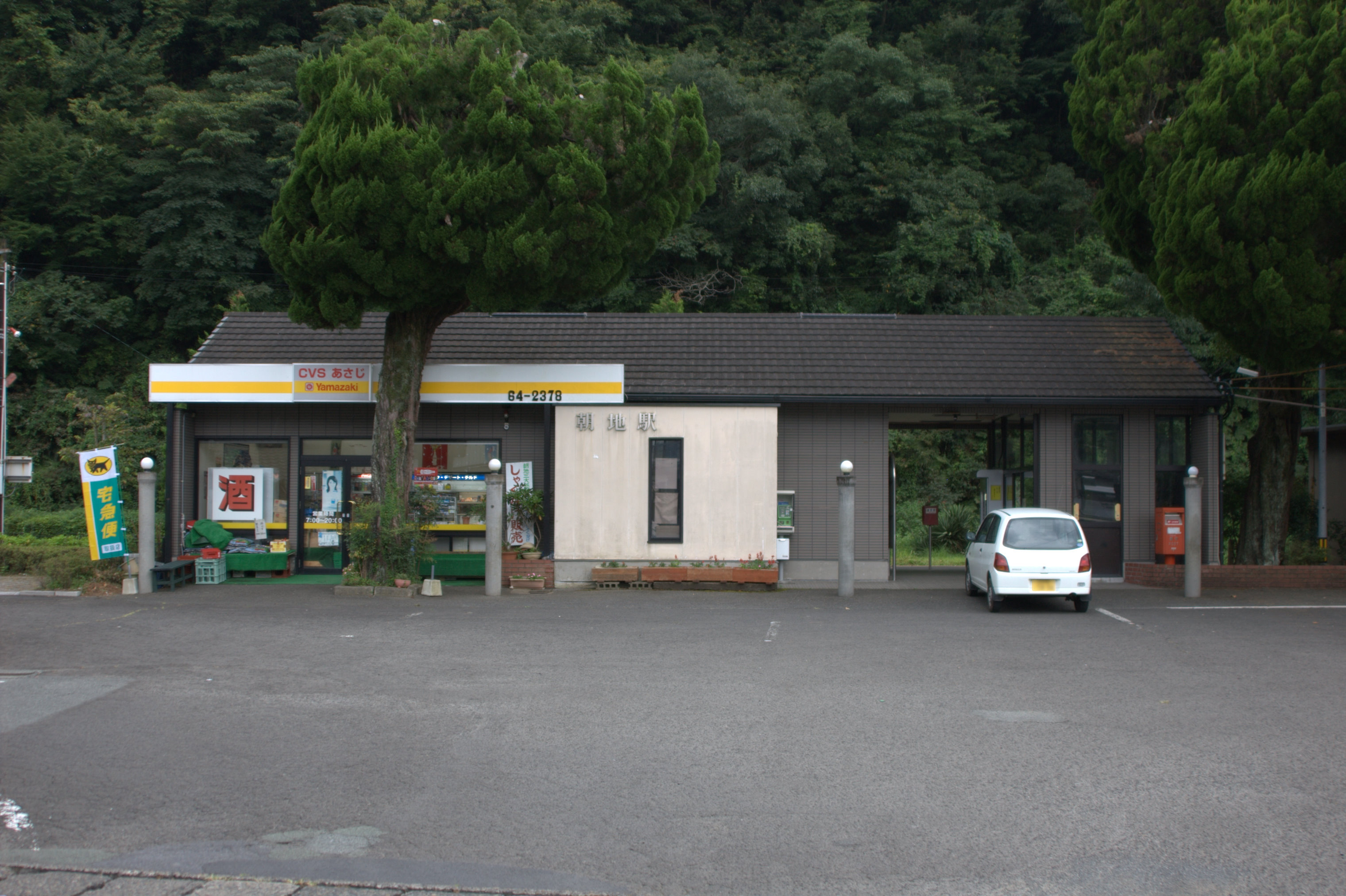
- Asaji Station in 2009

General information
- Location: Asajimachi Tsuboizumi, Bungo-Ōno-shi, Ōita-ken 879-6221; Japan
- Coordinates: 33°00′16″N 131°25′56″E
- Operator: JR Kyushu
- Line: ■ Hōhi Main Line
- Distance: 93.9 km from Kumamoto
- Platforms: 1 side platform
- Tracks: 1

Construction
- Structure type: At grade

Other information
- Status: Unstaffed
- Website: Official website

History
- Opened: 20 December 1923
- Rebuilt: 1993

Passengers
- FY2015: 89 daily

Services
Preceding station	JR Kyushu	Following station
Bungo-Taketa towards Kumamoto	Hōhi Main Line	Ogata towards Ōita
Location
- Location within Oita Prefecture Location within Japan

Asaji Station (朝地駅, Asaji-eki) is a passenger railway station located in the city of Bungo-Ōno, Ōita Prefecture, Japan. It is operated by JR Kyushu.

== Lines ==
The station is served by the Hōhi Main Line and is located 93.9 km from the starting point of the line at Kumamoto.

== Layout ==
The station consists of a side platform serving a single track. The station building is a modern structure but built in traditional Japanese style with a tiled roof. It houses a waiting room, a ticket booth (unstaffed) and the local tourism information centre.

== History ==
Japanese Government Railways (JGR) had opened the Inukai Light Rail Line (犬飼軽便線) (later Inukai Line) from Ōita to Nakahanda on 1 April 1914. The track was extended westwards in phases, with this station opening as the new western terminus on 20 December 1923. Asaji became a through-station on 15 October 1924 when the line was extended to Bungo-Taketa. By 1928, the track had been extended further west and had linked up with the Miyagi Line (宮地線) reaching eastwards from Kumamoto. On 2 December 1928, the entire track from Kumamoto through Asaji to Ōita was designated as the Hōhi Main Line. With the privatization of Japanese National Railways (JNR), the successor of JGR, on 1 April 1987, the station came under the control of JR Kyushu.

The station became unstaffed in 1983. A new station building was completed in 1993.

On 17 September 2017, Typhoon Talim (Typhoon 18) damaged the Hōhi Main Line at several locations. Services between Aso and Nakahanda, including Asaji, were suspended and replaced by bus services. Rail service from Aso through Asaji to Miemachi was restored by 22 September 2017 Normal rail services between Aso and Ōita were restored by 2 October 2017.

== Passenger statistics ==
In fiscal 2015, there were a total of 32,490 boarding passengers, giving a daily average of 89 passengers.

== Surrounding area ==
- Bungo Ono City Hall Asaji Branch Office
- Bungo Ono City Asaji Junior High School
- Bungo Ono City Asaji Elementary School

== See also ==
- List of railway stations in Japan
