= Akamizu Station =

Railway station in Aso, Kumamoto Prefecture, Japan

Akamizu Station 赤水駅
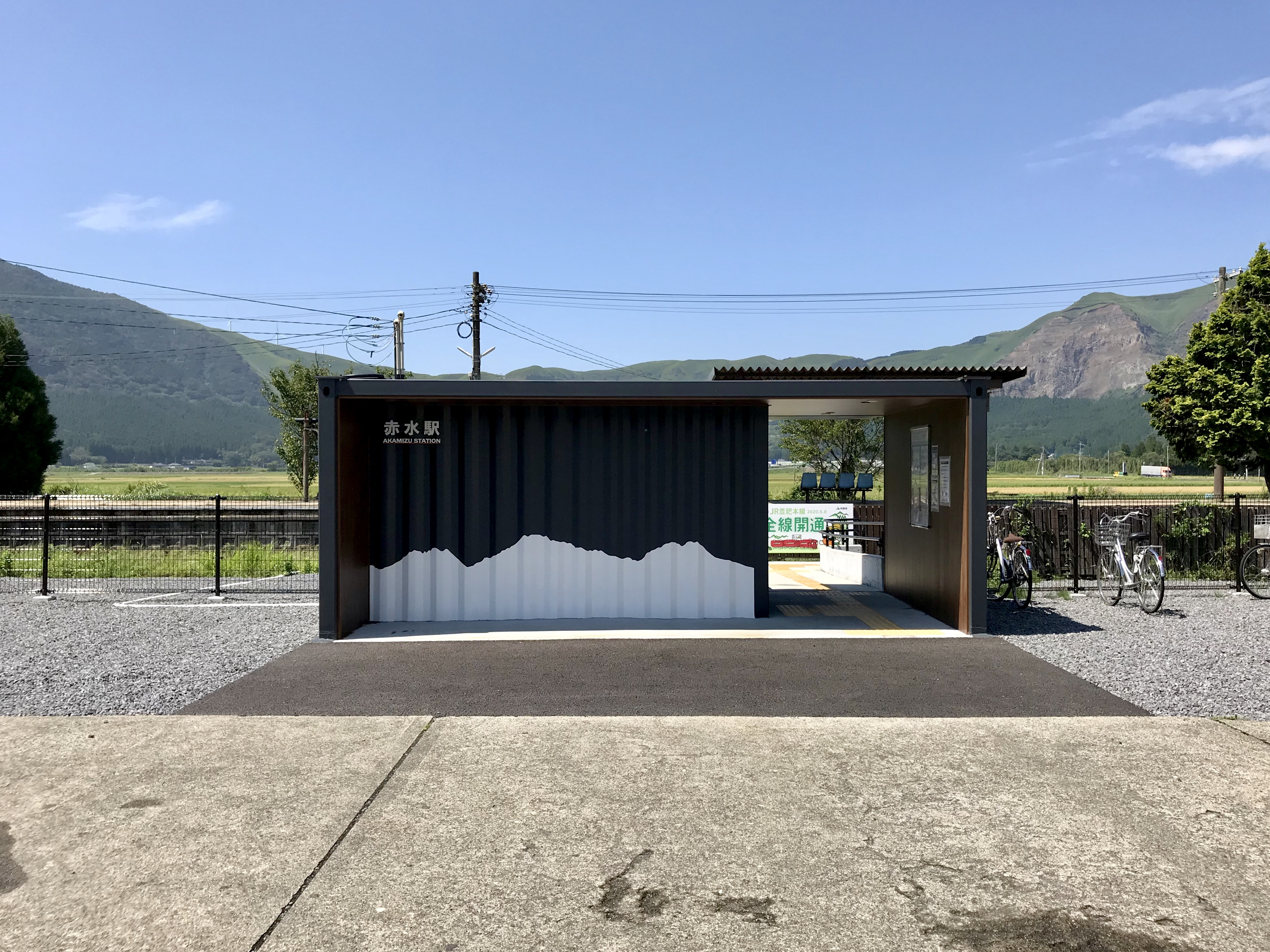
- Akamizu Station in 2020

General information
- Location: Akamizu, Aso-shi, Kumamoto-ken 869-2232; Japan
- Coordinates: 32°54′48″N 130°59′35″E
- Operator: JR Kyushu
- Line: ■ Hōhi Main Line
- Distance: 40.2 km from Kumamoto
- Platforms: 1 island platform
- Tracks: 2 + 1 siding

Construction
- Structure type: At grade

Other information
- Status: Unstaffed
- Website: Official website

History
- Opened: 25 January 1918

Services
| Preceding station | JR Kyushu | Following station |
|---|---|---|
| Tateno towards Kumamoto | Hōhi Main Line | Ichinokawa towards Ōita |
Location
- Location within Kumamoto Prefecture Location within Japan

Akamizu Station (赤水駅, Akamizu-eki) is a passenger railway station located in the city of Aso, Kumamoto, Japan. It Is operated by JR Kyushu.

== Lines ==
The station is served by the Hōhi Main Line and is located 40.2 km from the starting point of the line at Kumamoto.

== Layout ==
The station consists of an island platform serving two tracks at grade with a siding. The platform is accessed by a level crossing. The station building was a wooden structure of traditional Japanese design with a red tiled roof and housed a ticket window and a waiting room. This was damaged by earthquake in 2016 and has since been demolished.

=== Platforms ===
| 1 | ■ ■ Hōhi Main Line | for Kumamoto |
| 2 | ■ ■ Hōhi Main Line | for Aso and Oita |

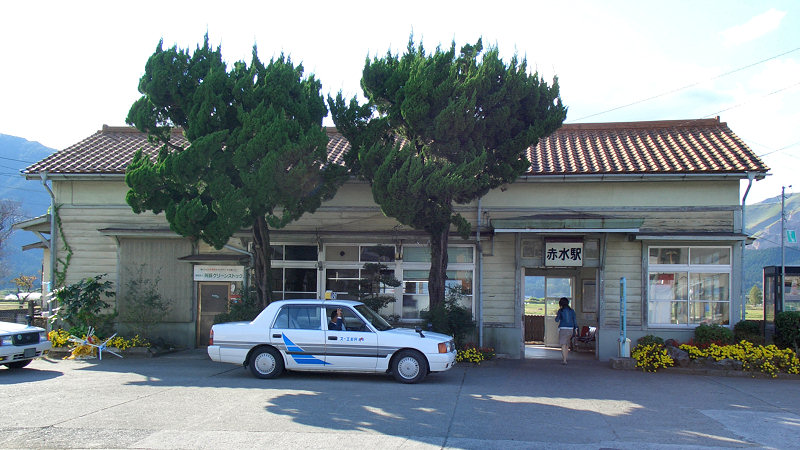
Akamizu Station in 2006, before it had been damaged by earthquake

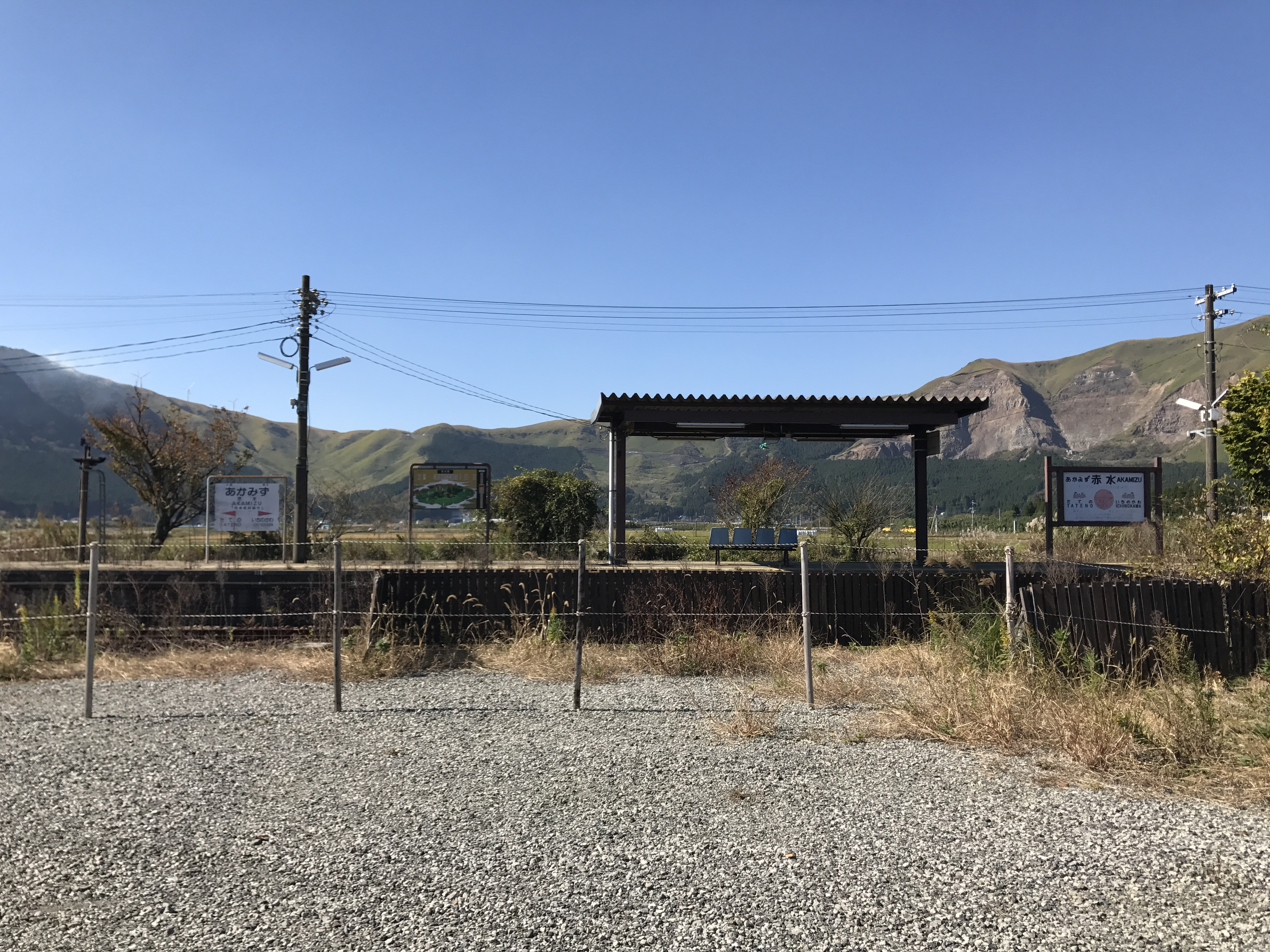
Akamizu one 1 year after the 2016 Kumamoto earthquakes

== History ==
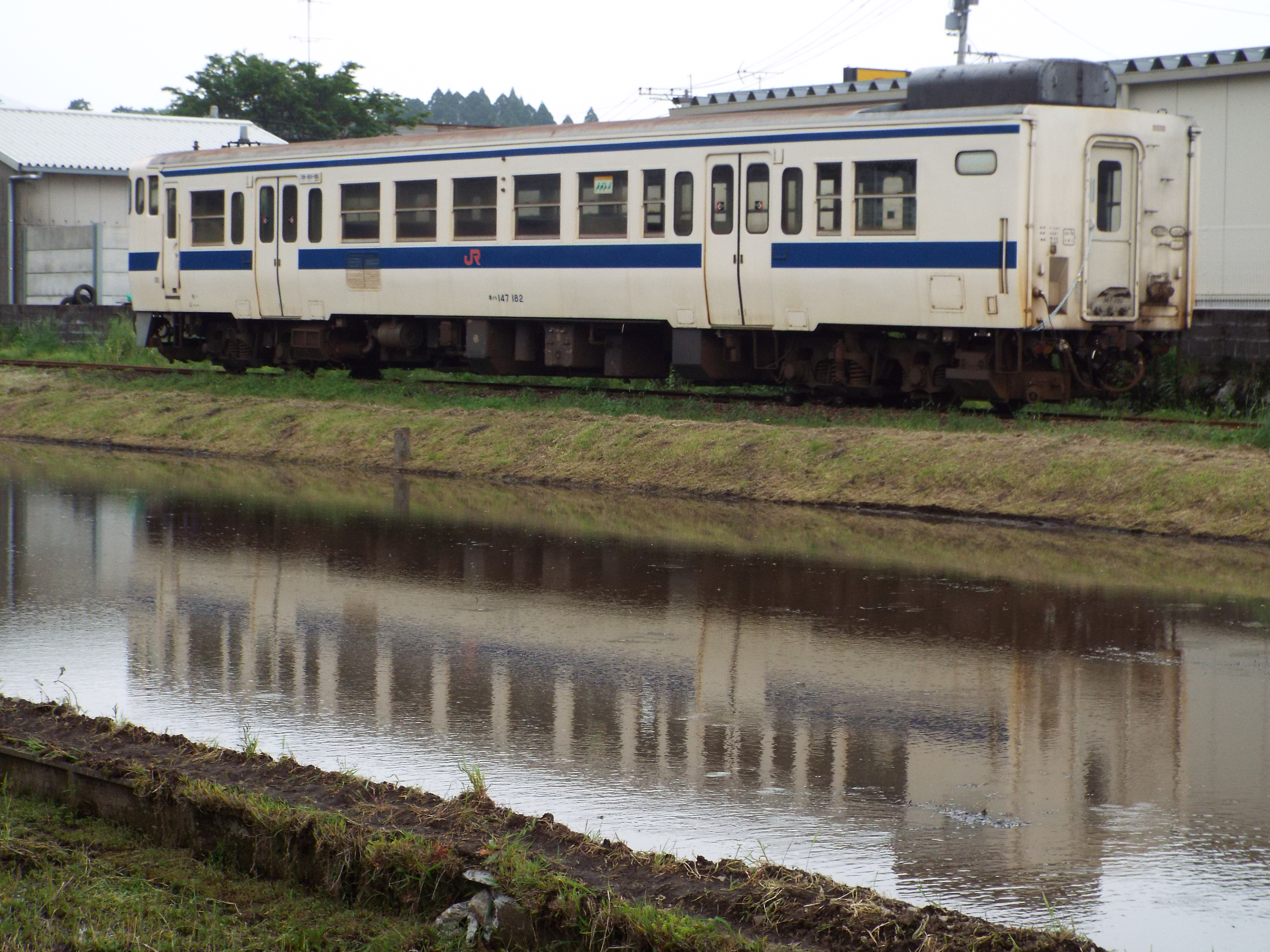
Railway carriage stuck near Akamizu station shortly after the 2016 earthquakes

On 21 June 1914, Japanese Government Railways (JGR) opened the Miyaji Light Rail Line (宮地軽便線) (later the Miyagi Line) from Kumamoto eastwards to Higo-Ōzu. The line was extended eastward in phases and Miyaji was established as the eastern terminal on 25 January 1918. On the same day, Akamizu was opened as an intermediate station on the new track. On 2 December 1928, Miyaji was linked up with Tamarai, the western terminus of the Inukai Line (犬飼線), which had been extended westwards in phases from Ōita since 1914. Through-traffic was established between Kumamoto and Ōita. The two lines were merged and the entire stretch redesignated as the Hōhi Main Line. With the privatization of Japanese National Railways (JNR), the successor of JGR, on 1 April 1987, Akamizu station came under the control of JR Kyushu.

Because of track damage from the 2016 Kumamoto earthquakes, service between Higo-Ōzu to Bungo-Ogi was suspended from April 2016. Service between Aso and Bungo-Ogi was restored by 9 July 2016. The station building at Akamizu was heavily damaged. JR Kyushu declared that the structure was old and unsafe and had it demolished in November 2016. The sector between Higo-Ōzu and Aso remained closed. JR Kyushu commenced the repair work, starting first with the track from Higo-Ōzu to Tateno. On 8 August 2020, JR Kyushu reopened the Higo-Ōzu to Aso section of the line, permitting access between Aso and Kumamoto.

== Surrounding area ==
- Akamizu Post Office
- Aso Akamizu Onsen
- Aso Farm Land

== See also ==
- List of railway stations in Japan
