= Ichinokawa Station =

Railway station in Aso, Kumamoto Prefecture, Japan

Ichinokawa Station 市ノ川駅
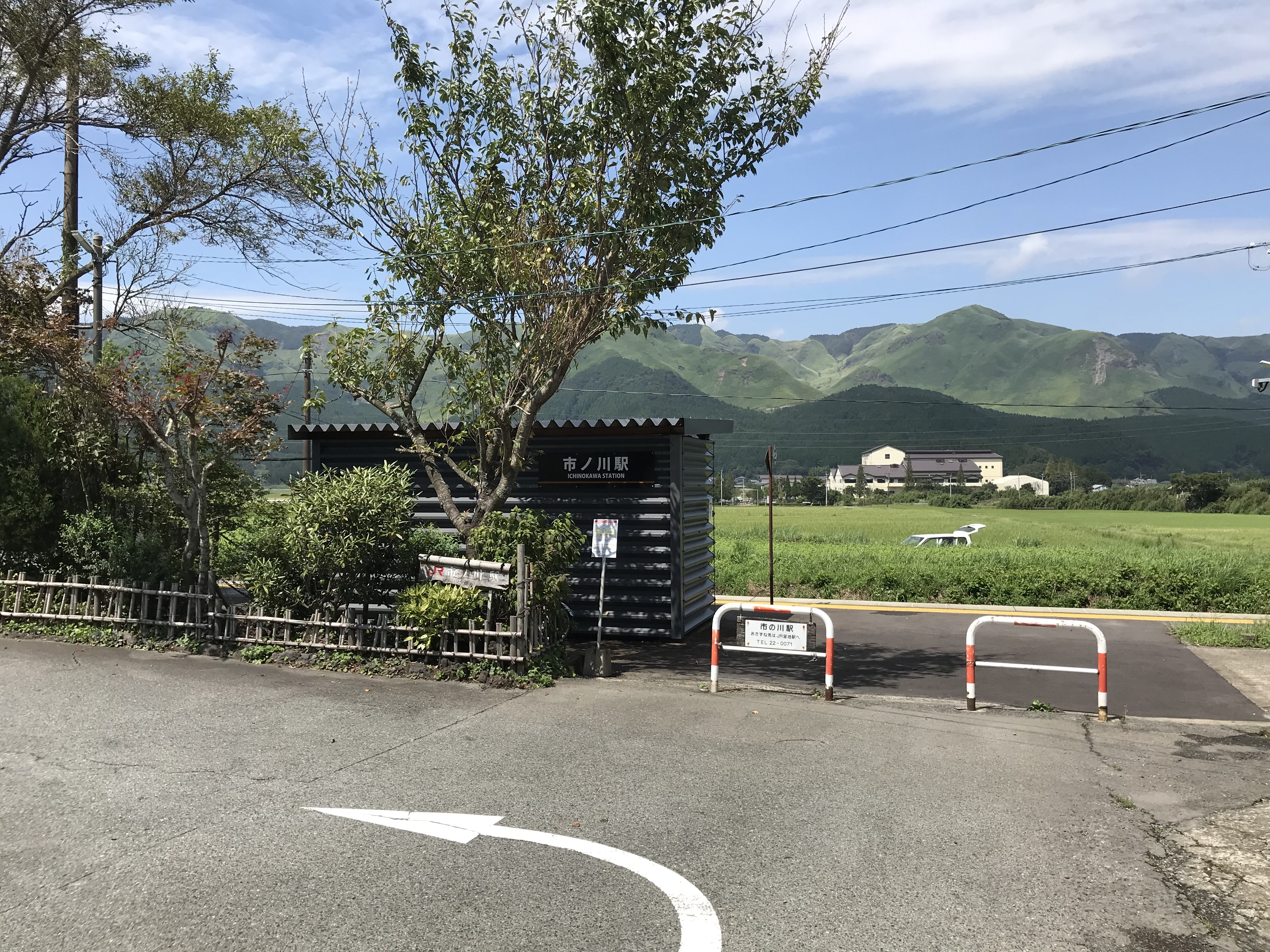
- Ichinokawa Station in 2020

General information
- Location: Nagakusa, Aso-shi, Kumamoto-ken 869-2231; Japan
- Coordinates: 32°55′41″N 131°00′27″E
- Operator: JR Kyushu
- Line: ■ Hōhi Main Line
- Distance: 42.6 km from Kumamoto
- Platforms: 1 side platform
- Tracks: 1

Construction
- Structure type: At grade

Other information
- Status: Unstaffed
- Website: Official website

History
- Opened: 10 March 1960
- Rebuilt: 2016

Services
Preceding station	JR Kyushu	Following station
Akamizu towards Kumamoto	Hōhi Main Line	Uchinomaki towards Ōita
Location
- Location within Kumamoto Prefecture Location within Japan

Ichinokawa Station (市ノ川駅, Ichinokawa-eki) is a passenger railway station located in the city of Aso, Kumamoto, Japan. It Is operated by JR Kyushu.

== Lines ==
The station is served by the Hōhi Main Line and is located 42.6 km from the starting point of the line at Kumamoto.

== Layout ==
The station consists of a side platform serving a single track at grade. There is no station building, only a shelter on the platform for waiting passengers.

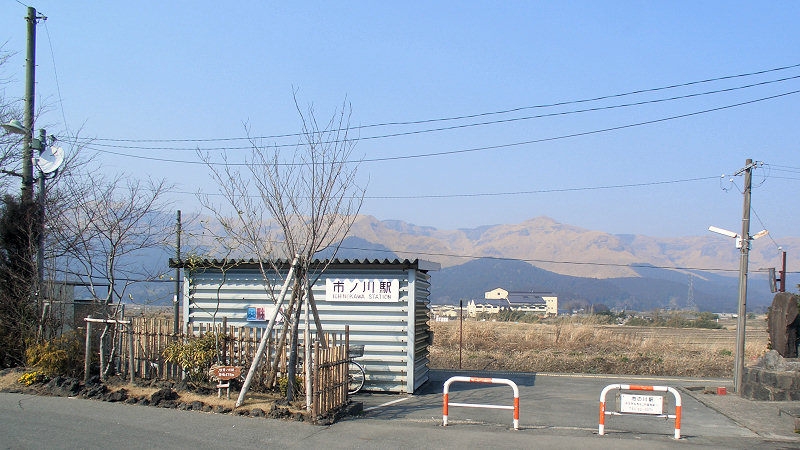
Ichinokawa Station in 2007

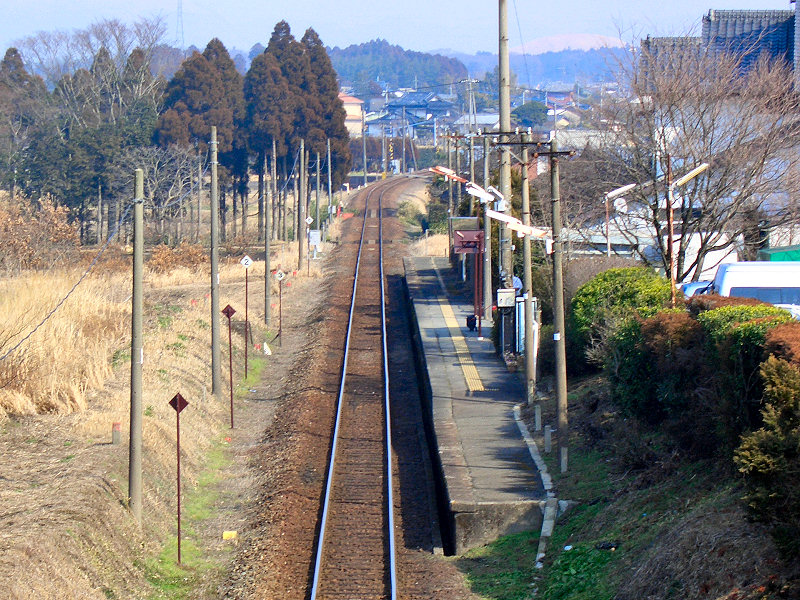
A view of the platform and track.

== History ==
Japanese National Railways (JNR) opened the station on 10 March 1960 as an additional station on the existing track of the Hōhi Main Line. With the privatization of JNR on 1 April 1987, the station came under the control of JR Kyushu.

Because of track damage from the 2016 Kumamoto earthquakes, service between Higo-Ōzu to Bungo-Ogi was suspended from April 2016. Service between Aso and Bungo-Ogi was restored by 9 July 2016. The sector between Higo-Ōzu and Aso remained closed. JR Kyushu commenced the repair work, starting first with the track from Higo-Ōzu to Tateno. On 8 August 2020, JR Kyushu reopened the Higo-Ōzu to Aso section of the line, permitting access between Aso and Kumamoto.

== Surrounding area ==
- Japan National Route 57
- Aso City Asonishi Elementary School

== See also ==
- List of railway stations in Japan
