= Tamarai Station =

Railway station in Taketa, Ōita Prefecture, Japan

Tamarai Station 玉来駅
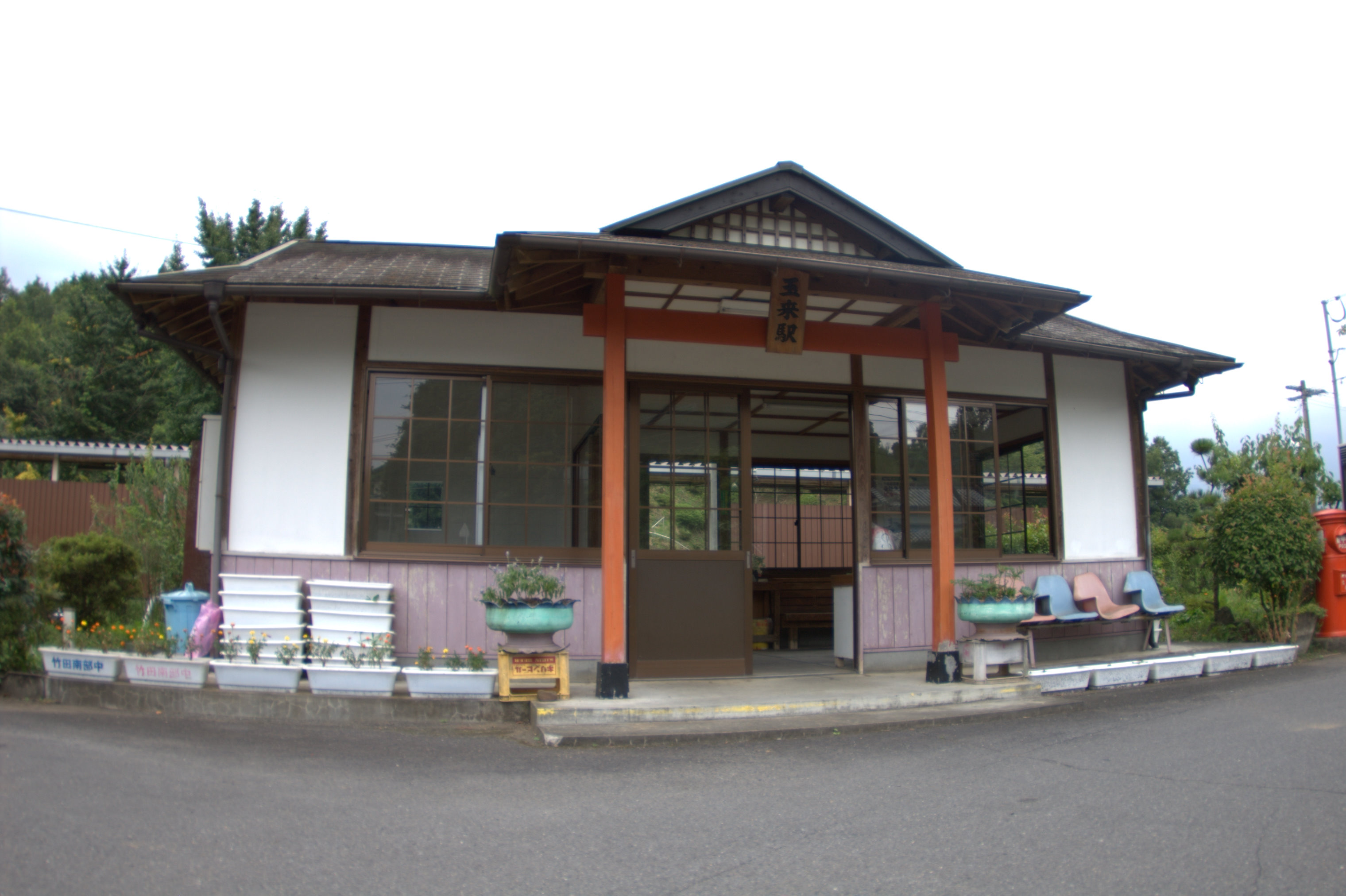
- Tamarai Station in 2009

General information
- Location: Yoshida, aketa-shi, Ōita-ken 878-0035; Japan
- Coordinates: 32°56′53″N 131°22′35″E
- Operator: JR Kyushu
- Line: ■ Hōhi Main Line
- Distance: 84.9 km from Kumamoto
- Platforms: 1 side platform
- Tracks: 1

Construction
- Structure type: At grade

Other information
- Status: Unstaffed
- Website: Official website

History
- Opened: 30 November 1925

Passengers
- FY2015: 13 daily

Services
Preceding station	JR Kyushu	Following station
Bungo-Ogi towards Kumamoto	Hōhi Main Line	Bungo-Taketa towards Ōita
Location
- Location within Oita Prefecture Location within Japan

Tamarai Station (玉来駅, Tamarai-eki) is a passenger railway station located in the city of Taketa, Ōita Prefecture, Japan. It is operated by JR Kyushu.

== Lines ==
The station is served by the Hōhi Main Line and is located 84.9 km from the starting point of the line at Kumamoto.

== Layout ==
The station consists of a side platform serving a single track at grade. The station building is wooden structure of traditional Japanese design built to resemble a Shinto shrine. It is unstaffed and serves only to house a waiting area.

== History ==
Japanese Government Railways (JGR) had opened the Inukai Light Rail Line (犬飼軽便線) (later Inukai Line) from Ōita to Nakahanda on 1 April 1914. The track was extended westwards in phases, with this station opening as the new western terminus on 30 November 1925. On 2 December 1928, Tamarai was linked up with Miyagi, the eastern terminus of the Miyagi Line (宮地線), which had been extended eastwards from Kumamoto since 1914. Through-traffic was established between Kumamoto and Ōita. The two lines were merged and the entire stretch redesignated as the Hōhi Main Line. With the privatization of Japanese National Railways (JNR), the successor of JGR, on 1 April 1987, the station came under the control of JR Kyushu.

On 17 September 2017, Typhoon Talim (Typhoon 18) damaged the Hōhi Main Line at several locations. Services between Aso and Nakahanda, including Tamarai, were suspended and replaced by bus services. Rail service from Aso through this station to Miemachi was restored by 22 September 2017 Normal rail services between Aso and Ōita were restored by 2 October 2017.

== Passenger statistics ==
In fiscal 2015, there were a total of 4,899 boarding passengers, giving a daily average of 13 passengers.

== Surrounding area ==
The station is in a rural area. It is 400 meters along the prefectural road in front of the station to the urban area (Tamarai district)

== See also ==
- List of railway stations in Japan
