= Bungo-Ogi Station =

Railway station in Taketa, Ōita Prefecture, Japan

Bungo-Ogi Station 豊後荻駅
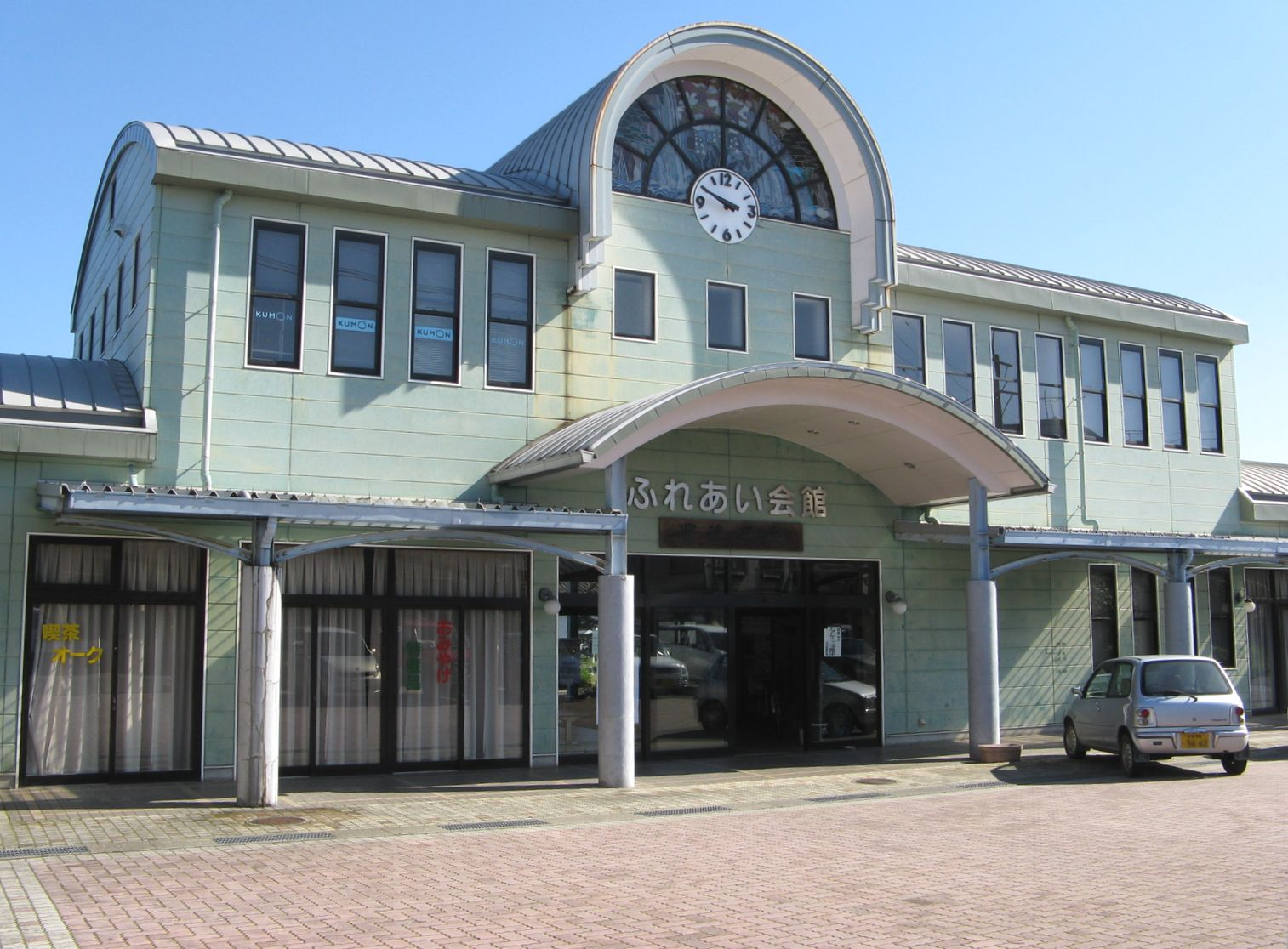
- Bungo-Ogi Station in 2008

General information
- Location: Ogimachibaba, Taketa-shi, Ōita-ken 879-6115; Japan
- Coordinates: 32°55′37″N 131°17′52″E
- Operator: JR Kyushu
- Line: ■ Hōhi Main Line
- Distance: 75.2 km from Kumamoto
- Platforms: 2 side platforms
- Tracks: 2 + 1 siding

Construction
- Structure type: At grade

Other information
- Status: Kan'i itaku agent on site
- Website: Official website

History
- Opened: 2 December 1928

Passengers
- FY2015: 46 daily

Services
Preceding station	JR Kyushu	Following station
Takimizu towards Kumamoto	Hōhi Main Line	Tamarai towards Ōita
Location
- Location within Oita Prefecture Location within Japan

Bungo-Ogi Station (豊後荻駅, Bungo-Ogi-eki) is a passenger railway station located in the city of Taketa, Ōita Prefecture, Japan. It is operated by JR Kyushu.

== Lines ==
The station is served by the Hōhi Main Line and is located 75.2 km from the starting point of the line at Kumamoto.

== Layout ==
The station consists of two side platforms serving two tracks at grade with a siding. The station building is two-storey modern structure which also houses a local community centre. Access to the opposite side platform is by means of a level crossing. The station is unstaffed by JR Kyushu but some types of tickets are available from the ticket window which is staffed by a kan'i itaku agent.

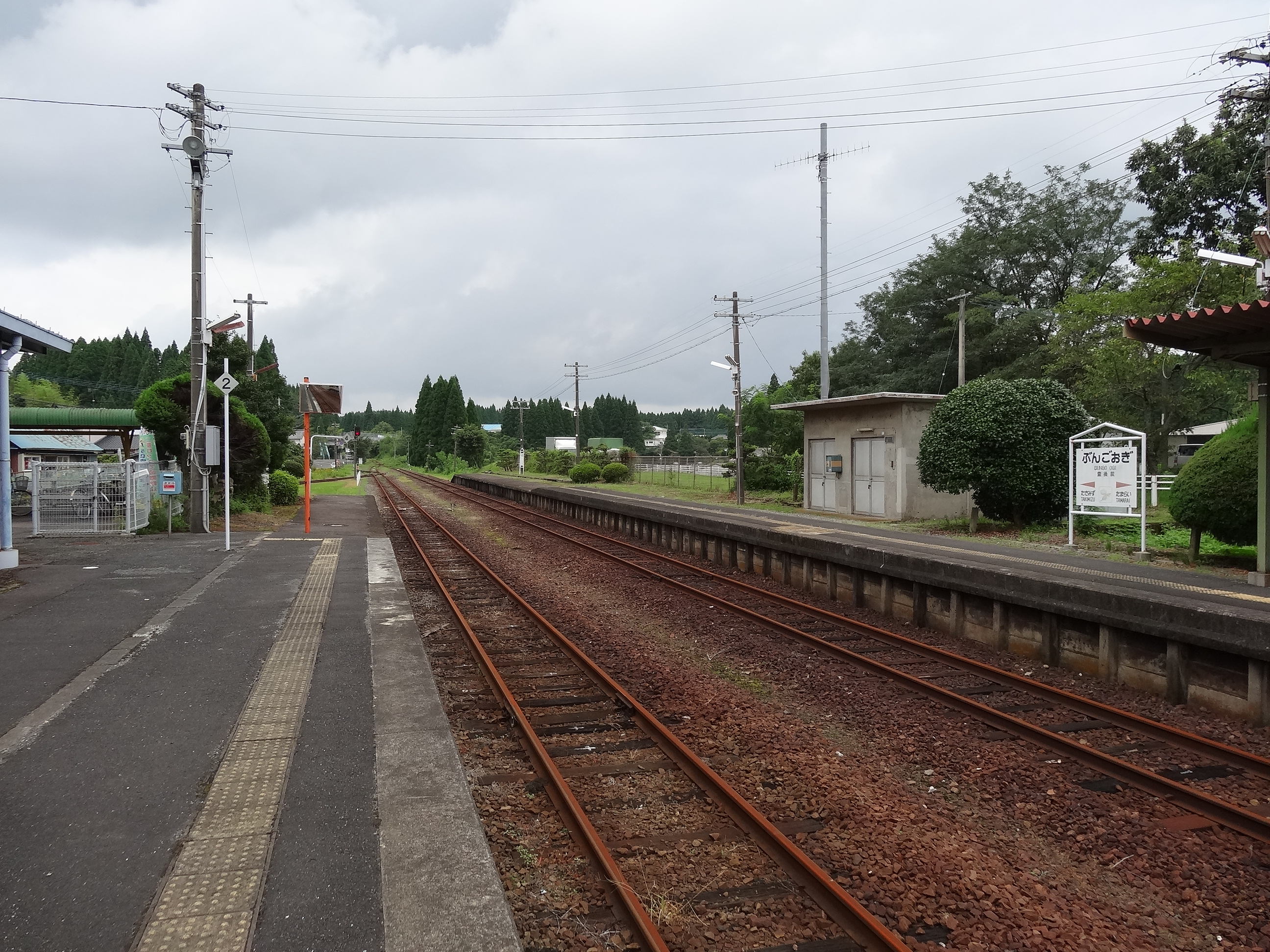
A view of the platforms and tracks. The siding can be seen in the distance, branching off to the left.

== History ==
Japanese Government Railways (JGR) had opened the Inukai Light Rail Line (犬飼軽便線) (later Inukai Line) from Ōita to Nakahanda on 1 April 1914. The track was extended westwards in phases, with Tamarai being established as its western terminus on 30 November 1925. Further to the west, JGR had, on 21 June 1914 opened the Miyaji Light Rail Line (宮地軽便線) (later the Miyaji Line) from Kumamoto east to Higo-Ōzu. This track was also extended in phases, reaching Miyaji as its eastern terminus on 25 January 1918. On 2 December 1928, Miyaji and Tamarai were linked up, with Bungo-Ogi opening on the same day as one of several intermediate stations along the new track. Through-traffic was established between Kumamoto and Ōita. The Inukai and Miyaji lines were merged and the entire stretch redesignated as the Hōhi Main Line. With the privatization of Japanese National Railways (JNR), the successor of JGR, on 1 April 1987, Bungo-Ogi came under the control of JR Kyushu.

On 17 September 2017, Typhoon Talim (Typhoon 18) damaged the Hōhi Main Line at several locations. Services between Aso and Nakahanda, including Bungo-Ogi, were suspended and replaced by bus services. Rail service from Aso through this station to Miemachi was restored by 22 September 2017 Normal rail services between Aso and Ōita were restored by 2 October 2017.

== Passenger statistics ==
In fiscal 2015, there were a total of 16,821 boarding passengers, giving a daily average of 46 passengers.

== Surrounding area ==
- Hakusui Falls
- Takeda City Ogi Elementary School
- Takeda City Midorigaoka Junior High School
- Takeda City Ogi Branch

== See also ==
- List of railway stations in Japan
