= Bungo-Taketa Station =

Railway station in Taketa, Ōita Prefecture, Japan

Bungo-Taketa Station 豊後竹田駅
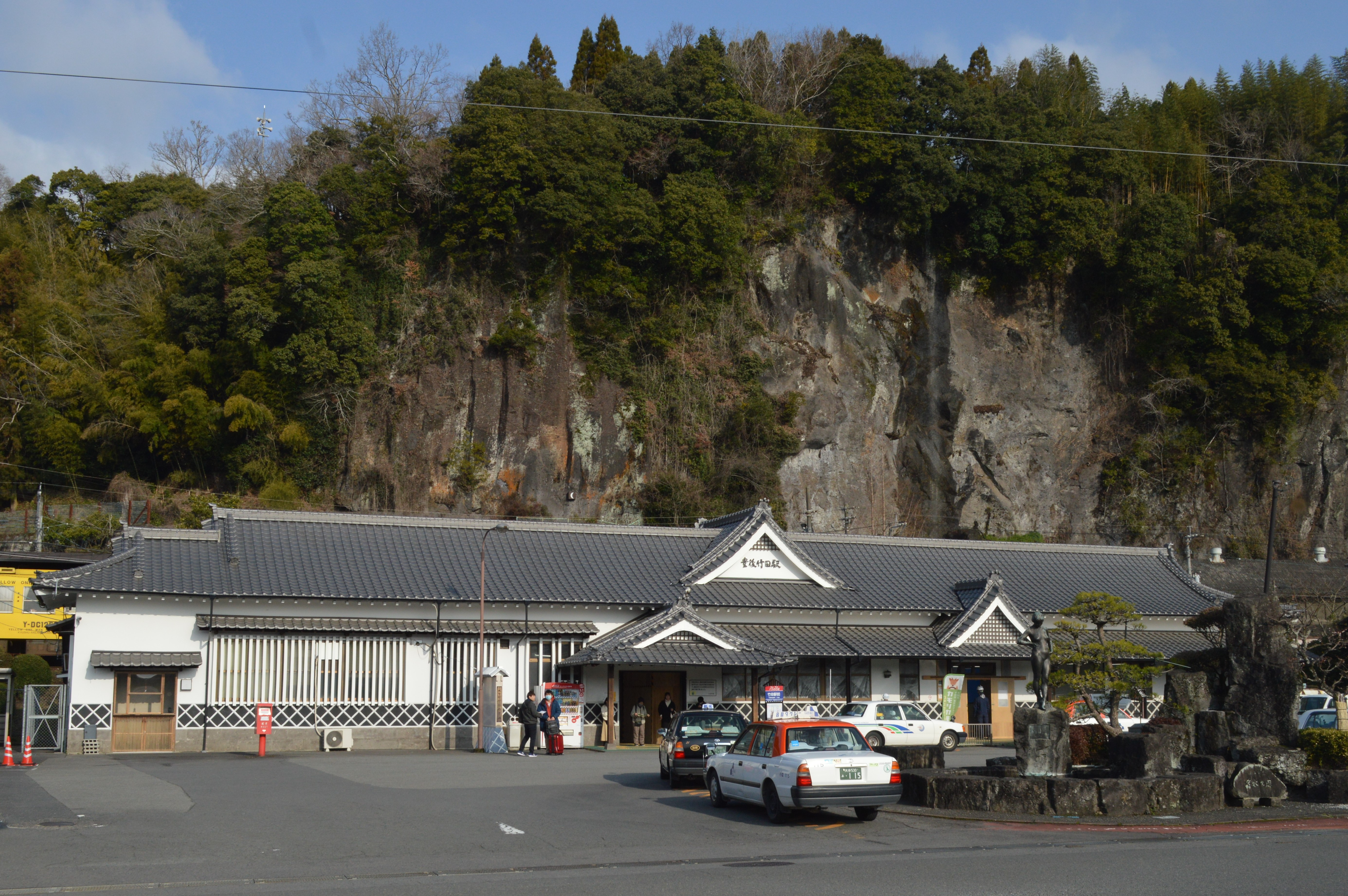
- Bungo-Taketa Station in 2024

General information
- Location: Aiai, Taketa-shi, Ōita-ken 878-0011; Japan
- Coordinates: 32°58′15″N 131°23′24″E
- Operator: JR Kyushu
- Line: ■ Hōhi Main Line
- Distance: 88.0 km from Kumamoto
- Platforms: 1 island platform
- Tracks: 2 + numerous sidings

Construction
- Structure type: Side hill cutting

Other information
- Status: Staffed (Midori no Madoguchi)
- Website: Official website

History
- Opened: 15 October 1924
- Former names: Bungo-Takeda (until 1 October 1969)

Passengers
- FY2016: 375 daily
- Rank: 277th (among JR Kyushu stations)

Services
Preceding station	JR Kyushu	Following station
Tamarai towards Kumamoto	Hōhi Main Line	Asaji towards Ōita
Location
- Location within Oita Prefecture Location within Japan

Bungo-Taketa Station (豊後竹田駅, Bungo-Taketa-eki) is a passenger railway station located in the city of Taketa, Ōita Prefecture, Japan. It is operated by JR Kyushu.

== Lines ==
The station is served by the Hōhi Main Line and is located 88.0 km from the starting point of the line at Kumamoto.

== Layout ==
The station consists of an island platform serving two tracks on a side hill cutting. The station building is a wooden structure of traditional Japanese design located at a lower level. It houses a waiting room and a JR Kyushu Midori no Madoguchi staffed ticket window. Access to the platform is by means of an underpass which leads beneath and up to the platform. Several sidings run to the north of the platform.

=== Platforms ===
1, 2	■ ■ Hōhi Main Line	for Miyaji, Higo-Ōzu and Kumamoto for Ōita

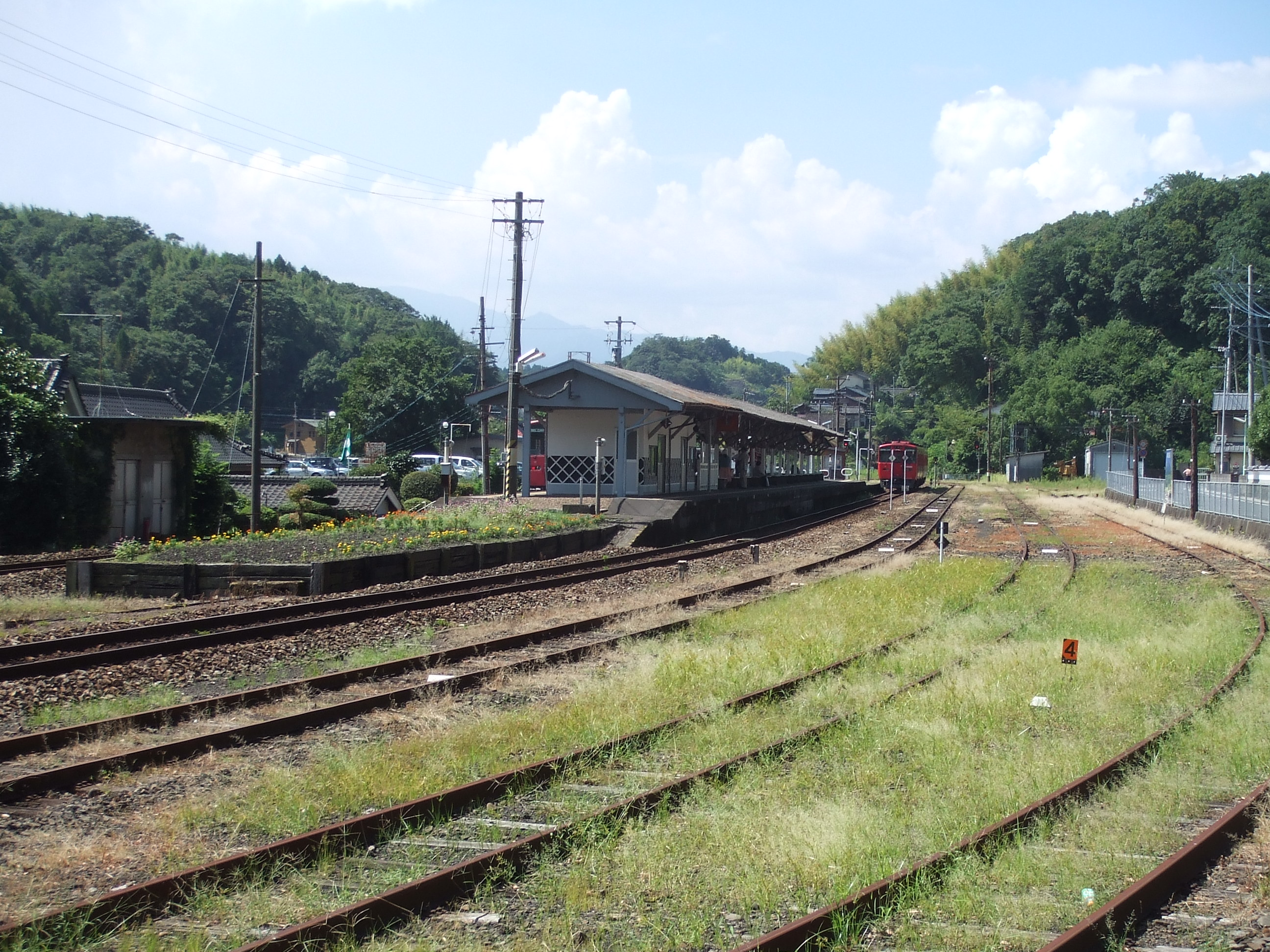
A view of the sidings north of the platform.

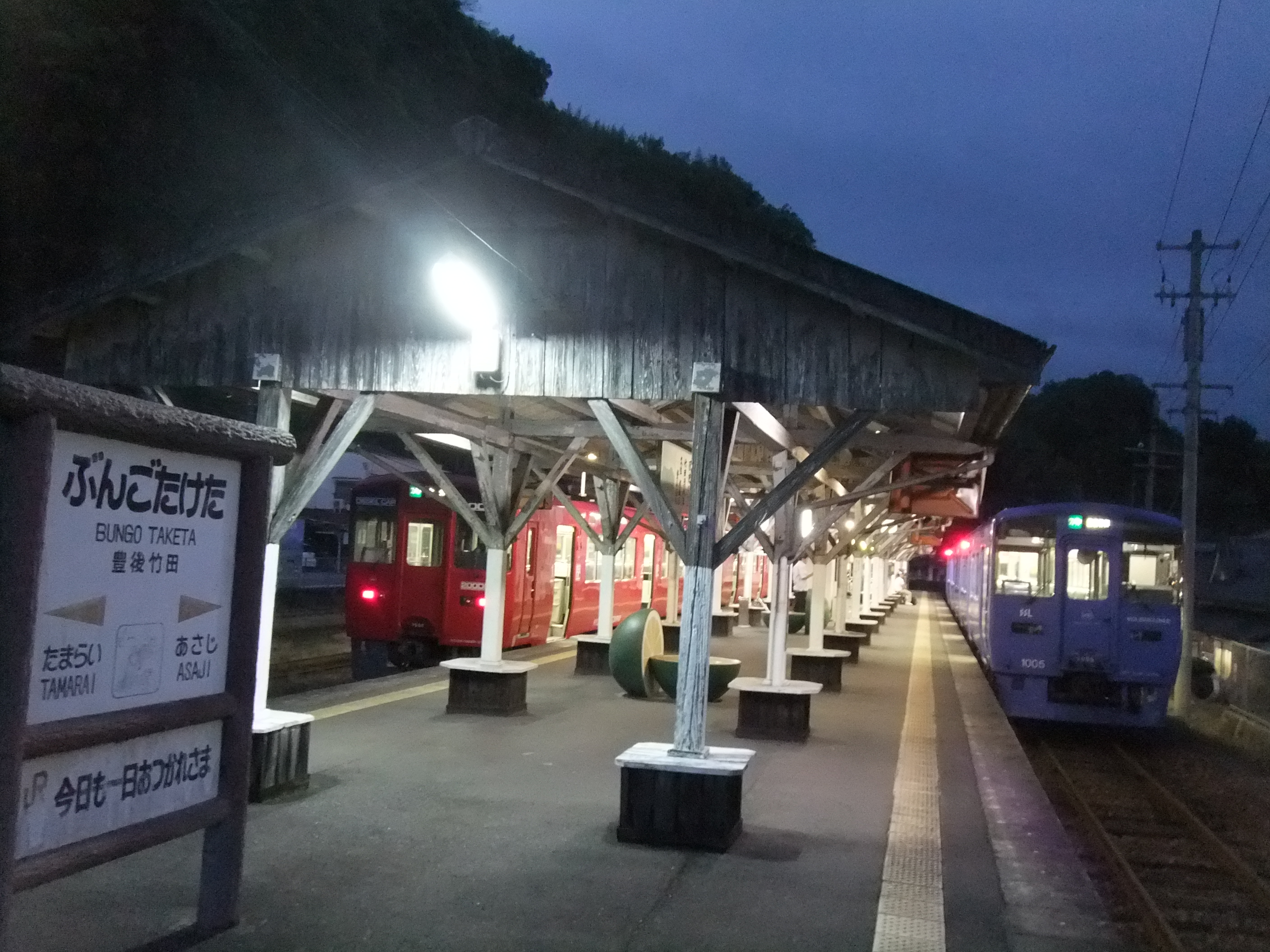
Platform at night

== History ==
Japanese Government Railways (JGR) had opened the Inukai Light Rail Line (犬飼軽便線) (later Inukai Line) from Ōita to Nakahanda on 1 April 1914. The track was extended westwards in phases, with this station opening as the new western terminus on 15 October 1924 with the name Bungo-Takeda (same kanji characters but with a different reading). It became a through-station on 30 November 1925 when the line was extended to Tamarai. By 1928, the track had been extended further west and had linked up with the Miyagi Line (宮地線) reaching eastwards from Kumamoto. On 2 December 1928, the entire track from Kumamoto through this station to Ōita was designated as the Hōhi Main Line. On 1 October 1969, the reading of the station name was changed to Bungo-Taketa, with no change to the Kanji characters. With the privatization of Japanese National Railways (JNR), the successor of JGR, on 1 April 1987, the station came under the control of JR Kyushu.

On 17 September 2017, Typhoon Talim (Typhoon 18) damaged the Hōhi Main Line at several locations. Services between Aso and Nakahanda, including Bungo-Taketa, were suspended and replaced by bus services. Rail service from Aso through this station to Miemachi was restored by 22 September 2017 Normal rail services between Aso and Ōita were restored by 2 October 2017.

== Passenger statistics ==
In fiscal 2016, the station was used by an average of 375 passengers daily (boarding passengers only), and it ranked 277th among the busiest stations of JR Kyushu.

== Surrounding area ==
- Takeda City Hall

== See also ==
- List of railway stations in Japan
