= Naka-Handa Station =

Railway station in Ōita, Ōita Prefecture, Japan

Naka-Handa Station 中判田駅
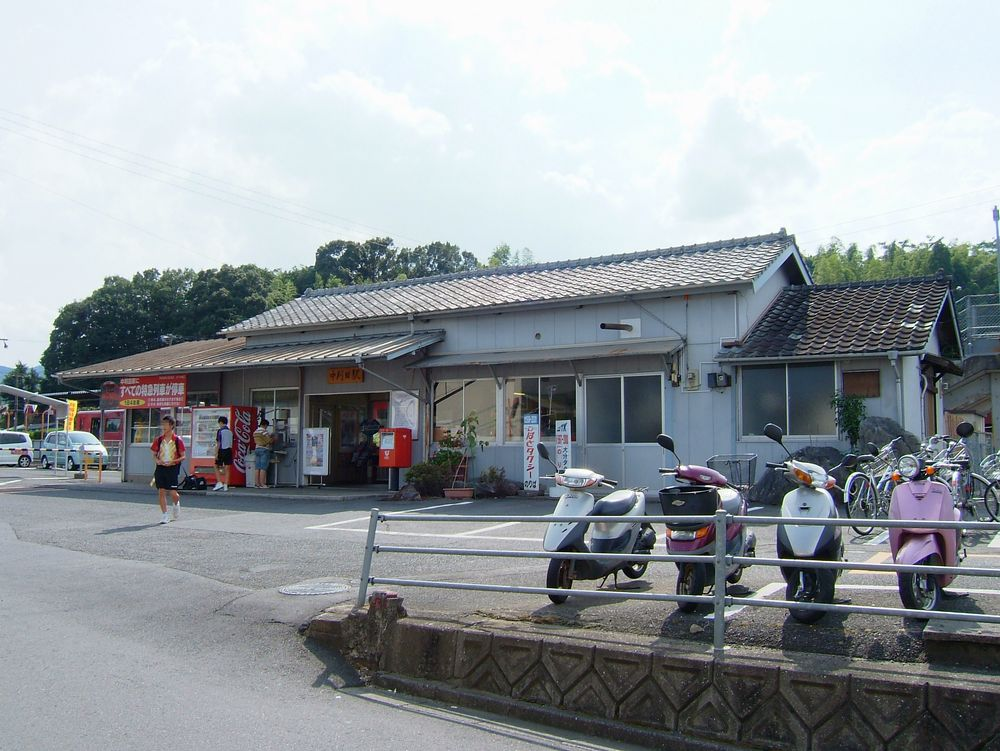
- Naka-Handa Station in 2006

General information
- Location: 871-876 Nakahanda, Ōita-shi, Ōita-ken, 870-1113; Japan
- Coordinates: 33°09′52″N 131°38′20″E
- Operator: JR Kyushu
- Line: ■ Hōhi Main Line
- Distance: 136.3 km from Kumamoto
- Platforms: 1 island platform
- Tracks: 2 + 1 siding

Construction
- Structure type: At grade
- Cycle facilities: Designated parking area for bikes
- Accessible: Yes - level crossing and footbridge

Other information
- Status: Unstaffed station Remote support available
- Website: Official website

History
- Opened: 1 April 1914

Passengers
- FY2016: 950 daily
- Rank: 172nd (among JR Kyushu stations)

Services
Preceding station	JR Kyushu	Following station
Takenaka towards Kumamoto	Hōhi Main Line	Ōita-Daigaku-mae towards Ōita
Location
- Location within Oita Prefecture Location within Japan

Naka-Handa Station (中判田駅, Naka-Handa-eki) is a passenger railway station located in Ōita City, Ōita Prefecture, Japan. It is operated by JR Kyushu.

== Lines ==
The station is served by the Hōhi Main Line and is located 136.3 km from the starting point of the line at Kumamoto.

== Layout ==
The station consists of an island platform serving two tracks. The station building is an old wooden structure and houses a waiting area, a staffed ticket window, a SUGOCA charge machine and a SUGOCA card reader. Access to the island platform is by means of a footbridge.

The station is unstaffed, but there is an automatic ticket vending machine.

=== Platforms ===
1	■ ■ Hōhi Main Line	for Bungo-Taketa and Kumamoto
2	■ ■ Hōhi Main Line	for Ōita

== History ==
Japanese Government Railways (JGR) opened the station on 1 April 1914 as the western terminus of its Inukai Light Rail Line (犬飼軽便線) (later Inukai Line) from Ōita. Naka-Handa became a through-station on 1 September 1916 when the track was extended further west to Takenaka. By 1928, the track had, extended west in phases, had linked up with the Miyagi Line (宮地線) reaching eastwards from Kumamoto. On 2 December 1928, the entire track from Kumamoto through Naka-Handa to Ōita was designated as the Hōhi Main Line. With the privatization of Japanese National Railways (JNR), the successor of JGR, on 1 April 1987, Naka-Handa came under the control of JR Kyushu.

In September 2017, Typhoon Talim (Typhoon 18) damaged the Hōhi Main Line at several locations. Services between Aso and Naka-Handa were suspended and replaced by bus services. Rail services were resumed on 2 October 2017.

JR Kyushu had planned to convert Naka-Handa (with several other stations in Ōita City) into an unstaffed, remotely-managed "Smart Support Station" by 17 March 2018 but after opposition from users, this was postponed, pending works to improve accessibility. It was then introduced on July 1, 2023.

== Passenger statistics ==
In fiscal 2016, the station was used by an average of 950 passengers daily (boarding passengers only), and it ranked 172nd among the busiest stations of JR Kyushu.

== Surrounding area ==
- Tojigawara Battlefield Site
- Oita Prefectural Oita Minami High School
- Oita City Handa Junior High School
- Oita City Handa Elementary School

== See also ==
- List of railway stations in Japan
