= List of storms named Talim =

The name Talim (Tagalog: talim, [tɐˈlɪm]) has been used for four tropical cyclones in the western North Pacific Ocean. The name was contributed by the Philippines and means the "sharp, piercing edge of a blade" in Tagalog.

- Typhoon Talim (2005) (T0513, 13W, Isang) - a strong Category 4 super typhoon that made landfall in Taiwan and China.
- Severe Tropical Storm Talim (2012) (T1205, 06W, Carina) - affected Taiwan.
- Typhoon Talim (2017) (T1718, 20W, Lannie) - a powerful Category 4 typhoon that made landfall on Kyushu.
- Severe Tropical Storm Talim (2023) (T2304, 04W, Dodong) - a Category 1 typhoon that affected the Philippines and Southern China.

Preceded by Guchol	Pacific typhoon season names Talim	Succeeded by Bori
