= List of fictional assassins and bounty hunters =

This is a list of fictional assassins and bounty hunters.

Character	Work	Creator	Country of publication	Ref.
4-LOM	Star Wars	George Lucas	United States	
Pasquale Acosta	Smokin' Aces	Joe Carnahan	United States	
Adrenalynn	The Tenth	Tony Daniel	United States	
Morrigan Aensland	Darkstalkers	Capcom	Japan	
Agent 47	Hitman	IO Interactive	Denmark	
Spencer Aimes	Killers	Bob DeRosa	United States	
Sofia Al-Azwar	John Wick: Chapter 3 – Parabellum	Derek Kolstad, Shay Hatten, Chris Collins, Marc Abrams	United States	
Raza Hamidmi Al-Wazar	Iron Man	Mark Fergus, Hawk Ostby, Art Marcum and Matt Holloway	United States	
Lord Alamout	Comics' Greatest World / Dark Horse Comics	Steven Grant, Team CGW	United States	
Patroklos Alexander	Soulcalibur V	Namco	Japan	
Johnny Alpha	Strontium Dog	John Wagner and Carlos Ezquerra	United Kingdom	
Mickey Altieri	Scream 2	Kevin Williamson	United States	
Alucard	Hellsing	Kouta Hirano	United States	
Amanaman	Star Wars	George Lucas	United States	
Osiris Amanpour	Machete	Robert Rodriguez, Álvaro Rodriguez	United States	
Sean Ambrose	Mission Impossible 2	Robert Towne	United States	
Aphrodite IX	Top Cow	David Wohl, David Finch	United States	
Samus Aran	Metroid	Makoto Kano	Japan	
Sterling Archer	Archer	Adam Reed	United States	
Assassin X	Danger Girl	J. Scott Campbell, Andy Hartnell	United States	
Corvo Attano	Dishonored	Arkane Studios, Bethesda Softworks	United States	
Jarlaxle Baenre	Forgotten Realms	R.A. Salvatore	United States	
Sergeant Ballard	Outland	Peter Hyams	United States	
Miguel Bain	Assassins	The Wachowskis and Brian Helgeland	United States	
Cad Bane	Star Wars	George Lucas, Dave Filoni, and Henry Gilroy	United States	
Bucky Barnes	Marvel Comics	Joe Simon, Jack Kirby	United States	
Ramon Bax	Schneider vs Bax	Alex van Warmerdam	Netherlands, Belgium	
Bear, aka Ursa	Arrow	Various	United States	
Tom Beckett	Sniper	Michael Frost Beckner, Crash Leyland	United States	
Barry Berkman	Barry	Alec Berg, Bill Hader	United States	
Yelena Belova	Marvel Cinematic Universe	Cate Shortland	United States	
Rod Bender	Dick Tracy	Chester Gould	United States	
Mr. Benedict	Last Action Hero	Shane Black, David Arnott	United States	
Bennett	Commando	Joseph Loeb III, Matthew Weisman, Steven E. de Souza	United States	
Bill, aka "Snakecharmer"	Kill Bill	Quentin Tarantino	United States	
Mercury Black	RWBY	Monty Oum	United States	
Black Krrsantan	Star Wars	Kieron Gillen and Salvador Larroca	United States	
Black Noir	The Boys	Eric Kripke	United States	
Black Star	Soul Eater	Atsushi Ohkubo	Japan	
Martin Q. Blank	Grosse Pointe Blank	Tom Jankiewicz, D. V. DeVincentis, Steve Pink and John Cusack	United States	
Bloodshot	Valiant Comics	Kevin VanHook, Don Perlin, Bob Layton	United States	
Bloodsport	DC Comics	John Byrne	United States	
Mack Bolan	The Executioner	Don Pendleton	United States	
Ramsay Bolton	A Song of Ice and Fire	George R. R. Martin	United States	
Sy Borgman	Harley Quinn	Justin Halpern	United States	
Danz Borin	Star Wars	George Lucas	United States	
Boris the Animal	Men in Black 3	Etan Cohen	United States	
Bossk	Star Wars	George Lucas	United States	
Bella Donna Boudreaux	Marvel Comics	Scott Lobdell and Jim Lee	United States	
Mireille Bouquet	Noir	Ryōe Tsukimura	Japan	
Boushh	Star Wars	George Lucas	United States	
Ellen Brandt	Marvel Cinematic Universe	Shane Black and Drew Pearce	United States	
The Bride, aka "Black Mamba"	Kill Bill	Quentin Tarantino	United States	
Mitchell Braddock	The Hit	Peter Prince	United States	
Nicholas Brody	Homeland	Alex Gansa	United States	
Bronn	A Song of Ice and Fire	George R. R. Martin	United States	
Michael Bryce Jr	The Hitman's Bodyguard	Tom O'Connor	United States	
Budd, aka "Sidewinder"	Kill Bill	Quentin Tarantino	United States	
Bullet-Tooth Tony	Snatch	Guy Ritchie	United States	
Bullfrog	Captain Laserhawk: A Blood Dragon Remix	Adi Shankar	France, United States	
Bullseye	Marvel Comics	Marv Wolfman and John Romita Sr.	United States	
Peter Burrell aka "Doctor Smith"	Mercury Rising	Lawrence Konner, Mark Rosenthal	United States	
Bushman	Marvel Comics	Doug Moench, Bill Sienkiewicz	United States	
Ront Byrnloo	Star Wars	George Lucas	United States	
Cain	The Cape	NBC	United States	
Toro Calican	Star Wars	Jon Favreau	United States	
Areola Canasta	If Looks Could Kill	Fred Dekker, Darren Star	United States	
Stuart Canmore aka Renaissance Hunter	Gargoyles	Disney Television Animation	United States	
Captain Cold	DC Comics	John Broome, Carmine Infantino	United States	
Champ	Goku Midnight Eye	Buichi Terasawa	Japan	
Chance	Marvel Comics	David Michelinie and Mike Harris	United States	
Chapel	Youngblood	Rob Liefeld	United States	
Charlie and Wesley	Nurse Betty	John C. Richards and James Flamberg	United States	
Mr. Chase	Marvel Comics	Sean McKeever, David Ross	United States	
Chastity Marks	Chaos! Comics	Brian Pulido and Steven Hughes	United States	
Cheshire	DC Comics	Marv Wolfman, George Pérez	United States	
Chidi	John Wick	Derek Kolstad	United States	
Anton Chigurh	No Country for Old Men	Cormac McCarthy	United States	
Chiun	The Destroyer	Warren Murphy, Richard Sapir	United States	
Choko Tateoka, the "Troubadour of Darkness"	Crying Freeman	Kazuo Koike, Ryoichi Ikegami	Japan	
Cinnamon	DC Comics	Roger McKenzie, Jack Abel, Danny Bulanadi	United States	
Sandor Clegane aka "The Hound"	A Song of Ice and Fire	George R. R. Martin	United States	
Coffin, aka The Ziggurat	Comics' Greatest World / Dark Horse Comics	Steven Grant, Team CGW	United States	
Combustion Man	Avatar: The Last Airbender	Michael Dante DiMartino and Bryan Konietzko	United States	
Sarah Connor	Terminator 2: Judgment Day	James Cameron, Gale Anne Hurd	United States	
The Consultant	The International	Eric Warren Singer	United States	
Contract hitmen	Outland	Peter Hyams	United States	
Cooke	Commando	Jeph Loeb, Matthew Weisman, Steven E. de Souza	United States	
Mark Cordell	The Juror	Ted Tally	United States	
Michael Corleone	The Godfather	Mario Puzo	United States	
Mia Corvere	Nevernight Chronicle	Jay Kristoff	Australia	
Brisco County, Jr.	The Adventures of Brisco County, Jr.	Jeffrey Boam and Carlton Cuse	United States	
Roland Cox	Jumper	Various	United States	
Crystal Bowie	Cobra Space Adventure	Buichi Terasawa	United States	
Curaré	Batman Beyond	Warner Bros. Family Entertainment	United States	
Joey Cusack	A History of Violence	Josh Olson	United States	
Ezio Auditore da Firenze	Assassin's Creed	Ubisoft	France	
Daken	Marvel Comics	Daniel Way and Steve Dillon	United States	
Dale and Ellen	The Night Agent	Seiichi Ishii	United States	
Dante	Devil May Cry	Hideki Kamiya	Japan	
Naoto Date	Tiger Mask	Ikki Kajiwara, Naoki Tsuji	Japan	
Daud, aka The Knife of Dunwall	Dishonored	Arkane Studios, Bethesda Softworks	United States	
David Cain	DC Comics	Kelley Puckett and Damion Scott	United States	
Shelly De Killer	Ace Attorney	Capcom	Japan	
Milady de Winter	The Three Musketeers	Alexandre Dumas	France	
Deadpool	Marvel Comics	Fabian Nicieza and Rob Liefeld	United States	
Deadshot	DC Comics	David Vern Reed, Lew Sayre Schwartz, Bob Kane	United States	
Death's Head	Transformers / Doctor Who / Marvel Comics	Simon Furman and Geoff Senior	United States; United Kingdom	
Deathfist	Judge Dredd	John Wagner, Alan Grant, Barry Kitson	United States	
Deathshadows	Stark Raven	Endless Horizons Entertainment	United States	
Deathstroke	DC Comics	Marv Wolfman, George Pérez	United States	
Debnoli	Star Wars	George Lucas	United States	
Rick Deckard	Do Androids Dream of Electric Sheep?	Philip K. Dick	United States	
Per Degaton	Legends of Tomorrow	Various	United States	
Rainn Delacourt	Jurassic World Dominion	Colin Trevorrow, Emily Carmichael, Derek Connolly	United States	
Florence Delaunay	Sharpe's Assassin	Bernard Cornwell	United Kingdom	
Delia, aka "Blue Eyes"	Sin City	Frank Miller	United States	
Mona Demarkov	Romeo Is Bleeding	Hilary Henkin	United States	
Dengar	Star Wars	George Lucas	United States	
Jack Devlin	The Net	John Brancato and Michael Ferris	United States	
Merle Dixon	The Walking Dead	Robert Kirkman	United States	
Din Djarin	Star Wars	Jon Favreau	United States	
Dirty Ezio	Robin Hood: Men in Tights	Mel Brooks	United States	
Dog	Marvel Comics, Ultraverse	Warren Ellis	United States	
Domino	Marvel Comics	Fabian Nicieza, Rob Liefeld	United States	
Walter C. Dornez	Hellsing	Kouta Hirano	United States	
Rico Dredd	Judge Dredd	John Wagner	United States	
Drei	Phantom of Inferno	Nitroplus	Japan	
Spider-Woman (Jessica Drew)	Marvel Comics	Archie Goodwin, Marie Severin	United States	
Elle Driver, aka "California Mountain Snake"	Kill Bill	Quentin Tarantino	United States	
Oscar Dzundza, aka The Golem	Sherlock	Mark Gatiss and Steven Moffat	United Kingdom	
Jubal Early	Firefly	Joss Whedon	United States	
Mai Lee East	Wild Wild West	Various	United States	
Ein	Phantom of Inferno	Nitroplus	Japan	
El Cameleón	Machete Kills	Robert Rodriguez, Marcel Rodriguez, Kyle Ward	United States	
El Cirujano	Sniper (1993)	Robert Rodriguez, Marcel Rodriguez, Kyle Ward	United States	
El Mariachi	El Mariachi	Robert Rodriguez	Mexico	
Elektra	Marvel Comics	Frank Miller	United States	
Artemis Entreri	Forgotten Realms	R.A. Salvatore	United States	
Jackie Estacado	The Darkness	Top Cow	United States	
Soul Evans	Soul Eater	Atsushi Ohkubo	Japan	
Captain Falcon	F-Zero	Shigeru Miyamoto	Japan	
Sofia Falcone	DC Comics	Jeph Loeb	United States	
Mickey Fallon	Killing Them Softly	Andrew Dominik	United States	
FitzChivalry Farseer	Farseer Trilogy	Robin Hobb	United States	
Ilsa Faust	Mission: Impossible film series	Christopher McQuarrie	United States	
Margot Fenring	Dune	Frank Herbert	United States	
Boba Fett	Star Wars	George Lucas	United States	
Jango Fett	Star Wars	George Lucas	United States	
Firefly	G.I. Joe	Larry Hama, various	United States	
Sam Fisher	Splinter Cell franchise	Tom Clancy	United States	
Mr. Fixx	Batman Beyond	Various	United States	
Phoebe Frady aka The Shadow	Heroes Reborn	Various	United States	
Django Freeman	Django Unchained	Quentin Tarantino	United States	
Mr. Freeze	Smallville	Various	United States	
Mahiro Fukagawa	Baby Assassins	Yugo Sakamoto	Japan	
Kaede Fuyumura	Baby Assassins: Nice Days	Yugo Sakamoto	Japan	
Galilean	Chaos! Comics	Brian Pulido	United States	
Gamora	Marvel Comics	Jim Starlin	United States	
Gandrayda	Metroid Prime 3: Corruption	Andrew Jones	United States	
Richard "Cherry" Ganz	Another 48 Hrs.	John Fasano, Jeb Stuart, Larry Gross	United States	
Gazelle	Kingsman: The Secret Service	Matthew Vaughn and Jane Goldman	United States	
Ghazan	The Legend of Korra	Tim Hedrick	United States	
The gholam	Wheel of Time	Robert Jordan	United States	
Ghor	Metroid Prime 3: Corruption	Andrew Jones	United States	
Ghost Dog	Ghost Dog: The Way of the Samurai	Jim Jarmusch	United States	
Ra's al Ghul	DC Comics	Dennis O'Neil, Neal Adams, Julius Schwartz	United States	
Nyssa Raatko	DC Comics	Greg RuckaKlaus Janson	United States	
Wesley Gibson	Top Cow (Millarworld)	Mark Millar, J. G. Jones	United States	
Armon Gill	Judge Dredd	John Wagner, Will Simpson	United States	
Gillecomgain, aka Hunter	Gargoyles	Walt Disney Television Animation	United States	
Richard Gladwell	Gotham	Warner Bros. Television	United States	
Sidney Glass	Once Upon a Time	Edward Kitsis, Adam Horowitz	United States	
Jonas Glim	DC Comics	Alan Grant, Val Semeiks	United States	
Goggles and Hicks	The Cape	NBC	United States	
Mr. Goodkat/Smith	Lucky Number Slevin aka The Wrong Man	Jason Smilovic	United States	
Superintendent Grail	Enola Holmes 2	Jack Thorne, Harry Bradbeer	United Kingdom	
Donovan "Red" Grant	James Bond	Ian Fleming	United Kingdom	
Michael Grant	The Last Hit	Reginald Hill, Walter Klenhard, Alan Sharp	United Kingdom	
Greedo	Star Wars	George Lucas	United States	
Vernita Green, aka "Copperhead"	Kill Bill	Quentin Tarantino	United States	
Grey Men	Wheel of Time	Robert Jordan	United States	
Grimalkin	Spook's	Joseph Delaney	United States	
Grocer	Grosse Pointe Blank	Tom Jankiewicz, D. V. DeVincentis, Steve Pink and John Cusack	United States	
Ilsa Grunt	If Looks Could Kill	Fred Dekker, Darren Star	United States	
Sir William Gull	From Hell	Alan Moore, Eddie Campbell	United States	
Gunhawk, aka Gunnery Sgt. Liam Hawkleigh	DC Comics	Chuck Dixon, Graham Nolan, Scott Hanna	United States	
The Gunslinger	Astro City	Kurt Busiek	United States	
Gwenpool	Marvel Comics	Christopher Hastings, Heather Antos, Jordan D. White, Chris Bachalo	United States	
Red Harlow	Red Dead	Rockstar San Diego	United States	
Han Cho Bai	Red 2	Jon Hoeber and Erich Hoeber	United States	
The Harpists	Kung Fu Hustle	Stephen Chow	China	
Harry Heck	The Punisher	Michael France and Jonathan Hensleigh	United States	
Maki Harukawa	Danganronpa V3: Killing Harmony	Spike Chunsoft	Japan	
The Hassassin, aka "Mr. Grey"	Angels & Demons	Dan Brown	United States	
The Hassansins	Prince of Persia: The Sands of Time	Jordan Mechner	United States	
Judy Havelock	James Bond, For Your Eyes Only	Ian Fleming	United Kingdom	
Melina Havelock	James Bond, For Your Eyes Only	Richard Maibaum, Michael G. Wilson	United Kingdom	
Ryu Hayabusa	Ninja Gaiden	Tecmo	Japan	
Maggie Hayward/"Nina"/"Claudia Anne Doran"	Point of No Return aka The Assassin	Robert Getchell, Alexandra Seros	United States	
Henriques	Commando	Joseph Loeb III, Matthew Weisman, Steven E. de Souza	United States	
Karl Hertz	Shoot 'Em Up	Michael Davis	United States	
Jonah Hex	DC Comics	John Albano and Tony DeZuniga	United States	
Yō Hinomura, the "Crying Freeman"	Crying Freeman	Kazuo Koike, Ryoichi Ikegami	Japan	
Hit	Dragon Ball	Akira Toriyama	Japan	
Hit-Girl	Icon/Image Comics (Millarworld)	Mark Millar, Dave Gibbons	United States	
Hitman (Tommy Monaghan)	DC Comics	Garth Ennis and John McCrea	United States	
Hitman	Marvel Comics	Archie Goodwin and Sal Buscema	United States	
Hit-Monkey	Marvel Comics	Daniel Way, Dalibor Talajić	United States	
Hitpig	Hitpig!	Berkeley Breathed	United States	
HK-47	Star Wars	David Gaider	United States	
Ed Hopper	Mr. Right	Max Landis	United States	
The Hornet	Bullet Train	Columbia Pictures	United States	
Mike Howell	American Ultra	Max Landis	United States	
Mr. Hudson	Wild Wild West	Various	United States	
Huntress	DC Extended Universe	Christina Hodson	United States	
Hvitserk	The Broken Empire	Mark Lawrence	United States	
Altaïr Ibn-La'Ahad	Assassin's Creed	Ubisoft	France	
IG-11	Star Wars	Jon Favreau	United States	
IG-88	Star Wars	George Lucas	United States	
Mr. Igoe	Innerspace	Jeffrey Boam, Chip Proser	United States	
Iria	Zeiram	Keita Amemiya	Japan	
Ysanne Isard, aka Iceheart	Star Wars	George Lucas	United States	
Sidon Ithano	Star Wars	J. J. Abrams	United States	
The Jackal	The Day of the Jackal	Frederick Forsyth	United Kingdom	
Whitey Jackson	Foul Play	Colin Higgins	United States	
Jaws	James Bond	Ian Fleming	United Kingdom	
Jazinda	Marvel Comics	Peter David	United States	
Dannik Jerriko	Star Wars	George Lucas	United States	
Jim Ti-Sam / Thunder Leg	Drunken Master	Siao Lung and Ng See-yuen	Hong Kong	
Jinx	G.I. Joe	Larry Hama	United States	
Jitterjack	Astro City	Kurt Busiek	United States	
Ah Jong	The Killer	John Woo	Hong Kong	
Mr. Joshua/Sub-Commander Jack Joshua	Lethal Weapon	Shane Black	United States	
J'Quille	Star Wars	George Lucas	United States	
The Judgement Knights	Comics' Greatest World / Dark Horse Comics	Steven Grant, Team CGW	United States	
Kai	Lexx	Lex Gigeroff	Canada	
Kain	Legacy of Kain	Silicon Knights	United States	
Kaine Parker	Marvel Comics	Terry Kavanagh and Steven Butler	United States	
Kanako, aka the Spider Woman	Wicked City	Hideyuki Kikuchi	Japan	
Kanden	Metroid Prime Hunters	Andrew Jones, Richard Vorodi, and Michael Harrington	United States	
Kanto	DC Comics	Jack Kirby	United States	
Jodo Kast	Star Wars	Various	United States	
Paul Kellerman	Prison Break	Paul Scheuring	United States	
Sarah Kerrigan	Starcraft	Chris Metzen, James Phinney	United States	
Kesskass	Trigun	Yasuhiro Nightow	Japan	
Kevin	Sin City	Frank Miller	United States	
Khamel	The Pelican Brief	John Grisham	United States	
Killer Cleaner	Johnny English Reborn	William Davies and Hamish McColl	United States	
Solf J. Kimblee	Fullmetal Alchemist	Hiromu Arakawa	Japan	
Yuichi Kimura	Bullet Train	Kōtarō Isaka	Japan	
Richard "Richie" Kirsch	Scream	Various	United States	
Kitche	Crying Freeman	Kazuo Koike, Ryoichi Ikegami	Japan	
The Knave of Hearts	Alice in Wonderland	Tim Burton	United States	
Kommando aka John Smith	BloodRayne	Terminal Reality	United States	
Michael Korda	Metro	Randy Feldman	United States	
Mr. Kornfeldt	Killers	Bob DeRosa	United States	
Kraab	Ben 10	Man of Action	United States	
Jack Krauser	Resident Evil 4	Capcom	Japan	
Darth Krayt	Star Wars	Various	United States	
Officer Krieger	Blade	David S. Goyer	United States	
Thane Krios	Mass Effect	BioWare	Canada	
Karl Ruprecht Kroenen	Hellboy	Mike Mignola	United States	
Kujaku, aka the Peacock Lady	Goku Midnight Eye	Buichi Terasawa	Japan	
Lady Deathstrike	Marvel Comics	Dennis O'Neil, William Johnson, Bill Mantlo, Sal Buscema	United States	
Lady Shiva	DC Comics	Dennis O'Neil, Ric Estrada	United States	
Lady Une	Mobile Suit Gundam Wing	Sunrise	Japan	
Solomon Lane	Mission: Impossible film series	Christopher McQuarrie	United States	
Colonel Philippe Lanier	Sharpe's Assassin	Bernard Cornwell	United Kingdom	
Felix LaPoubelle	Grosse Pointe Blank	Tom Jankiewicz, D. V. DeVincentis, Steve Pink and John Cusack	United States	
Mike Lawton	Blame It on the Bellboy	Mark Herman	United States	
Mitch Leary aka "Booth"	In the Line of Fire	Jeff Maguire	United States	
John Lee	The Replacement Killers	Ken Sanzel	United States	
Lemon and Tangerine	Bullet Train	Kōtarō Isaka	Japan	
Leon and "That Hillbilly Kid"	Todd McFarlane's Spawn	Todd McFarlane	United States	
Leper Queen	Marvel Comics	Peter Milligan, Salvador Larroca	United States	
Colonel Philippe Leroux	Sharpe's Sword	Bernard Cornwell	United Kingdom	
Lilly	Todd McFarlane's Spawn	Todd McFarlane	United States	
Morten Lindström	Kingsman: The Secret Service	Jane Goldman, Matthew Vaughn	United States	
Miss Lippenrieder	Wild Wild West	Various	United States	
Lobo	DC Comics	Roger Slifer, Keith Giffen	United States	
Lockdown	Transformers	Derrick J. Wyatt	United States	
Jonny Logan	Edizioni Dardo	Romano Garofalo, Leone Cimpellin	Italy	
Prince Lotor	Voltron: Legendary Defender	DreamWorks Animation Television, World Events Productions	United States	
Spicer Lovejoy	Titanic	James Cameron	United States	
Nestor Lozano	Designated Survivor	David Guggenheim	United States	
Vincent Ludwig	The Naked Gun: From the Files of Police Squad!	Jerry Zucker, Jim Abrahams, David Zucker, Pat Proft	United States	
Lunacy	Stark Raven	Endless Horizons Entertainment	United States	
Lunatik	Marvel Comics	Keith Giffen	United States	
Macheath, aka Mack the Knife	Mack the Knife	Kurt Weill, Bertolt Brecht	Germany	
Noah 'Il Duce' MacManus	The Boondock Saints	Troy Duffy	United States	
Mad March	Alice	Nick Willing	Canada, United States	
Mad Pierrot	Cowboy Bebop	Keiko Nobumoto, Toshihiro Kawamoto	Japan	
Madame B.	Avengers: Age of Ultron	Joss Whedon	United States	
Madame Masque	Marvel Comics	Stan Lee, Gene Colan	United States	
Madcap	Marvel Comics	Mark Gruenwald, Paul Neary	United States	
Mario Maghari	On the Job, aka OTJ	Various	United States	
Mai	Cyborg 009	Shotaro Ishinomori	Japan	
Mailman assassin	Three Days of the Condor	Lorenzo Semple Jr., David Rayfiel	United States	
Malachi	Agents of S.H.I.E.L.D.	Various	United States	
Patrick Malone	Gotham	Bruno Heller	United States	
"The Man on the Bridge"	Le Samouraï	Jean-Pierre Melville, Georges Pellegrin	United States	
The Man with No Name	Dollars Trilogy	Sergio Leone	Italy	
Steven Mandragora	DC Animated Universe	Warner Bros. Television Animation	United States	
Manheim	The Bourne Identity	Tony Gilroy, William Blake Herron	United States	
Mano	DC Comics	Jim Shooter, Curt Swan	United States	
Marcus	John Wick	Derek Kolstad	United States	
Maria	Lupin III: The Hemingway Papers	Various	Japan	
Marie	Dune franchise	Frank Herbert	United States	
Marrok	Star Wars	George Lucas	United States	
Martian Madame	Mars Attacks!	Jonathan Gems, Tim Burton	United States	
Mathayus the Akkadian	The Scorpion King	Stephen Sommers, Jonathan Hales	United States	
Mathilde	The American	Rowan Joffé	United States	
Maugrim	The Chronicles of Narnia	C. S. Lewis	United States	
PJ Maybe	Judge Dredd	John Wagner	United Kingdom	
Mazikeen	Lucifer	DC Comics	United States	
Hank McCain	Machine Gun McCain	Mino Roli, Giuliano Montaldo, Israel Horovitz	Italy	
Willem "Wildboy Willie" McCone	Comics' Greatest World / Dark Horse Comics	Steven Grant, Team CGW	United States	
Steve McKenna	The Mechanic	Lewis John Carlino	United States	
Meat Rack aka Oleg Kupov	Ultraverse	Malibu Comics, Marvel Comics	United States	
Mega Man X	Mega Man X	Capcom	Japan	
Megatak	Marvel Comics	Doug Moench, Alan Kupperberg	United States	
"Megan Walsh" aka Agent 83	Barely Lethal	John D'Arco	United States	
Mei	House of Flying Daggers	Li Feng, Peter Wu, Wang Bin, Zhang Yimou	China, Hong Kong	
Men of Leng aka Merchants aka Men in Turbans	The Dream-Quest of Unknown Kadath	H. P. Lovecraft	United States	
Mercenary Tao, also known as Tao Pai Pai	Dragon Ball	Akira Toriyama	Japan	
Mr. Mercer	Pirates of the Caribbean (film series)	Ted Elliott, Terry Rossio	United States	
Merlyn	DC Comics	Mike Friedrich, Neal Adams, Dick Dillin	United States	
Malcolm Merlyn	Arrow	Various	United States	
Mero of Braavos aka The Titan's Bastard	A Song of Ice and Fire	George R. R. Martin	United States	
Merrick	Todd McFarlane's Spawn	Todd McFarlane	United States	
Metal Sonic	Sonic the Hedgehog	Various	Japan	
Metallo	DC Animated Universe	Various	United States	
Metallo	Supergirl	Various	United States	
Mey-Rin	Black Butler	Yana Toboso	Japan	
Krombopulos Michael	Rick and Morty	Justin Roiland and Dan Harmon	United States	
Miho	Sin City	Frank Miller	United States	
Mileena	Mortal Kombat	Midway Games	United States	
Mallorie "Mal" Miles-Cobb	Inception	Christopher Nolan	United States	
Richard Miller	Sniper	Michael Frost Beckner, Crash Leyland	United States	
Sean Miller	Patriot Games	Tom Clancy	United States	
Mindboggler	DC Comics	Joey Cavalieri, Rafael Kayanan	United States	
Ming-Hua	The Legend of Korra	Tim Hedrick	United States	
Mini-Me	Austin Powers: The Spy Who Shagged Me	Mike Myers	United States	
Miss Topsey & Miss Turvey	Nanny McPhee and the Big Bang	Emma Thompson	United Kingdom	
Mister X	Marvel Comics	Frank Tieri, Sean Chen	United States	
Mister X	Tiger Mask	Ikki Kajiwara, Naoki Tsuji	Japan	
Mizuki	Dead or Alive 2: Birds	Masa Nakamura	Japan	
Molten Man	The Spectacular Spider-Man	Various	United States	
Ephant Mon	Star Wars	George Lucas	United States	
The Monkey Man	Raiders of the Lost Ark	Lawrence Kasdan	United States	
Leone "Léon" Montana	Léon: The Professional	Luc Besson	France	
Montross	Star Wars	Various	United States	
Colonel Sebastian Moran	Sherlock Holmes	Arthur Conan Doyle	United Kingdom	
Sabine Moreau	Mission: Impossible film series	Josh Appelbaum and André Nemec	United States	
Colonel Douglas Mortimer	For a Few Dollars More	Sergio Leone	Italy	
The Mother	The Mother	Misha Green	United States	
Francis Munch	Mr. Right	Max Landis	United States	
Munitia	Wild Wild West	Various	United States	
Murasaki aka Purple	Dragon Ball	Akira Toriyama	Japan	
Murdoc	MacGyver	Lee David Zlotoff	United States	
Muse	Marvel Comics	Charles Soule, Ron Garney	United States	
Mustafa	Austin Powers	Mike Myers	United States	
The Myrmidons	John Wick	Derek Kolstad	United States	
Myron	The Hit	Peter Prince	United States	
Nadia	The Boys	Eric Kripke	United States	
Misako Nakajo	Branded to Kill	Hachiro Guryu	Japan	
Nanao, aka "Ladybug"	Bullet Train	Kōtarō Isaka	Japan	
Nasir	Robin of Sherwood	Richard Carpenter	United Kingdom	
Nazgûl	The Lord of the Rings	J. R. R. Tolkien	United Kingdom	
The Nazgûl Sisters	Middle-earth: Shadow of War	Monolith Studios	United States	
Nebula	Marvel Comics	Roger Stern, John Buscema	United States	
Necros	James Bond, The Living Daylights	Eon Productions	United Kingdom	
Needlenose	The Transformers	Hasbro	United States	
Neesh	Star Wars	George Lucas	United States	
Nekron	DC Comics	Mike W. Barr, Len Wein, Joe Staton	United States	
Nemesis T-Type	Resident Evil	Capcom	Japan	
Neopolitan aka Neo	RWBY	Monty Oum	United States	
Nero	One Piece	Eiichiro Oda	Japan	
Newtralizer, born K'Vathrak	Teenage Mutant Ninja Turtles	Various	United States	
Ngoc Minh Quan	The Foreigner	David Marconi	United States	
Night Fright, aka Night Sight aka the Phantom Assassin	Metal Gear 2: Solid Snake	Hideo Kojima	Japan	
Nightbird	The Transformers	Hasbro	United States	
Nightmare	Soulcalibur	Project Soul	Japan	
Nightmare Terminator	Terminator: The Sarah Connor Chronicles	Josh Friedman	United States	
Nightslayer	DC Comics	Doug Moench, Gene Colan	United States	
Nikita	La Femme Nikita	Luc Besson	France	
Nimue	Once Upon a Time	Edward Kitsis, Adam Horowitz	United States	
Ninjara	Teenage Mutant Ninja Turtles Adventures	Various	United States	
Nitro	Marvel Comics	Jim Starlin	United States	
Nixon, aka Unit Four	Hard Boiled (comics)	Frank Miller	United States	
Noah the Akkadian	The Scorpion King	Stephen Sommers, Jonathan Hales	United States	
Nora	Witchblade	Top Cow	United States	
Ian Nottingham	Witchblade	Top Cow	United States	
Noxus	Metroid Prime Hunters	Andrew Jones and Richard Vorodi	United States	
Nuke	Marvel Comics	Frank Miller, David Mazzucchelli	United States	
Ten Numb	Star Wars	George Lucas	United States	
Number 22	Baoh	Hirohiko Araki	Japan	
The Number One Killer	Branded to Kill	Hachiro Guryu	Japan	
Snake Plissken	Escape from New York	John Carpenter, Nick Castle	United States	
Paddy O'Brien	Austin Powers	Mike Myers	United States	
Seamus O'Grady	Charlie's Angels: Full Throttle	John August, Cormac Wibberley, Marianne Wibberley	United States	
O-Ren Ishii, aka "Cottonmouth"	Kill Bill	Quentin Tarantino	United States	
Oburi	Kite	Yasuomi Umetsu	Japan	
Ochi	Star Wars	George Lucas	United States	
Octopunch	Transformers	Hasbro	United States	
Satoshi Oji, aka "The Prince"	Bullet Train	Kōtarō Isaka	Japan	
Old Joe	Looper	Rian Johnson	United States	
Oliver Queen	Arrow	The CW	United States	
Omar	Marvel Cinematic Universe	Disney	United States	
Omega-1	The Flash	Danny Bilson and Paul De Meo	United States	
Xenia Onatopp	James Bond, GoldenEye	Eon Productions	United Kingdom	
One-Eyed Jack	The Long Kiss Goodnight	Shane Black	United States	
The One-Armed Man (Gus Evans) aka "Fred Johnson"	The Fugitive	Roy Huggins	United States	
The One-Armed Man (Fredrick Sykes)	The Fugitive	David Twohy, Jeb Stuart	United States	
Onomatopoeia	DC Comics	Kevin Smith, Phil Hester	United States	
The Operative	Serenity	Joss Whedon	United States	
Order of the Night Wind	Star Wars	George Lucas	United States	
Orion	Avengers Confidential: Black Widow & Punisher	Marvel Entertainment, Sony Pictures Entertainment Japan, Madhouse	United States, Japan	
Orions/Ur'eon/Kolari	Star Trek: The Original Series	Gene Roddenberry	United States	
Orlok the Assassin	Judge Dredd	2000 AD	United Kingdom	
Oswald Cobblepot	Gotham	Warner Bros. Television	United States	
Oswald Cobblepot	Batman: The Telltale Series	Telltale Games	United States	
Outer Heaven	Metal Gear	Hideo Kojima	Japan	
Overt-Kill	Spawn	Todd McFarlane	United States	
Owlman	JLA: Earth 2	DC Comics	United States	
P'Li	The Legend of Korra	Tim Hedrick	United States	
Mrs. Phyllis H. Paddock	The X-Files	Chris Carter	United States	
Palo	The American	Rowan Joffé	United States	
Panty and Stocking	Panty & Stocking with Garterbelt	TAGRO	Japan	
Parasite (Joshua Allen)	DC Comics	Aaron Kuder, Dan Brown	United States	
Tom Paxton	Prison Break: The Conspiracy	ZootFly	United States	
Pe Ell	The Druid of Shannara	Terry Brooks	United States	
Peacemaker	DC Comics	Joe Gill, Pat Boyette	United States	
The Penguins	Gotham	Bruno Heller	United States	
Ms. Perkins	John Wick	Derek Kolstad	United States	
The Phantasm	Batman: Mask of the Phantasm	Alan Burnett, Paul Dini, Bruce Timm	United States	
Phil	Cyborg 009	Shotaro Ishinomori	Japan	
Lumen Pierce	Dexter	James Manos Jr.	United States	
Pistolera	DC Comics	Chuck Dixon, Graham Nolan, Scott Hanna	United States	
Plastoid	Marvel Comics	Stan Lee, Gene Colan	United States	
Stephanie Plum	One for the Money	Janet Evanovich	United States	
Greg Portman	The Bodyguard	Lawrence Kasdan	United States	
The Predacons (Transformers)	The Transformers	Hasbro	United States	
Pretty Riki	Kill Bill	Quentin Tarantino	United States	
Jessica Priest	Spawn franchise	Todd McFarlane	United States	
The Professor	The Bourne Identity	Tony Gilroy, William Blake Herron	United States	
Prometheus	DC Comics	Grant Morrison, Arnie Jorgensen	United States	
Psy-Crow	Earthworm Jim	Doug TenNapel	United States	
Pucker Puss	Dick Tracy	Chester Gould	United States	
Djas Puhr	Star Wars	George Lucas	United States	
Puma	Marvel Comics	Tom DeFalco, Ron Frenz	United States	
Pumpkinhead	Pumpkinhead	Gary Gerani, Mark Patrick Carducci	United States	
Punisher	Marvel Comics	Gerry Conway, John Romita Sr., Ross Andru	United States	
Python	Metal Gear	Hideo Kojima	Japan	
Python, Wolf and Crow	Vengeance	Wai Ka-Fai	Hong Kong, France	
Quackerjack	Darkwing Duck	Disney	United States	
Quan Chi	Mortal Kombat	Midway Games	United States	
Queen Safiyah Sohail	Batwoman	The CW	United States	
Quentin Glass	The Punisher	Jonathan Hensleigh, Michael France	United States	
Ray Quick	The Specialist	Alexandra Seros	United States	
Quiet	Metal Gear	Frank Herbert	Japan	
Quill	Justice (Marvel's New Universe)	Archie Goodwin	United States	
Rafferty	Ultraverse	Malibu Comics, Marvel Comics	United States	
Millia Rage	Guilty Gear	Daisuke Ishiwatari	Japan	
Rain	Mortal Kombat	Midway Games	United States	
John Rainbird	Firestarter	Stephen King	United States	
Reno Raines	Renegade	Stephen J. Cannell	United States	
Raizo	Ninja Assassin	Matthew Sand, J. Michael Straczynski	United States	
Josh Randall	Wanted Dead or Alive	CBS Productions	United States	
Raston Warrior Robot	Doctor Who	Various	United Kingdom	
Robert Rath	Assassins	The Wachowskis and Brian Helgeland	United States	
Lord Nelson Rathbone	Shanghai Knights	Alfred Gough, Miles Millar	United States	
Rattlesnake Jake	Rango	John Logan	United States	
Ravager	DC Comics	Various	United States	
Philip Raven	This Gun for Hire	Albert Maltz, W.R. Burnett	United States	
Ravenous	Marvel Comics	Keith Giffen, Renato Arlem	United States	
Ray and Ken	In Bruges	Martin McDonagh	United States	
Ray Shoesmith	Mr Inbetween	Scott Ryan	Australia	
Rayne	BloodRayne	Terminal Reality	United States	
Razor Fist	Marvel Comics	Doug Moench, Paul Gulacy	United States	
Razorclaw	The Transformers	Hasbro	United States	
Reace	Silver Streak	Colin Higgins	United States	
Reaper	Overwatch	Blizzard Entertainment	United States	
Red, aka Rubrum	Arrow	Various	United States	
Durham Red	2000 AD	John Wagner, Alan Grant, Carlos Ezquerra	United Kingdom	
Red Dart	DC Comics	Various	United States	
Red Daughter ("Krasnaya Doch") aka Snowbird	Supergirl	Various	United States	
Red Death Mask	Tiger Mask	Ikki Kajiwara, Naoki Tsuji	Japan	
Red Hood	DC Comics	Various	United States	
Red Skull	Marvel Comics	France Herron, Jack Kirby, Joe Simon	United States	
Red Tornado	Supergirl	Various	United States	
Red Widow	Marvel Comics	Jason Aaron, David Marquez	United States	
Red X	DC Comics	Various	United States	
Redhand	The Green Hornet	Phil Hester, Jonathan Ang Lau	United States	
Robert Montague Renfield	Renfield	Robert Kirkman, Ryan Ridley	United States	
Reptile	Mortal Kombat	Midway Games	United States	
Cataleya Restrepo	Colombiana	Luc Besson	United States	
Emilio Restrepo	Colombiana	Luc Besson	United States	
Reuban	Real Time	Randall Cole	Canada	
Ricochet	Marvel Comics	Various	United States	
Riddler	DC Animated Movie Universe	Various	United States	
Riddler	The Batman	Matt Reeves, Peter Craig	United States	
The Riddler's Cult	The Batman	Matt Reeves, Peter Craig	United States	
Ridley	Metroid	Makoto Kano	Japan	
Rience	The Witcher	Andrzej Sapkowski	Poland	
The Rifle	Batwoman (TV series)	Various	United States	
The Right Arm aka The Mountain People	The Scorch Trials	James Dashner	United States	
Ringer	Marvel Comics	David Kraft, Keith Giffen	United States	
Ringo Roadagain	JoJo's Bizarre Adventure	Hirohiko Araki	Japan	
Riot	Marvel Comics	David Michelinie, Ron Lim	United States	
Jackson Rippner	RedEye	Carl Ellsworth, Dan Foos	United States	
Riptide	Marvel Comics	Chris Claremont, John Romita Jr., Bret Blevins	United States	
Matthew Risman	Marvel Comics	Craig Kyle, Christopher Yost, Mark Brooks	United States	
Geralt of Rivia	The Witcher	Andrzej Sapkowski	Poland	
Roku/Angelina Alcott	Marvel Comics	Valiant Comics	United States	
Rolo	Code Geass	Gorō Taniguchi, Ichirō Ōkouchi	Japan	
Ronan the Accuser	Marvel Comics	Stan Lee, Jack Kirby	United States	
Ruckus (Transformers)	The Transformers	Hasbro	United States	
Rumor	The Batman	Various	United States	
Rundas	Metroid Prime 3: Corruption	Andrew Jones	United States	
Dante Ramon / Rupture / Reaper	The Flash	Various	United States	
The Russian	Marvel Comics	Garth Ennis, Steve Dillon	United States	
John "The Hangman" Ruth	The Hateful Eight	Quentin Tarantino	United States	
Ryker and Collins	The Replacement Killers	Ken Sanzel	United States	
Jon Sable	First Comics	Mike Grell	United States	
Sabretooth	Marvel Comics	Chris Claremont, John Byrne	United States	
Sagin the Wolf	The Tick	Ben Edlund	United States	
Sai Cotta	Stark Raven	Endless Horizons Entertainment	United States	
Saico-Tek	Teen Titans: Trouble in Tokyo	David Slack	United States	
The Saint of Killers, aka William Munny	Preacher	Garth Ennis, Steve Dillon	United States	
The Salesman	Sin City	Frank Miller	United States	
Sand Snakes	A Song of Ice and Fire	George R. R. Martin	United States	
The Sand Vipers	London Night Studios	Everette Hartsoe, Tom Sniegoski	United States	
Sang	Rush Hour	Ross LaManna	United States	
Santana, Diaz, Vargas, Falco, Nuñez and Luna	Riddick	David Twohy	United States	
Sarak	Robin of Sherwood	Richard Carpenter	United Kingdom	
Sardaukar	Dune franchise	Frank Herbert	United States	
Celaena Sardothien	Throne of Glass	Sarah J. Maas	United States	
Sawa	Kite	Yasuomi Umetsu	Japan	
Shuuichi Sawada	Dead or Alive 2: Birds	Masa Nakamura	Japan	
Mona Sax	Max Payne	Sam Lake	United States	
Scalphunter	Marvel Comics	Chris Claremont, John Romita Jr.	United States	
Scarab	DC Comics	Various	United States	
Francisco Scaramanga aka The Man with the Golden Gun	James Bond	Ian Fleming	United Kingdom	
Scarecrow	Cyborg 009	Shotaro Ishinomori	Japan	
Dr. King Schultz	Django Unchained	Quentin Tarantino	United States	
Schneider	Schneider vs Bax	Alex van Warmerdam	Netherlands, Belgium	
Scimitar	Arrow	Various	United States	
Scorpiana	DC Comics	Various	United States	
Scorch	Star Wars	George Lucas	United States	
Scorpion	Mortal Kombat	Midway	United States	
Scorpion	Ultimate Spider-Man (TV series)	Marvel Animation	United States	
Scorpion	Spider-Man: Into the Spider-Verse	Marvel Entertainment	United States	
Scorpion the Grim Ripper	Stark Raven	Endless Horizons Entertainment	United States	
Scourge of the Underworld	Marvel Comics	Mark Gruenwald, John Byrne	United States	
Scrambler	Marvel Comics	Chris Claremont, Marc Silvestri	United States	
Scytale	Dune franchise	Frank Herbert	United States	
SEAL Team Ricks	Rick and Morty	Justin Roiland and Dan Harmon	United States	
Colt Seavers	The Fall Guy	Glen A. Larson	United States	
The Secret Six	DC Comics	Various	United States	
Sektor	Mortal Kombat	Midway Games	United States	
The Selkie	Tom Clancy's Net Force	Tom Clancy	United States	
Sensei	DC Comics	Neal Adams	United States	
Senyaka	Marvel Comics	Scott Lobdell, John Romita Jr.	United States	
Sephiroth	Final Fantasy VII	Tetsuya Nomura, Kazushige Nojima	Japan	
Sera	Star Trek: New Worlds	David Reed	United States	
Sergei	Interview with a Hitman	Perry Bhandal	United Kingdom	
Mr. Shadow	Wicked City	Hideyuki Kikuchi	Japan	
Shadow Androids	Sonic Heroes	Sega, Sonic Team USA	Japan	
Shadow Assassins	Mortal Kombat	Midway Games	United States	
Shadow Company	Lethal Weapon	Shane Black	United States	
Shadow Knight	Marvel Comics	Doug Moench, Bill Sienkiewicz, Mike Zeck	United States	
The Shadow Seven	Marvel Comics	Valiant Comics	United States	
Shadow Viper (Miko Nguyen)	London Night Studios	Everette Hartsoe, Tom Sniegoski	United States	
Shadow the Hedgehog	Sonic Adventure 2	Takashi Iizuka, Shiro Maekawa	Japan	
Shahdee	Prince of Persia: Warrior Within	UbiSoft	France, United States	
Fennec Shand	Star Wars	Dave Filoni	United States	
Shang Tsung	Mortal Kombat	Midway Games	United States	
Shao Kahn	Mortal Kombat	Midway Games	United States	
Tetrax Shard	Ben 10	Man of Action	United States	
Shatterax	Marvel Comics	Len Kaminski, Paul Ryan	United States	
Sergeant Raymond Shaw	The Manchurian Candidate	Richard Condon	United States	
Shayes	Mercury Rising	Lawrence Konner, Mark Rosenthal	United States	
Sheath	Marvel Rising	Christopher Yost, Marcus To	United States	
Mr. Shhh	Things to Do in Denver When You're Dead	Scott Rosenberg	United States	
Shin	Fist of the North Star	Buronson, Tetsuo Hara	Japan	
Shikebaro	Crying Freeman	Kazuo Koike, Ryoichi Ikegami	Japan	
Shinobi Shaw	Marvel Comics	Jim Lee, Whilce Portacio, Chris Claremont	United States	
Sayoko Shinozaki	Code Geass	Gorō Taniguchi, Ichirō Ōkouchi	Japan	
Shocker	Marvel Comics	Stan Lee, John Romita Sr.	United States	
Shockwave	The Transformers	Hasbro	United States	
Shredder	Teenage Mutant Ninja Turtles	Mirage Studios	United States	
Shriek	DC Comics	Various	United States	
Shuriken, aka Kyoko Shidara	Victory Comics	Reggie Byers	United States	
Shush	DC Comics	Various	United States	
SIRKS, aka The Clowns	Skull Man (2007 anime)	Various	Japan	
Silas	The Da Vinci Code	Dan Brown	United States	
Silence	The Great Silence	Vittoriano Petrilli, Mario Amendola, Bruno Corbucci, Sergio Corbucci	Italy	
Silencer, aka Silentum	Arrow	Various	United States	
Silhouette	Deus Ex	Ion Storm	United States	
Silver Monkey	DC Comics	Various	United States	
Silver Sable	Marvel Comics	Tom DeFalco, Ron Frenz	United States	
Sin	Marvel Comics	J.M. DeMatteis, Ron Frenz	United States	
Aurra Sing	Star Wars	George Lucas	United States	
SixSix	Ben 10	Man of Action	United States	
Lionel Skinner aka Mr. Skinner	101 Dalmatians	John Hughes	United States	
Skizm	Stark Raven	Endless Horizons Entertainment	United States	
The Skull	Scarface	Oliver Stone	United States	
Skull Face	Metal Gear	Hideo Kojima	Japan	
Skull Mask	Cyborg 009	Shotaro Ishinomori	Japan	
"Skulls" Parasite Unit	Metal Gear	Hideo Kojima	Japan	
Cade Skywalker	Star Wars	Various	United States	
Mara Jade Skywalker	Star Wars	George Lucas	United States	
Slayer	Guilty Gear	Daisuke Ishiwatari	Japan	
Slaymaster	Marvel Comics	Jim Lawrence, Larry Lieber, Ron Wilson	United States	
Rum Sleg	Star Wars	George Lucas	United States	
Slipknot	DC Extended Universe	Various	United States	
Melvin Smiley, Cisco, Crunch, Vince and Gump	The Big Hit	Ben Ramsey	United States	
"Mr. Smith" and "Ms. Jones"	Nick of Time	Patrick Sheane Duncan	United States	
John and Jane Smith	Mr. & Mrs. Smith	Simon Kinberg	United States	
Smoke	Mortal Kombat	Midway Games	United States	
Snake	Black Butler	Yana Toboso	Japan	
Snake	Smallville	Various	United States	
Snakefinger	Milestone Comics	Various	United States	
Sniper	Machete	Robert Rodriguez, Álvaro Rodriguez	United States	
Sniper	Team Fortress 2	Valve	United States	
Sniper Wolf	Metal Gear	Hideo Kojima	United States	
Snowflake	Agents of S.H.I.E.L.D.	Various	United States	
Sovereign	XCOM: Chimera Squad	Firaxis Games	United States	
Speed-o'-Sound Sonic	One-Punch Man	One	Japan	
The Spies	Spy vs. Spy	Antonio Prohías	United States	
The Spirit Killer	Charmed	Various	United States	
The Spot	Marvel Comics	Al Milgrom, Herb Trimpe	United States	
Solid Snake	Metal Gear	Hideo Kojima	United States	
Sy Snoodles	Star Wars	George Lucas	United States	
The Sons of the Harpy	A Song of Ice and Fire	George R. R. Martin	United States	
Spike Spiegel	Cowboy Bebop	Hajime Yatate and Toshihiro Kawamoto	Japan	
Spire	Metroid Prime Hunters	Andrew Jones and Richard Vorodi	United States	
Sportsmaster	DC Comics	John Broome, Irwin Hasen	United States	
Spymaster	Marvel Comics	David Michelinie, Bob Layton	United States	
Star Clan	Soul Eater	Atsushi Ohkubo	Japan	
Starkiller	Star Wars	George Lucas	United States	
Starscream	Transformers: Prime	Various	United States	
Steve	Mr. Right	Max Landis	United States	
Steven	The Suicide Theory	Michael J. Kospiah	Australia	
Erik Stevens / Killmonger	Marvel Cinematic Universe	Ryan Coogler and Joe Robert Cole	United States	
Stigmata	Avatar Press	Brian Pulido	United States	
Rupert Stiltskin alias "The Dwarf"	Foul Play	Colin Higgins	United States	
Stingrayzor	Stark Raven	Endless Horizons Entertainment	United States	
Storm Shadow	G.I. Joe	Larry Hama	United States	
Street Preacher aka Karl Honig	Johnny Mnemonic	William Gibson	United States	
Strych-9	The Tenth	Tony Daniel	United States	
Strych-9's ninjas	The Tenth	Tony Daniel	United States	
Sub-Zero	Mortal Kombat	Midway Games	United States	
Chisato Sugimoto	Baby Assassins	Yugo Sakamoto	Japan	
Michael "Mike" Sullivan Sr	Road To Perdition	Max Allan Collins, Richard Piers Rayner	United States	
Sully	Commando	Joseph Loeb III, Matthew Weisman, Steven E. de Souza	United States	
The Swedes	The American	Rowan Joffé	United States	
Georgia Sykes	Smokin' Aces	Joe Carnahan	United States	
Sylux	Metroid Prime Hunters	Andrew Jones, Richard Vorodi, and Michael Harrington	United States	
Suì-Fēng	Bleach	Tite Kubo	Japan	
Szeth-son-son-Vallano, Truthless of Shinovar	The Way of Kings	Brandon Sanderson	United States	
T-00/"Mr. X"/"Trenchy"/Tyrant/Super Tyrant (mutated form)/T1/T-103	Resident Evil	Capcom	Japan	
T-078/Tyrant	Resident Evil - Code: Veronica	Capcom	Japan	
T-1000	Terminator 2: Judgment Day	James Cameron, William Wisher	United States	
T-1001	Terminator: The Sarah Connor Chronicles	Josh Friedman	United States	
T-3000	Terminator Genisys	Laeta Kalogridis, Patrick Lussier	United States	
T-5000 aka Skynet aka "Genisys" aka "Skychild"	Terminator Genisys	Laeta Kalogridis, Patrick Lussier	United States	
T-Ray	Marvel Comics	Joe Kelly, Ed McGuinness	United States	
T-X aka "Terminatrix"	Terminator 3: Rise of the Machines	John Brancato, Michael Ferris	United States	
Tabitha Galavan	Gotham	Bruno Heller	United States	
Takeshi and his team	Ninja Assassin	Matthew Sand, J. Michael Straczynski	United States	
Talia al Ghul	DC Comics	Dennis O'Neil, Bob Brown	United States	
Talon	DC Comics	Scott Snyder, Greg Capullo	United States	
Talon	Overwatch	Blizzard Entertainment	United States	
Tanaka's Daughter	The Punisher (1989 film)	Boaz Yakin	United States	
Karl Tanner	Game of Thrones	George R.R. Martin	United States	
Ken "Nick" Takase/Machineman	Nebula Mask Machineman	Shotaro Ishinomori and Toei	Japan	
Tanya	Crying Freeman	Kazuo Koike, Ryoichi Ikegami	Japan	
Tarah	Star Trek: Enterprise	Rick Berman, Brannon Braga	United States	
Tarantula (Taylor Crossart)	DC Comics	Bert Christman, Gardner Fox	United States	
Tarantula (Franklin Lester)	DC Comics	Cary Bates	United States	
Tarantula (Roger Goldman)	DC Comics	Matt Wagner, Guy Davis	United States	
Tarantula (Catalina Flores)	DC Comics	Devin Grayson	United States	
Tarantula (Anton Miguel Rodriguez)	Marvel Comics	Gerry Conway, Ross Andru	United States	
Tarantula (Luis Alvarez)	Marvel Comics	Gerry Conway, Alex Saviuk	United States	
Tarantula (Miguel Santiago)	Marvel Comics	Stan Lee, Larry Lieber	United States	
Random Task	Austin Powers	Mike Myers	United States	
Taskmaster	Marvel Comics	David Michelinie, George Pérez	United States	
Udai Taxim	Cowboy Bebop	Hajime Yatate	Japan	
The Terminator aka Cyberdyne Systems Model 101 Series 800 Terminator	The Terminator	James Cameron	United States	
The Thin Man	Charlie's Angels franchise	Ryan Rowe, Ed Solomon, John August	United States	
Allan Thompson	The Adventures of Tintin	Hergé	Belgium	
The Three Blind Mice	James Bond, Dr. No	Eon Productions	United Kingdom	
Three-Fingered Pete	The Black Adder	Richard Curtis, Rowan Atkinson	United Kingdom	
Thufir Hawat	Dune franchise	Frank Herbert	United States	
Tiffany	Spawn	Todd McFarlane, Tony Daniel	United States	
Tiger Claw aka Takeshi	Teenage Mutant Ninja Turtles	Ciro Nieli, Joshua Sternin, J. R. Ventimilia	United States	
Timothy	The Long Kiss Goodnight	Shane Black	United States	
Tira	Soulcalibur franchise	Project Soul	Japan	
Tleilaxu Face Dancers	Dune franchise	Frank Herbert	United States	
Duke Togo aka Golgo 13	Golgo 13	Takao Saito	Japan	
Major Arnold Ernst Toht	Raiders of the Lost Ark	Lawrence Kasdan	United States	
Tora No Shi	Witchblade	Top Cow	United States	
Trace	Metroid Prime Hunters	Andrew Jones, Richard Vorodi, and Michael Harrington	United States	
Richard Travers	Cliffhanger	Michael France, Sylvester Stallone	United States	
Roland Treece	Sony's Spider-Man Universe	Marvel Entertainment	United States	
Ned Trent	The Specialist	Alexandra Seros	United States	
Trio	Max Payne	Remedy Entertainment	United States	
Turles	Dragon Ball Z: The Tree of Might	Takao Koyama	Japan	
Turles Crusher Corps	Dragon Ball Z: The Tree of Might	Takao Koyama	Japan	
The Twins	The Matrix Reloaded	The Wachowskis	United States	
The Twins	Men in Black: International	Art Marcum, Matt Holloway	United States	
Twisted 3: Kirai, Jihi and Ryuko	The Tenth	Tony Daniel	United States	
Tyekanik	Children of Dune	Frank Herbert	United States	
Typhoid Mary	Marvel Comics	Ann Nocenti, John Romita Jr.	United States	
Valkyrie	Marvel Cinematic Universe	Taika Waititi	United States	
Asajj Ventress	Star Wars	George Lucas	United States	
Tommy Vercetti	Grand Theft Auto	Rockstar North	United Kingdom	
Vicious	Cowboy Bebop	Hajime Yatate	Japan	
Victor the Cleaner	Point of No Return aka The Assassin	Robert Getchell, Alexandra Seros	United States	
Viktor	Interview with a Hitman	Perry Bhandal	United Kingdom	
Villanelle	Killing Eve	Luke Jennings	United Kingdom	
Vincent	Collateral	Stuart Beattie	United States	
Vincent Vega and Jules Winnfield	Pulp Fiction	Quentin Tarantino	United States	
Viper (Madame Hydra)	Marvel Comics	Jim Steranko	United States	
Tor Vizsla	Star Wars	George Lucas	United States	
Vitus Dance	Judge Dredd	John Wagner, Alan Grant, Barry Kitson	United Kingdom	
Vodka	Case Closed franchise	Gosho Aoyama	Japan	
Pieter Vorstedt	Lethal Weapon 2	Jeffrey Boam, Shane Black, Warren Murphy	United States	
Melina Vostokoff	Black Widow	Eric Pearson, Jac Schaeffer, Ned Benson	United States	
The Waif	Game of Thrones	George R.R. Martin	United States	
Sarah Walker	Chuck	Josh Schwartz, Chris Fedak	United States	
Nathan Wallace aka "The Repo Man"	Repo: The Genetic Opera	Terrance Zdunich, Darren Smith	United States	
Jack Walsh	Midnight Run	George Gallo	United States	
Warlocks of Qarth	Game of Thrones	George R.R. Martin	United States	
Major Marquis Warren	The Hateful Eight	Quentin Tarantino	United States	
Harry Waters	In Bruges	Martin McDonagh	United States	
Sharice Watters	Smokin' Aces	Joe Carnahan	United States	
Weapon XI	X-Men Origins: Wolverine	David Benioff and Skip Woods	United States	
Weavel	Metroid Prime Hunters	Andrew Jones and Richard Vorodi	United States	
The Weeping Monk	Cursed	Frank Miller and Tom Wheeler	United States	
Otto West	A Fish Called Wanda	John Cleese, Charles Crichton	United States	
Mr. White	WildC.A.T.s, Stormwatch	Unknown	United States	
John Wick	John Wick franchise	Derek Kolstad	United States	
Widowmaker	Overwatch	Blizzard Entertainment	United States	
Anna Williams	Tekken	Seiichi Ishii	Japan	
Nina Williams	Tekken	Seiichi Ishii	Japan	
Remo Williams	The Destroyer	Warren Murphy, Richard Sapir	United States	
Victoria "Vicky" Winslow	Red	Jon Hoeber and Erich Hoeber	United States	
Mr. Wint and Mr. Kidd	James Bond	Ian Fleming	United Kingdom	
Barb Wire	Comics' Greatest World / Dark Horse Comics	Chris Warner, Team CGW	United States	
The Wolf	Bullet Train	Kōtarō Isaka	Japan	
Nicholas D. Wolfwood	Trigun	Yasuhiro Nightow	Japan	
Sabine Wren	Star Wars	Various	United States	
Wulfgar, born Heymar Reinhardt	Nighthawks	David Shaber and Paul Sylbert	United States	
X	Comics' Greatest World / Dark Horse Comics	Steven Grant, Team CGW	United States	
Yakuza Assassin	Johnny Mnemonic	William Gibson	United States	
Nie Yinniang	The Assassin	Hou Hsiao-hsien, Chu T'ien-wen, Hsieh Hai-Meng, Ah Cheng	Taiwan, China, Hong Kong	
'Yojimbo' the ronin	Machibuse	Kyu Fujiki, Hideo Oguni, Hajime Takaiwa, Ichiro Miyakawa	Japan	
Seth Youngblood	Marvel Comics	Unknown	United States	
Zaheer	The Legend of Korra	Michael Dante DiMartino	United States	
Zam Wesell	Star Wars	George Lucas	United States	
The Zahlenschwestern (Vier, Fünf, Sechs, Sieben, Acht and Neun)	Phantom of Inferno	Nitroplus	Japan	
Zando-Zan Assassins	The Last Starfighter	Jonathan R. Betuel	United States	
Zarek	Dark-Hunter	Sherrilyn Kenyon	United States	
Zeiss	DC Comics	Ed Brubaker, Scott McDaniel	United States	
Zento	Hitman's Wife's Bodyguard	Tom O'Connor	United States	
Zigesfeld	If Looks Could Kill	Fred Dekker, Darren Star	United States	
Zuckuss	Star Wars	George Lucas	United States	
Zwei	Phantom of Inferno	Nitroplus	Japan	
Ōtomo	RoboCop 3	Frank Miller and Fred Dekker	United States	
Nadie	El Cazador de la Bruja	Bee Train, Kōichi Mashimo	Japan	
Ricardo	El Cazador de la Bruja	Bee Train, Kōichi Mashimo	Japan	
