= Aaron Taylor-Johnson =

English actor (born 1990)

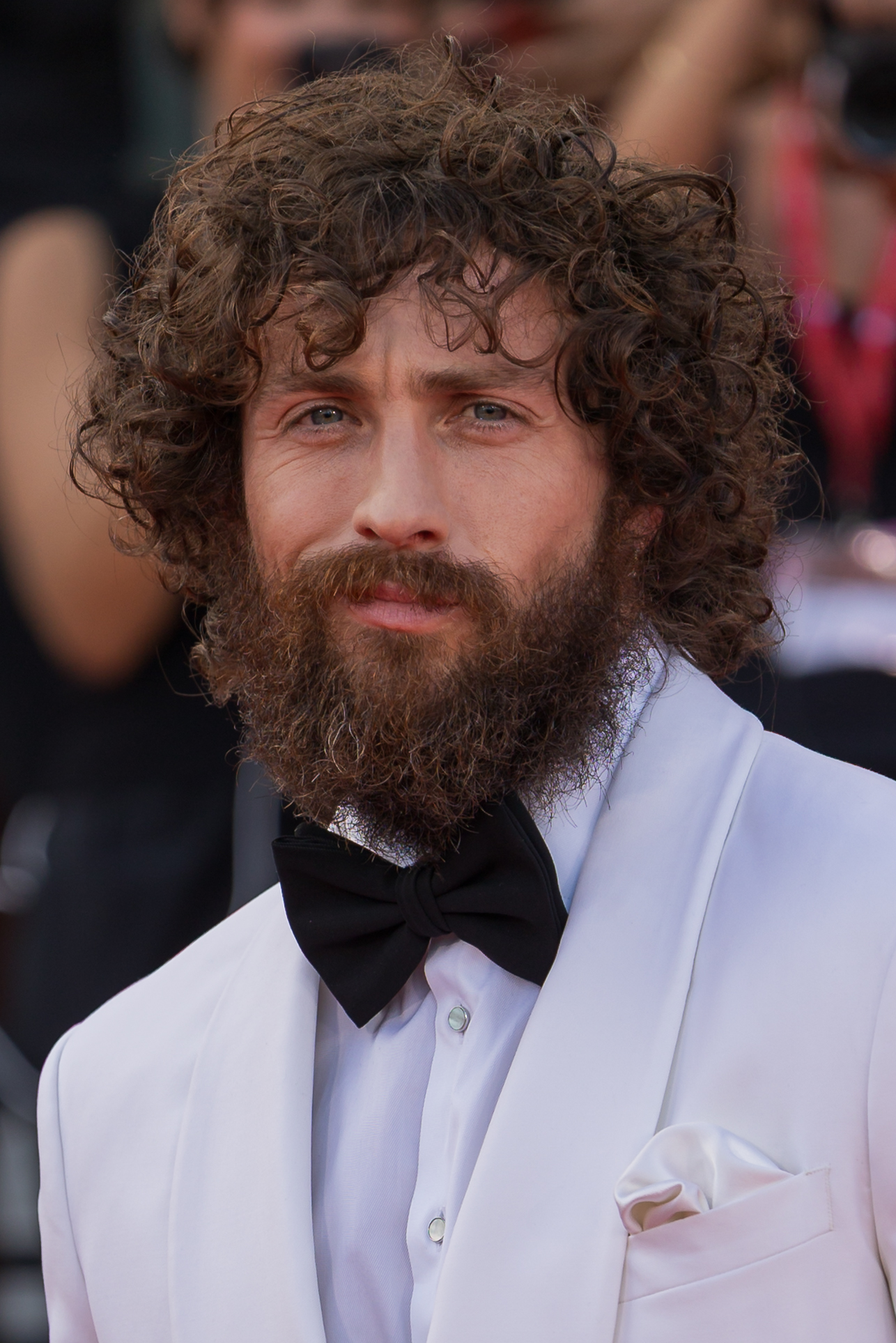
- Taylor-Johnson in 2025
- Born: Aaron Perry Johnson; 13 June 1990 (age 36); High Wycombe, Buckinghamshire, England
- Occupation: Actor
- Years active: 1996–present
- Spouse: Sam Taylor-Wood (m. 2012)
- Children: 2

Aaron Perry Taylor-Johnson (né Johnson; born 13 June 1990) is an English actor. His accolades include a Golden Globe Award and an Empire Award in addition to nominations for two British Academy Film Awards and a British Independent Film Award.

As a child actor, Taylor-Johnson performed in films including Shanghai Knights (2003), The Illusionist (2006), and Angus, Thongs and Perfect Snogging (2008). He had his breakthrough performance as John Lennon in the biopic Nowhere Boy (2009), directed by Sam Taylor-Wood whom he married in 2012, adding her surname. He gained recognition for his portrayal of the title character in Kick-Ass (2010) and its sequel Kick-Ass 2 (2013), as well as performances in the crime thriller Savages (2012), period drama Anna Karenina (2012), and monster film Godzilla (2014).

Taylor-Johnson next portrayed the Marvel Cinematic Universe character Pietro Maximoff in Avengers: Age of Ultron (2015). For playing a psychopathic drifter in the thriller film Nocturnal Animals (2016), he won the Golden Globe Award for Best Supporting Actor. He has since appeared in the action films Tenet (2020), Bullet Train (2022), and The Fall Guy (2024), as well as starring roles in the horror films Nosferatu (2024) and 28 Years Later (2025).

== Early life ==
Aaron Perry Johnson was born in High Wycombe on 13 June 1990. His father, Robert, was a civil engineer and his mother, Sarah, "stayed at home [and] worked odd jobs here and there so [they] could get by." He has a sister named Gemma, who later had a small role in his film Tom & Thomas (2002). Johnson is Jewish.

He went to Holmer Green Senior School and attended the Jackie Palmer Stage School in High Wycombe, studying drama, tap, jazz, acrobatics, and singing. He left school at 15.

== Career ==
=== Beginnings and rise to fame (1999–2015) ===
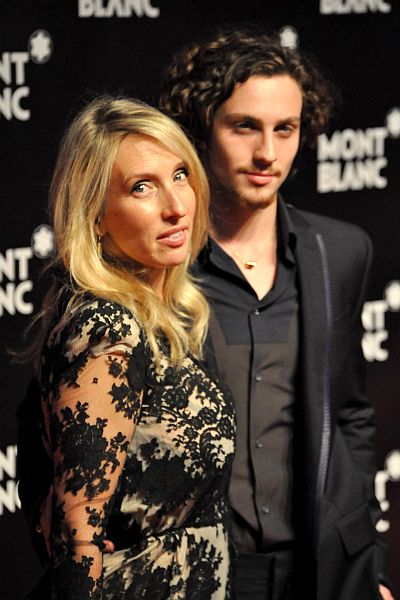
Taylor-Johnson with future wife Sam Taylor-Johnson in September 2010

Johnson began acting at the age of six. On stage, he appeared in a London production of William Shakespeare's Macbeth, playing the son of Macduff alongside Rufus Sewell, who played Macbeth, in 1999. He appeared in Arthur Miller's All My Sons in 2000. His television roles have included Niker in the 2004 BBC adaptation of the novel Feather Boy, Aaron in Danny Brocklehurst's ITV1 serial Talk to Me, and Owen Stephens in Nearly Famous. In 2003, Johnson appeared as a young Charlie Chaplin in Shanghai Knights alongside Jackie Chan and Owen Wilson, with Chaplin depicted as a member of a London gang of street hooligans. That year, he guest starred in "Fatal Consequences", a special live episode of the ITV drama The Bill. In 2006, he appeared in The Illusionist, appearing in the early flashback scenes as Edward Norton's character, Eduard Abramovicz, as a teenager. The scenes show the young Eduard as he first learns magic. To do this, Johnson had to learn how to perform the ball trick that his character performs. He learned how to balance the egg on the stick, although that was mechanically effected. Also in 2006, he starred in the film The Thief Lord as Prosper.

Johnson appeared as John Lennon in the 2009 biographical film Nowhere Boy, directed by Sam Taylor-Wood, whom he later married. His performance won him the Empire Award for Best Newcomer, and he was nominated for Young British Performer of the Year by the London Film Critics' Circle. In 2010, Johnson appeared as David "Dave" Lizewski/Kick-Ass, the lead character in Kick-Ass, based on the superhero comic book of the same name by Scottish writer Mark Millar. His performance in Kick-Ass saw him nominated for the BAFTA Rising Star Award. He has also appeared as the central character, William, in Hideo Nakata's Chatroom. In December 2010, Johnson joined the cast of Albert Nobbs as a replacement for Orlando Bloom. Johnson starred in R.E.M.'s 2011 music video "Überlin", which was directed by his then-fiancée.

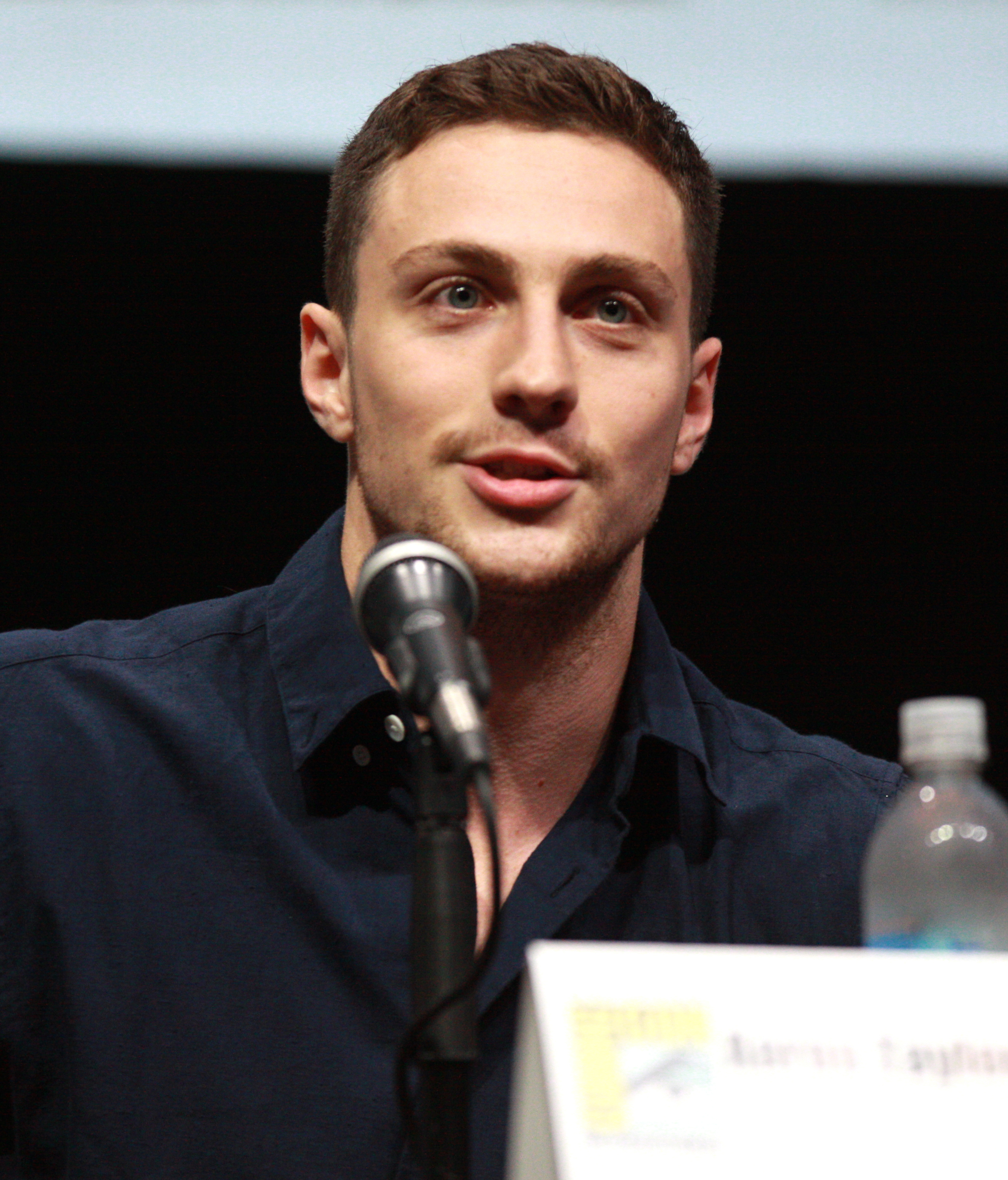
Taylor-Johnson at the 2013 San Diego Comic-Con

In 2012, Taylor-Johnson played Count Vronsky in Anna Karenina. Later that year, he starred as Ben in Oliver Stone's Savages. HitFix film critic Drew McWeeny was positive of the bond between Johnson and co-star Taylor Kitsch, which "seems not only credible but lived in and authentic throughout the film," and noted the evolution in maturity of Johnson since Kick-Ass. Taylor-Johnson starred in the Godzilla reboot, released in May 2014. Taylor-Johnson played Quicksilver in Avengers: Age of Ultron (2015), the sequel to 2012's The Avengers, as part of the Marvel Cinematic Universe. Taylor-Johnson first appeared as the character in a post-credits scene of the film Captain America: The Winter Soldier (2014). The role reunited him with Elizabeth Olsen, who played his wife in Godzilla.

=== Career progression (2016–present) ===
In 2016, he played Ray, a menacing Texan, in Tom Ford's thriller Nocturnal Animals. For the role, he won the Golden Globe Award for Best Supporting Actor – Motion Picture. Taylor-Johnson also became first Golden Globe Award for Best Supporting Actor winner since Richard Benjamin who did not receive an Academy Award nomination. For the role, he received a nomination for the BAFTA Award for Best Actor in a Supporting Role. In 2017, he played an American soldier in Doug Liman's thriller The Wall, and in 2018, he appeared in Outlaw King, a British-American historical action drama about Robert the Bruce and the Wars of Scottish Independence.

In 2020, Taylor-Johnson had a supporting role in Christopher Nolan's film Tenet. In 2022, he appeared in David Leitch's Bullet Train, an action-thriller film based on the novel Mariabītoru by Kōtarō Isaka. In 2023, he appeared in a commercial for Armani's Acqua di Giò fragrance, shot in Telašćica Nature Park. He reunited with Leitch in the 2024 action film The Fall Guy. Also in 2024, Taylor-Johnson played another Marvel character in Kraven the Hunter, as part of Sony's Spider-Man Universe. He featured in Robert Eggers' horror film Nosferatu.

Taylor-Johnson starred in 28 Years Later, a sequel to the 2002 film 28 Days Later, directed by Danny Boyle.

== Personal life ==
Johnson met filmmaker Sam Taylor-Wood in 2008 when he auditioned for her film Nowhere Boy. He was 18 and she was 41 at the time. They began dating soon after filming wrapped and became engaged in October 2009. Johnson stated he asked her to marry him a year after they met.

They married in the chapel at Babington House on 21 June 2012. They changed both their surnames to Taylor-Johnson. They have two daughters, born in 2010 and 2012, and Johnson is stepfather to Sam's two daughters from her previous marriage.

Taylor-Johnson was named one of GQ's 50 best dressed British men in 2015. In a 2019 interview with GQ Australia, he defined his style as "elegant" and "timeless".

Taylor-Johnson lives with his wife and their two daughters on a farm near Bruton, Somerset, and he spends his time vegetable farming.

== Filmography ==
=== Film ===
Key
†	Denotes films that have not yet been released

Year	Title	Role	Notes
2000	The Apocalypse	Johanan	
2002	Tom & Thomas	Tom Sheppard / Thomas	
2003	Behind Closed Doors	Sam Goodwin	
2003	Shanghai Knights	Charlie Chaplin	
2004	Dead Cool	George	
2006	The Thief Lord	Prosper	
2006	The Illusionist	Young Eisenheim	
2006	Fast Learners	Neil	Short film
2006	The Best Man	Michael (Aged 15)	
2007	The Magic Door	"Flip"	
2008	Dummy	Danny	
2008	Angus, Thongs and Perfect Snogging	Robbie Jennings	
2009	The Greatest	Bennett Brewer	
2009	Nowhere Boy	John Lennon	
2010	Kick-Ass	Dave Lizewski / Kick-Ass	
2010	Chatroom	William Collins	
2011	Albert Nobbs	Joe Mackins	
2012	Savages	Ben Leonard	
2012	Anna Karenina	Count Alexei Kirillovich Vronsky	Final credit as Aaron Johnson
2013	Kick-Ass 2	Dave Lizewski / Kick-Ass	First credit as Aaron Taylor-Johnson
2014	Captain America: The Winter Soldier	Pietro Maximoff	Uncredited cameo; mid-credits scene
2014	Godzilla	Lieutenant Ford Brody	
2015	Avengers: Age of Ultron	Pietro Maximoff	
2016	Nocturnal Animals	Ray Marcus	
2017	The Wall	Sergeant Allen "Ize" Isaac	
2018	Outlaw King	James Douglas, Lord of Douglas	
2018	A Million Little Pieces	James Frey	Also writer and producer
2020	Tenet	Ives	
2021	The King's Man	Archie Reid	
2022	Bullet Train	Tangerine	
2024	The Fall Guy	Tom Ryder	
2024	Nosferatu	Friedrich Harding	
2024	Kraven the Hunter	Sergei Kravinoff / Kraven the Hunter	
2025	28 Years Later	Jamie	
2025	Fuze	Major Will Tranter	
2026	Werwulf †	Man	Post-production
2027	Blood on Snow †	Olav	Post-production
TBA	Cry to Heaven †	Guido Maffeo	Post-production

=== Television ===
Year	Title	Role	Notes
2001	Armadillo	Young Lorimer Black	
2003	The Bill	Zac Clough	Episode: "162"
2004	Family Business	Paul Sullivan	1 episode
2004	Feather Boy	Niker	3 episodes
2006	I Shouldn't Be Alive	Mark	4 episodes
2006	Casualty	Joey Byrne	Episode: "Silent Ties"
2007	Talk to Me	Aaron	4 episodes
2007	Coming Up	Eoin	Episode: "99,100"
2007	Nearly Famous	Owen Stephens	6 episodes
2007	Sherlock Holmes and the Baker Street Irregulars	Finch	Television film
2021	Calls	Mark (voice)	Episode: "The Beginning"
TBA	Enigma Variations	Paul	Limited series

=== Video games ===
Year	Title	Voice role
2010	Kick-Ass: The Game	Kick-Ass

== Awards and nominations ==
Year	Association	Work	Category	Result
2009	London Film Critics Circle Awards	Nowhere Boy and Dummy	Young British Performer of the Year	Nominated
2009	British Independent Film Awards	Nowhere Boy	Best Actor	Nominated
2010	Empire Awards	Nowhere Boy	Best Newcomer	Won
2010	Scream Awards	Kick-Ass	Best Breakout Performance - Male	Nominated
2010	Scream Awards	Kick-Ass	Best Fantasy Actor	Nominated
2010	Scream Awards	Kick-Ass	Best Superhero	Nominated
2010	Teen Choice Awards	Kick-Ass	Choice Movie: Male Breakout Star	Nominated
2011	Empire Awards	Kick-Ass	Best Actor	Nominated
2011	British Academy Film Awards	Kick-Ass	Rising Star Award	Nominated
2012	EDA Awards	Anna Karenina	Best Depiction of Nudity, Sexuality, or Seduction (shared with Keira Knightley)	Nominated
2016	San Diego Film Critics Society Awards	Nocturnal Animals	Best Supporting Actor	Nominated
2017	Golden Globe Awards	Nocturnal Animals	Best Supporting Actor – Motion Picture	Won
2017	Santa Barbara International Film Festival	Nocturnal Animals	Virtuoso Award	Won
2017	British Academy Film Awards	Nocturnal Animals	Best Actor in a Supporting Role	Nominated
2022	Locarno Film Festival	Himself	Excellence Award Davide Campari	Won
