= 3 Assassins =

2004 novel by Kōtarō Isaka

Three Assassins
- First edition
- Author: Kōtarō Isaka
- Original title: グラスホッパー (Grasshopper)
- Translator: Sam Malissa
- Language: Japanese
- Series: Hitman
- Release number: 1
- Genre: Dark comedy; Thriller novel
- Publisher: Kadokawa Shoten
- Publication date: September 2004
- Publication place: Japan
- English publication date: April 14, 2022: US: Harvill Secker The Overlook Press
- Pages: 272
- Awards: University Readers' Award
- ISBN: 978-1787303201
- Followed by: Maoh: Juvenile Remix; Bullet Train (Maria Beetle)

Grasshopper (Japanese: グラスホッパー, Hepburn: Gurasuhoppā) is a black humour thriller novel by Japanese author Kōtarō Isaka published in 2004 and later translated to English as Three Assassins. The novel follows a schoolteacher who is drawn into the criminal underworld seeking revenge for the murder of his wife, only to be drawn into protecting a family from a trio of assassins after the target of his revenge is in-turn murdered by someone else. The first novel in Isaka's Hitman trilogy, it was followed by Bullet Train (original Japanese title: Maria Beetle), to which it was marketed as a prequel in English language territories on its translated re-release in 2022, as a tie-in to the Bullet Train film adaptation.

A manga continuation, Maoh: Juvenile Remix, was additionally serialized in Shogakukan's Weekly Shōnen Sunday from June 6, 2007, to June 24, 2009, to which a spin-off series, Waltz, was serialized in Shogakukan's Monthly Shōnen Sunday from October 10, 2009, to February 10, 2012.

The novel was well reviewed, and was adapted as a 2015 Japanese film.

== Plot synopsis ==
Suzuki is just an ordinary man until his wife is murdered. When he discovers the criminal gang responsible, he leaves behind his life as a maths teacher and joins them, looking for a chance to take his revenge. What he doesn't realise is that he's about to get drawn into a web of unusual professional assassins (the titular 3 Assassins), each with their own separate agendas.

- The Whale convinces his victims to take their own lives using just his words.
- The Cicada is a talkative and deadly knife expert.
- The elusive Pusher dispatches his targets in deadly traffic accidents.

Suzuki must take each of them on, to try to find justice and keep his innocence in a world of killers.

== Development ==
In an interview with The Japan Times, Three Assassins English translator Sam Malissa described Three Assassins as "[Kōtarō] Isaka calling out the thriller genre but [a]lso playing with the reader and the complicity of creating an illusion to invite people into the world of story and fabulations. In Japan, there's quite a divide with books funneled to the pulp lane or the serious lane, but Isaka is riding that line between entertainment and more serious fiction, playing with those boundaries and pushing against that division. I'm always appreciative when artists straddle lanes or push boundaries like he does." Comparing the novel to Isaka's sequel novel Bullet Train (translated to English years ahead of its preceding novel), Malissa said that "'Three Assassins' goes deeper, so there's more psychological exploration of the characters, which adds nuanced sophistication to the action."

== Reception ==
The Japan Times praised Three Assassins as a "rollicking good time", together with Bullet Train "showcas[ing] Isaka's versatility as a writer and his skill as an entertainer, forging his own path as he merges literary fiction with high-octane fun." The Unseen Library lauded the novel as "another awesome read from Kotaro Isaka that takes readers on a wild and exciting journey to Japan's outrageous underworld of assassins. Filled with quirky characters, surprising turns and intense action, this is a fantastic novel and you will swiftly get addicted to its entertaining and captivating story [and a] must read for fans of this legendary Japanese author", summarising it to be a "captivating and amusing overall story". with Hot Press complimenting it as a "Triple Tokyo Terminator Throw Down!", and The Irish Examiner expressing interest in the novel being adapted as a sequel to the 2022 Bullet Train film.

Contrasted to Bullet Train, The New York Times lauded "Three Assassins [a]s a sparser, sourer thriller, its slow pursuit distending across Tokyo and leaving plenty of time for dread", concluding that as a "surrealist fable disguised as a crime novel, "Three Assassins" feels like a fever dream that makes sense when you're in it, but whose strange contours linger long after you wake up."

== Adaptations ==
=== Manga adaptation ===
A manga adaptation drawn by Hiroto Ida was published from 2008 to 2010 on Kadokawa Shoten's Young Ace magazine, and later collected in three volumes.

=== Film adaptation ===
The novel inspired a Japanese film adaptation, Grasshopper, directed by Tomoyuki Takimoto and starring Toma Ikuta. The film was released theatrically on November 7, 2015.
