= Grasshopper (film) =

- Poster
- Directed by: Tomoyuki Takimoto
- Based on: Grasshopper (3 Assassins) by Kōtarō Isaka and Sam Malissa (English translation)
- Starring: Toma Ikuta; Tadanobu Asano; Ryosuke Yamada
- Production company: Kadokawa Pictures
- Distributed by: Kadokawa
- Release date: November 7, 2015
- Country: Japan
- Language: Japanese
- Box office: ¥675 million

Grasshopper (グラスホッパー) is a 2015 Japanese revenge thriller film directed by Tomoyuki Takimoto and starring Toma Ikuta, Tadanobu Asano and Hey! Say! JUMP member Ryosuke Yamada. It was released in Japan on November 7, 2015. It is based on the 2004 novel of the same name by Kōtarō Isaka, the first novel in his Hitman series. An American adaptation of the second novel, Bullet Train, was released in 2022.

== Plot ==
After the death of his girlfriend, Suzuki (Ikuta Toma) takes on a job working for the underground. Suzuki is quickly caught up in a cat and mouse game between two groups of underground workers in the field of assassination. Caught up in the game alongside him are Kujira (Tadanobu Asano) and Semi (Ryosuke Yamada), who are both deadly killers.

== Cast ==
- Toma Ikuta as Suzuki
- Tadanobu Asano as Kujira
- Ryosuke Yamada as Semi
- Haru as Yuriko
- Kumiko Asō as Sumire
- Nanao as Hiyoko
- Hidetaka Yoshioka as Asagao
- Renji Ishibashi as Terahara
- Jun Murakami as Iwanishi
- Ryudo Uzaki as Kujira's Father
- Norihito Kaneko as Terahara's son
- Manami Satukawa as young Girl
- Hako Yamasaki as Momo

== Production ==
Principal photography began on 7 July 2014.

== Reception ==
The film grossed ¥192 million on its opening weekend. By its third weekend, it had grossed ¥675 million.
