= Matinee & Soiree =

Japanese manga series by Megumi Osuga

- First tankōbon volume cover

マチネとソワレ (Machine to Soware)
- Manga
- Written by: Megumi Osuga
- Published by: Shogakukan
- Imprint: Shōnen Sunday Comics Special
- Magazine: Monthly Shōnen Sunday
- Original run: November 11, 2016 – present
- Volumes: 19
- icon

Matinee & Soiree (Japanese: マチネとソワレ, Hepburn: Machine to Soware) is a Japanese manga series written and illustrated by Megumi Osuga. It has been serialized in Shogakukan's shōnen manga magazine Monthly Shōnen Sunday since November 2016, with its chapters collected in 19 tankōbon volumes as of September 2026.

== Publication ==
Written and illustrated by Megumi Osuga, Matinee & Soiree started in Shogakukan's shōnen manga magazine Monthly Shōnen Sunday on November 11, 2016. In January 2021, it was announced that the manga entered its climax. Shogakukan has collected its chapters into individual tankōbon volumes. The first volume was released on March 10, 2017. As of September 11, 2026, 19 volumes have been released.

=== Volumes ===
No.	Japanese release date	Japanese ISBN
1	March 10, 2017	978-4-09-127544-8
2	August 10, 2017	978-4-09-127729-9
3	March 12, 2018	978-4-09-128197-5
4	August 9, 2018	978-4-09-128469-3
5	January 11, 2019	978-4-09-128821-9
6	July 12, 2019	978-4-09-129340-4
7	February 12, 2020	978-4-09-129710-5
8	August 12, 2020	978-4-09-850211-0
9	April 12, 2021	978-4-09-850495-4
10	December 10, 2021	978-4-09-850824-2
11	June 10, 2022	978-4-09-851173-0
12	December 12, 2022	978-4-09-851438-0
13	May 12, 2023	978-4-09-852019-0
14	December 12, 2023	978-4-09-853041-0
15	June 12, 2024	978-4-09-853403-6
16	January 10, 2025	978-4-09-853820-1
17	July 11, 2025	978-4-09-854186-7
18	February 12, 2026	978-4-09-854417-2
19	September 11, 2026	978-4-09-854822-4

== See also ==
- Maoh: Juvenile Remix, another manga series illustrated by Megumi Osuga
