= Bullet Train (film) =

2022 film by David Leitch

- Theatrical release poster
- Directed by: David Leitch
- Screenplay by: Zak Olkewicz
- Based on: Bullet Train by Kōtarō Isaka
- Produced by: Kelly McCormick; David Leitch; Antoine Fuqua
- Starring: Brad Pitt; Joey King; Aaron Taylor-Johnson; Brian Tyree Henry; Andrew Koji; Hiroyuki Sanada; Michael Shannon; Benito A. Martínez Ocasio; Sandra Bullock
- Cinematography: Jonathan Sela
- Edited by: Elísabet Ronaldsdóttir
- Music by: Dominic Lewis
- Production companies: Columbia Pictures; 87North Productions
- Distributed by: Sony Pictures Releasing
- Release dates: July 18, 2022 (Grand Rex); August 5, 2022 (United States)
- Running time: 126 minutes
- Country: United States
- Language: English
- Budget: $85.9–90 million
- Box office: $239.3 million

Bullet Train is a 2022 American action comedy film directed by David Leitch. Based on the 2010 Japanese novel by Kōtarō Isaka, it centers around a group of assassins on a Japanese high-speed train who end up in conflict with each other. The ensemble cast consists of Brad Pitt, Joey King, Aaron Taylor-Johnson, Brian Tyree Henry, Andrew Koji, Hiroyuki Sanada, Michael Shannon, Bad Bunny, and Sandra Bullock. Principal photography began in Los Angeles in November 2020 and concluded in March 2021 amid the COVID-19 pandemic.

Bullet Train premiered in Paris on July 18, 2022, and was theatrically released in the United States on August 5. The film received mixed reviews from critics and sparked a whitewashing controversy over its predominantly non-Japanese cast in a Japanese-set novel adaptation. It grossed $239 million on a production budget of $86–90 million.

== Plot ==
Yuichi Kimura ("the Father"), boards a bullet train departing Tokyo to find the person who pushed his young son Wataru from a rooftop, leaving him comatose. At the same time, an American freelance operative codenamed "Ladybug"—whose "bad luck" often kills those around him, although he always survives—embarks on the train on a mission in which he is a last-minute replacement for a colleague named Carver and is being guided remotely by his handler, Maria, to retrieve a briefcase from the train. Also aboard are British assassin brothers "Lemon" and "Tangerine", who are escorting "the Son" to his father, a ruthless Russian-born yakuza boss known as the White Death, and are also to deliver the briefcase, containing cash, to him.

Soon after departure, the Son is found fatally poisoned. Ladybug quietly takes the briefcase but is confronted by another assassin, "the Wolf", who mistakenly believes him responsible for the death of his wife at their wedding. During their fight, the Wolf accidentally kills himself with his own knife. Meanwhile, Yuichi identifies his son's attacker: a manipulative schoolgirl assassin ("the Prince"). She reveals she lured Yuichi onto the train to force him to kill the White Death, threatening Wataru's life through a henchman at the hospital.

Lemon encounters Ladybug and, recalling him from a failed job in Johannesburg, suspects him of murdering the Son. They fight, leaving Lemon briefly unconscious; Ladybug drugs his water with sleeping powder and escapes. The Prince locates the briefcase, rigs it with explosives, and sabotages Yuichi's gun to explode if fired. Ladybug later clashes with Tangerine and knocks him off the train, though Tangerine manages to climb back aboard. Lemon, increasingly suspicious, shoots Yuichi and prepares to shoot the Prince, but collapses from the drugged water. The Prince shoots Lemon in return and hides both men in a bathroom.

Ladybug then meets "the Hornet", the assassin responsible for poisoning both the Wolf's wedding party and the Son using boomslang venom. After a struggle, both are exposed to the poison, but Ladybug secures the antivenom first, and the Hornet dies. Believing Lemon to be dead, Tangerine confronts the Prince, but before he can act, Ladybug, unaware of her identity, intervenes and kills Tangerine.

At the next stop, Yuichi's father, "the Elder", boards the train and confronts the Prince. He reveals her henchman has been killed and Wataru is safe, and the Prince flees. The Elder explains to Ladybug that the White Death previously murdered his wife during his takeover of the yakuza, and he intends to confront him. Reuniting with the wounded Yuichi and the recovering Lemon, the group joins Ladybug to prepare for the White Death's arrival.

When the train reaches Kyoto, Ladybug hands over the briefcase to the White Death. The Prince, revealed to be the White Death's estranged daughter, tries to provoke her father into shooting her with the sabotaged gun, but he refuses. The White Death explains that everyone on the train was tangentially connected to his wife's death: Lemon and Tangerine had drawn him abroad, leaving his family vulnerable; his Son's troubles forced his wife to travel; Carver caused the car crash that fatally injured her; and the Hornet poisoned the surgeon who might have saved her. He gathered them hoping they would eliminate one another, unaware Ladybug had replaced Carver.

The White Death's men open the briefcase, triggering the Prince's bomb and throwing Ladybug and the White Death back onto the moving train. A violent fight erupts with the remaining gunmen. Lemon tackles one off the train into a river, while the Elder duels the White Death. The out-of-control train eventually crashes into a neighborhood in Kyoto.

After the wreck, the White Death, impaled by the Elder's katana, attempts to kill Ladybug but fires the Prince's sabotaged gun, which explodes and kills him. The Prince then threatens Ladybug, Yuichi, and the Elder, only to be run over by a truck driven by Lemon. Maria arrives to collect Ladybug as authorities respond to the crash.

== Cast ==
- Brad Pitt as Ladybug, an American (former) assassin who is suffering from anxiety and laments his persistently bad luck.
- Joey King as the Prince, a manipulative young assassin disguised as a schoolgirl, who seeks vengeance on the White Death, her estranged father.
- Aaron Taylor-Johnson as Tangerine, a British assassin, Lemon's twin brother.
  - Miles Marz as young Tangerine.
- Brian Tyree Henry as Lemon, a British assassin, Tangerine's twin brother with an obsession with Thomas the Tank Engine.
  - Joshua Johnson-Payne as young Lemon.
- Andrew Koji as Yuichi Kimura / the Father, a yakuza member whose son Wataru was pushed off a building by the Prince.
- Hiroyuki Sanada as the Elder, Yuichi's father and Wataru's grandfather.
  - Yoshi Sudarso as young Elder.
- Michael Shannon as the White Death, a Russian Crime Lord, who took over a yakuza group.
- Bad Bunny (credited as Benito A. Martínez Ocasio) as the Wolf, a Mexican assassin, who seeks vengeance on the Hornet.
  - Ian Martinez as young Wolf.
- Sandra Bullock as Maria, Ladybug's contact and handler.
- Zazie Beetz as the Hornet, an assassin who specializes in poisons.
- Logan Lerman as the Son, the White Death's son.
- Masi Oka as the train conductor.
- Karen Fukuhara as Kayda Izumi, the concession girl.

In addition, Channing Tatum and Ryan Reynolds appear in uncredited cameo roles as a train passenger and as assassin Carver, respectively. Reynolds accepted the cameo as a thank-you to Pitt for his own cameo in Deadpool 2 (2018), a film also directed by Leitch. Leitch appears briefly as Jeff Zufelt, the 17th person killed (albeit unintentionally) by Lemon and Tangerine while rescuing the Son.

== Production ==
=== Development and casting ===
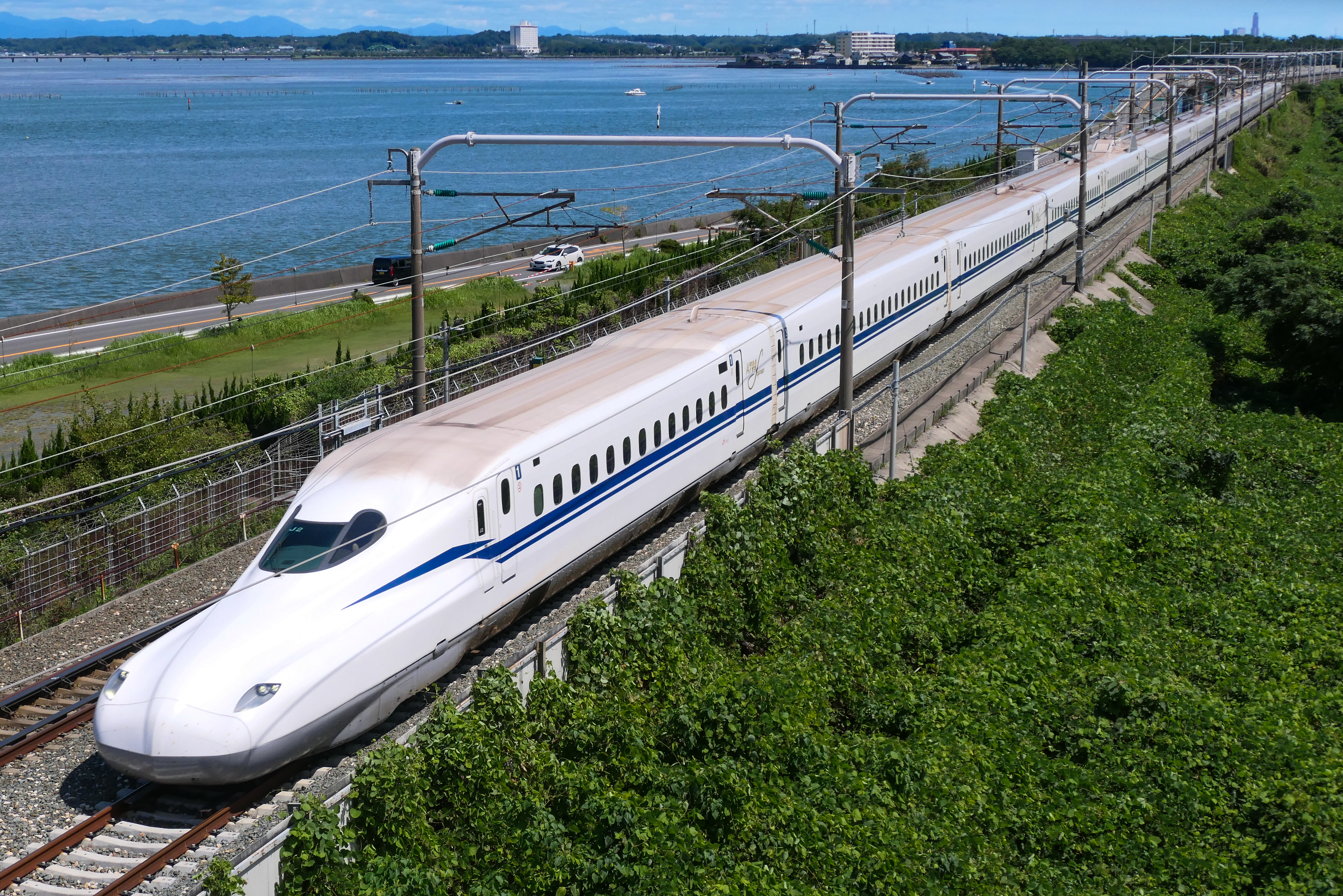
The high-speed Tōkaidō Shinkansen, upon which the film was based

Bullet Train had been initially developed by Antoine Fuqua – who co-produced the film – through his Fuqua Films banner. It was originally intended to be a serious action thriller, but the project turned into a light-hearted action comedy during the development process.

It was announced in June 2020 that Sony Pictures had hired David Leitch to direct the adaptation of the Kōtarō Isaka sequel novel from a screenplay by Zak Olkewicz, with Brad Pitt being cast in the film the following month. Variety reported that Pitt was paid $20 million. Joey King subsequently entered negotiations for a supporting role, while in September, Andrew Koji was added, with Aaron Taylor-Johnson and Brian Tyree Henry joining in October. In November 2020, Zazie Beetz, Masi Oka, Michael Shannon, Logan Lerman, and Hiroyuki Sanada joined the cast, with Leitch revealing in December that Karen Fukuhara had also joined, and that Jonathan Sela would serve as cinematographer. That same month, singer Bad Bunny (credited as his real name, Benito A Martínez Ocasio) was also added to the cast, and Sandra Bullock joined the following year in February to replace Lady Gaga, who had dropped out due to scheduling conflicts with House of Gucci (2021). Damson Idris was offered a part but had to turn it down.

=== Filming ===
Production for Bullet Train began in October 2020 in Los Angeles. The production budget was reportedly $85.9 to 90 million. Filming started on November 16, 2020, and wrapped in March 2021. The producers constructed three full train cars, and LED screens with video footage of the Japanese countryside were hung outside the windows of the train set to help immerse the actors. Stunt coordinator Greg Rementer said Pitt performed 95% of his own stunts in the film.

== Music ==
The film features a number of original tracks. Most notably, the film contains Japanese-language covers of "Stayin' Alive" by the Bee Gees and "Holding Out for a Hero" by Bonnie Tyler. Composer Dominic Lewis noted that the film's soundtrack represents "all vibe and no technique".

== Release ==
Bullet Train was originally set to be released on April 8, 2022, before being delayed to July 15, 2022, again to July 29, and then to August 5. Its world premiere occurred at the Grand Rex in Paris, France on July 18, 2022.

The film was released on 4K UHD, Blu-ray and DVD on October 18, 2022, with the digital version released on September 27, 2022. Bullet Train was released on Netflix in the US on December 3, 2022, as part of a deal made by Sony and Netflix in 2021. Sony signed a deal giving Disney access to their legacy content, including Bullet Train to stream on Disney+ and Hulu and appear on Disney's linear television networks. Disney's access to Sony's titles would come following their availability on Netflix.

== Reception ==
=== Box office ===
Bullet Train grossed $103.4 million in the United States and Canada, and $135.9 million in other territories, for a worldwide total of $239.3 million.

In the United States and Canada, Bullet Train was released alongside Easter Sunday, and was projected to gross $26–30 million from 4,357 theaters in its opening weekend. It made $12.6 million on its first day, including $4.6 million from Thursday night previews. It went on to debut to $30 million, topping the box office. It made $13.4 million in its sophomore weekend, remaining in first. It made $8 million in its third weekend, falling to third.

Outside of the United States and Canada, the top five highest grossing markets were the United Kingdom, France, Mexico, Australia and Spain. In Japan, the film grossed $7,092,566.

=== Critical response ===
The film received mixed reviews from critics. On the review aggregator website Rotten Tomatoes, 52% of 341 critics' reviews are positive, with an average rating of 5.6/10. The website's consensus reads: "Bullet Train's colorful cast and high-speed action are almost enough to keep things going after the story runs out of track." Metacritic gave the film a weighted average score of 49 out of 100, based on 61 critics, indicating "mixed or average" reviews. However, audiences widely praised the film; those polled by CinemaScore gave the film an average grade of "B+" on an A+ to F scale, while PostTrak gave the film an 82% overall positive score, with 63% saying they would definitely recommend it.

Richard Roeper of the Chicago Sun-Times rated the film three and a half out of four stars, calling it "wildly entertaining" and praised the performances, "the creative and blood-spattered action sequences" and most of all the writing. Peter Debruge of Variety wrote, "Bullet Train feels like it comes from the same brain as Snatch, wearing its pop style on its sleeve – a Kill Bill-like mix of martial arts, manga and gabby hitman movie influences, minus the vision or wit that implies."

Robbie Collin of The Daily Telegraph gave the film a one out of five scoring, saying, "As a motor-mouthing smart-ass, the 58-year-old Pitt is badly miscast – every detail here seems tailored to Ryan Reynolds, director David Leitch's Deadpool collaborator –the film's bulging cast and bloated running time recalls those all-star capers of the 1960s: imagine It's a Mad, Mad, Mad, Mad World crossed with a migraine." In a two out of five review, Clarisse Loughrey of The Independent said, "Pitt's funny here, but Bullet Train feels so try-hard in its quirky theatrics that it's a little like watching a kid repeatedly calling for their mother's attention before they cartwheel into a brick wall." Donald Clark of The Irish Times earned a two out of five scoring, stating that "the plot is a tagliatelle of insubstantiality. Just assume that everyone is set to double-cross everyone else. The dialogue, alas, dwells far too much in the pop-culture miasma that may be Quentin Tarantino's most regrettable gift to the culture."

=== Representation of race in casting ===
The casting of several non-Asian actors, including Brad Pitt and Joey King, prompted accusations of whitewashing characters who were Japanese in Kōtarō Isaka's novel. David Inoue, executive director of the Japanese American Citizens League, criticized the casting, stating that while American actors would have been appropriate if the setting were changed to the United States, the filmmakers still used the novel's Japanese setting while relegating its Japanese characters to secondary or background roles, strengthening charges of whitewashing. Inoue also questioned the actors' allyship to the Asian community for knowingly accepting whitewashed roles, and further criticized the film for pushing the "belief that Asian actors in the leading roles cannot carry a blockbuster", despite the recent successes of Asian-led Hollywood films such as Crazy Rich Asians (2018) or Shang-Chi and the Legend of the Ten Rings (2021).

Eric Francisco of Inverse wrote, "Unless you saw the individual character posters, you'd be unlikely to think Bullet Train actually stars any Asian talent. Hollywood supposedly doesn't cast Asian leads because they aren't stars, but the truth is, they aren't stars because Hollywood won't cast Asian leads. How can audiences get excited about buying tickets to see Asian actors when their existence in a movie is barely acknowledged?"

When asked about the casting, Isaka defended the film and described his characters as "ethnically malleable", maintaining that his original Japanese setting and context were irrelevant as they were "not real people, maybe they're not even Japanese". Sony Pictures Motion Picture Group president Sanford Panitch highlighted Isaka's views to defend the casting, reassuring that the film would honor the novel's "Japanese soul" while giving the opportunity to cast big name stars and adapt it on a "global scale". Bullet Train screenwriter Zak Olkewicz argued that the decision to cast beyond Japanese or Asian actors proved "the strength of [Isaka]'s work" as it was a story that could "transcend race". Director David Leitch noted that discussions had taken place during pre-production to change the film's setting, but it was ultimately decided to keep Isaka's original location of Tokyo due to its international appeal.

Guy Aoki, President of Media Action Network for Asian Americans (MANAA), called Isaka's defense "a laughable statement", noting that the characters in the book were "clearly Japanese" and denounced Isaka as an "embarrassing sellout". Aoki also criticized Olkewicz's and Leitch's responses, as a "strong" story would not be risky to cast more Japanese or Asian actors in major roles and accused the filmmakers of using the film's casting of Black and Latino actors to downplay accusations of whitewashing. Elaborating further, Francisco noted that Isaka, who is a Japanese national, and most audiences in Asia "enjoy their own domestic film industry and go to Hollywood for the spectacle of foreigners", noting the differences between Asians in Asia and Asian American issues.

=== Accolades ===
At the 2022 People's Choice Awards, the film was nominated for The Movie of 2022 and Action Movie of 2022; Brad Pitt was nominated for Male Movie Star of 2022; and Joey King was nominated for Female Movie Star of 2022 and Action Movie Star of 2022. At the 51st Saturn Awards, the film was nominated Best Action/Adventure Film.
