= Maoh: Juvenile Remix =

Japanese manga series by Kōtarō Isaka and Megumi Ōsuga

- Cover of the first volume

魔王 Juvenile Remix
- Genre: Crime; Political thriller; Supernatural thriller
- Manga
- Written by: Kōtarō Isaka
- Illustrated by: Megumi Ōsuga
- Published by: Shogakukan
- English publisher: NA: Viz Media
- Imprint: Shōnen Sunday Comics
- Magazine: Weekly Shōnen Sunday
- Original run: June 6, 2007 – June 24, 2009
- Volumes: 10
- Manga

Waltz
- Written by: Kōtarō Isaka
- Illustrated by: Megumi Ōsuga
- Published by: Shogakukan
- Imprint: Monthly Shōnen Sunday Comics
- Magazine: Monthly Shōnen Sunday
- Original run: October 10, 2009 – February 10, 2012
- Volumes: 6
- icon

Maoh: Juvenile Remix (Japanese: 魔王 ~JUVENILE REMIX~, Hepburn: Maō Jubunairu Rimikkusu; lit. 'Demon King') is a Japanese manga series written by Kōtarō Isaka and illustrated by Megumi Ōsuga, both adapting and serving as a continuation of Isaka's 2004 novel Three Assassins (Grasshopper), the first novel in his Hitman novel trilogy, and his 2005 short story collection Maō. The series is about a young man who discovered his power and uncovered a rising leader's secret to rule Nekota city. It was serialized in Shogakukan's Weekly Shōnen Sunday from June 2007 to June 2009 and compiled into ten tankōbon volumes. In North America, the series was licensed for English release by Viz Media.

== Plot ==
Andō is a high-school student who possesses the ability to make anyone within a 30-step radius to say whatever he thinks. Inukai is the young chief of the Grass Hopper, a self-defense force who claims to maintain Nekota town's peace. When Andō realizes that Inukai is using inhumane methods to control the population, he decides to stop Inukai with his ability. However, Andō is not the only enemy Inukai has, and vice-versa.

== Characters ==
Ando (安藤)
Resident of the fictional Nekota city (based in Kanto region) and a second-year student at Nekota East High. He did not agree with Inukai's way to change the world and fought against his group, the Grasshopper.
Junya Ando (安藤 潤也, Andō Jun'ya)
The younger brother of Ando.
Shunji Inukai (犬養 舜二, Inukai Shunji)
The founder and leader of the Grasshopper (グラスホッパー, Gurasuhoppā), an influencing organization with many relations in the Japanese political world. He is the charismatic person who can manipulate many people.
Master (マスター, Masutā)
The master of Duce cafe and Inukai's trusted ally. Later revealed to be an ESP user.
Semi (蝉; "Cicada")
An assassin first sent to kill the older Ando, but spared him instead because of his assassination contract being cancelled.
Mr. Anderson (Mr.アンダーソン, Mr. Andāson)
An American influencing businessman and president of the Anderson Group who wants to make his project building the "New City" in Nekota city.
Anderson (アンダーソン, Andāson)
A half-American, half-Japanese student who later attends the same class with the older Ando. Due to Inukai's influences, Nekota residents' rage for the Anderson Group (a company managed by his father) intensely increase which make Anderson's classmates and other students behave violently towards the younger Anderson.
Machiko (満智子)
A girl who is a third-year student and president of Nekota High's Newspaper club in which the Ando brothers are members.
Shiori (詩織)
Junya's girlfriend.
Kaname (要)
A boy who is the classmate of the older Ando. He was a bully victim before being contacted with Inukai.
Suzumebachi (スズメバチ; "Hornet")
An assassin hired by Mr. Anderson to kill a great number of members of Grasshopper.
Shima (島)
The older Ando's friend in Nekota Highschool.
Asagao (槿; "Hawaiian hibiscus")
A top-notch assassin and the father of Kentaro and Kojiro.
Kentaro (健太郎, Kentarō) and Kojiro (孝次郎, Kōjirō)
The twin brothers who can use ESP since their young age.
Iwanishi (嵒蠁)
A dealer who manages Semi's contracts, and is much feared/respected by Semi.

== Publication ==
Written by Kōtarō Isaka and illustrated by Megumi Ōsuga, Maoh: Juvenile Remix is based on Isaka's own novels, Three Assassins (Grasshopper) and Maō (respectively published by Kodansha in 2004 and 2005). It was serialized in Shogakukan's Weekly Shōnen Sunday from June 6, 2007, to June 24, 2009. Shogakukan collected its chapters into ten tankōbon volumes, released from November 16, 2007, to August 18, 2009.

Viz Media licensed the manga for English release in North America in 2009. The ten volumes were released from May 11, 2010, to April 10, 2012.

A spin-off series, titled Waltz, was serialized in Shogakukan's Monthly Shōnen Sunday from October 10, 2009, to February 10, 2012. Shogakukan collected the chapters in six tankōbon volumes, released from March 12, 2010, to May 11, 2012.

=== Volumes ===
No.	Original release date	Original ISBN	English release date	English ISBN
1	November 16, 2007	978-4-09-121224-5	May 11, 2010	978-1-4215-3428-2
2	November 16, 2007	978-4-09-121254-2	August 10, 2010	978-1-4215-3429-9
3	February 18, 2008	978-4-09-121285-6	November 9, 2010	978-1-4215-3430-5
4	May 16, 2008	978-4-09-121388-4	February 8, 2011	978-1-4215-3431-2
5	August 11, 2008	978-4-09-121449-2	May 10, 2011	978-1-4215-3432-9
6	November 18, 2008	978-4-09-121507-9	August 9, 2011	978-1-4215-3433-6
7	February 18, 2009	978-4-09-121594-9	October 11, 2011	978-1-4215-3495-4
8	April 17, 2009	978-4-09-121897-1	December 13, 2011	978-1-4215-3496-1
9	June 18, 2009	978-4-09-122017-2	February 14, 2012	978-1-4215-4038-2
10	August 18, 2009	978-4-09-121719-6	April 10, 2012	978-1-4215-4039-9

== See also ==
- Matinee & Soiree, another manga series illustrated by Megumi Osuga
