= Matt Holloway =

- Born: Matt Holloway; 16 January 1985 (age 41) Christchurch, New Zealand
- Height: 1.80 m (5 ft 11 in)
- Weight: 105 kg (16 st 7 lb)

Rugby union career
- Position: Hooker
Senior career
Years	Team	Apps	(Points)
2010–	Southland		
2010–	Wasps		
2009	Counties		
2007–2008	Southland		

Matt Holloway (born 16 January 1985) is a New Zealand born rugby union player. He played for London Wasps A in the United Kingdom after playing for Counties Manukau Steelers in the 2009 Air New Zealand Cup on loan from Southland who he played for in 2007 and 2008. He also played for the 2005 New Zealand Under-21s who finished third at the 2005 Under 21 Rugby World Championship.
