= Sanford Panitch =

American film industry executive

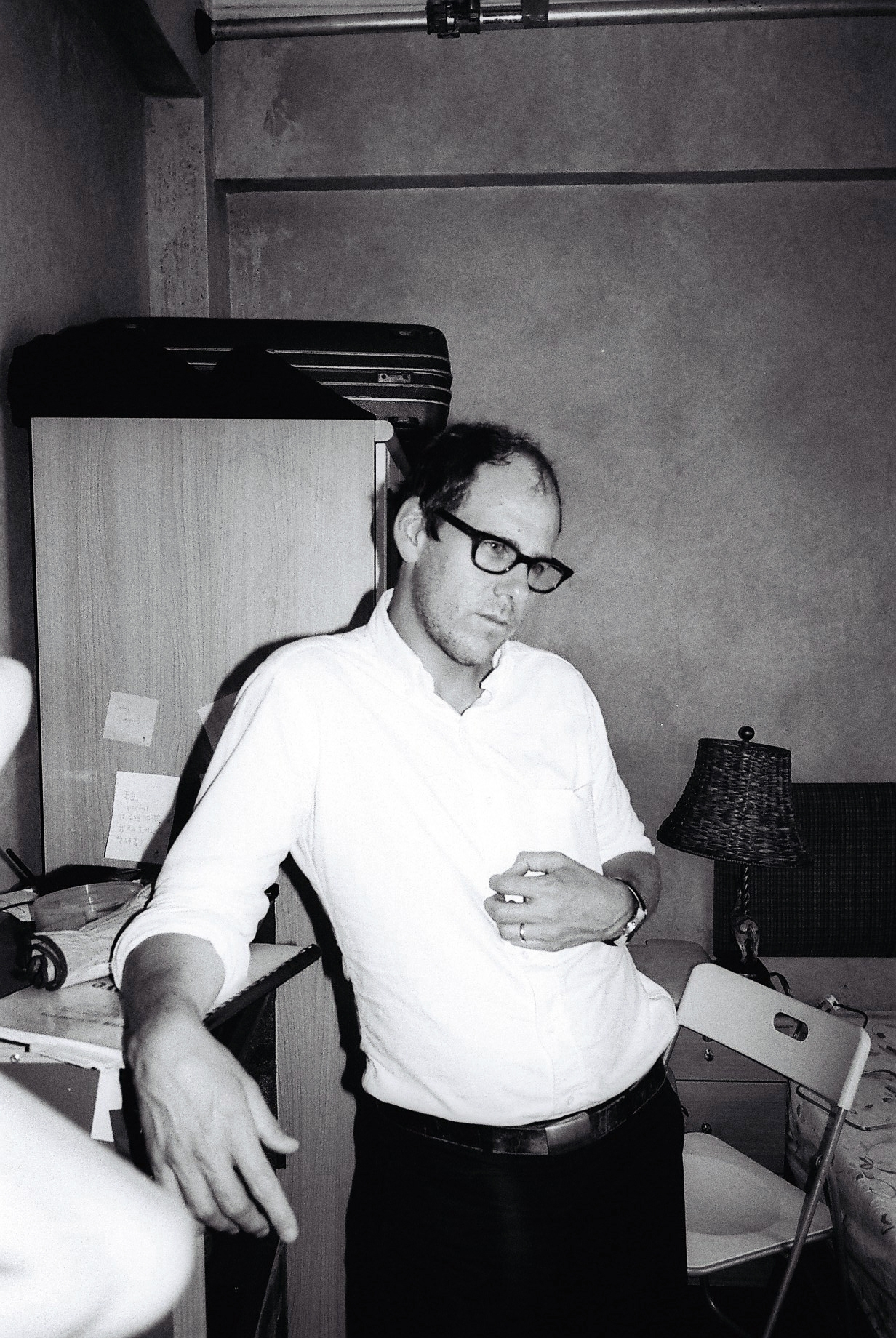
- Born: Los Angeles, California
- Education: Tulane University
- Occupation: Film industry executive
- Title: President, Sony Pictures Motion Picture Group

Sanford Panitch is an American film industry executive. The president of Sony Pictures Motion Picture Group, he served previously as president of Columbia Pictures.

== Early life and education ==
Panitch was born in Los Angeles, to Hersh Panitch, an entertainment business manager, and Elaine Panitch, a teacher and author. He attended Tulane University in New Orleans. During school breaks Panitch interned for New Line Cinema, and as a student he founded Revive Screening to distribute New Line Films at various venues in New Orleans. After graduating from Tulane with a degree in Political Science, Panitch sold the company and returned to Los Angeles.

== Career ==
In 1995, Panitch was named executive vice president of Production at 20th Century Fox. In 2008, recognizing the growth of international box office and seeing the large percentage of market share for locally produced films, Panitch founded Fox International Productions. He served as its president until April 2015, when he joined Sony Pictures as president of international film and television. In June 2016, he was named President of Columbia Pictures. He was promoted to president of Sony Motion Picture Group in October 2019.
