= Bullet Train (novel) =

2010 novel by Kōtarō Isaka

- Japanese cover
- Author: Kōtarō Isaka
- Original title: マリアビートル (Maria Beetle)
- Translator: Sam Malissa
- Language: Japanese
- Series: Hitman
- Release number: 2 (novel); 4 (overall)
- Genre: Dark comedy; Crime novel
- Publisher: Kadokawa Shoten
- Publication date: September 2010
- Publication place: Japan
- English publication date: April 2021: US: The Overlook Press
- Pages: 465
- Awards: University Readers' Award
- ISBN: 9784048741057
- Preceded by: 3 Assassins; Maoh: Juvenile Remix; Waltz
- Followed by: AX

Maria Beetle (Japanese: マリアビートル, Hepburn: Mariabītoru) is a dark comedy crime novel by Japanese author Kōtarō Isaka published in 2010 and later translated to English as Bullet Train. It follows several hitmen aboard a Tōhoku Shinkansen Hayate train, each on a different mission, interconnected in some way. The novel was well reviewed, and was adapted to the Japanese stage in 2018, as well as a 2022 American film.

It is the second novel in Isaka's Hitman trilogy, after 3 Assassins (original Japanese title: Grasshopper), published in 2004, and before AX in 2017, with characters from the novel also being incorporated into the spin-off manga series Waltz, serialized in Shogakukan's Monthly Shōnen Sunday from October 10, 2009 to February 10, 2012.

== Plot ==
At Tokyo Station, Yuichi Kimura, a former hitman, boards the "Hayate" train on the Tōhoku Shinkansen bound for Morioka to take revenge against the teenage Satoshi Oji, who is referred to as "the Prince" by his friends. Kimura's six-year-old son, Wataru, is in a coma after the Prince pushed him off the roof of an apartment building for fun. However, the Prince knows exactly who Kimura is and actually lured him onto the train. When Kimura approaches, the Prince knocks him out with an improvised taser and ties him up. The confident Prince is a sociopath who likes to manipulate people, and when Kimura awakes, the Prince takes control of him, threatening Wataru's life; an acquaintance is watching over him in the hospital and will kill him if the Prince is harmed and unable to answer his phone.

Tangerine and Lemon are an odd couple of skillful hitmen; Tangerine is composed and well-read, while Lemon is frantic and obsessed with Thomas & Friends. The pair just rescued the kidnapped son of mob boss Yoshio Minegishi, and they are returning the boy and suitcase of ransom money to Minegishi in Morioka. Lemon misplaces the suitcase, and Minegishi's son mysteriously ends up dead while they leave him unattended. At each station on the way, Minegishi's subordinates are also assigned to check on their progress, so Tangerine tries to think of a way out.

Nanao is a hitman with the code name "Ladybug", who constantly laments how unlucky he is; every job he takes has been successful, but somewhere it goes wrong and becomes much more difficult than anticipated. His handler Maria has procured him the easiest job she could: to board the Shinkansen at Tokyo Station, steal the suitcase from Tangerine and Lemon, and immediately get off at Ueno Station. When he tries to get off in Ueno, he comes face to face with "the Wolf", another hitman with a vendetta against Ladybug, who is about to board the same train car. Recognizing Ladybug, the Wolf doesn't let him off and brags about his luck taking on a new contract and meeting Ladybug at the same time. Ladybug gets the upper hand in a brief struggle and unintentionally breaks the Wolf's neck when the train rocks. Meanwhile, the Prince comes by to use the restroom and notices something is odd as Ladybug holds up the Wolf, awkwardly calling him a drunk friend, and tries to shoo the Prince away. Ladybug hides the Wolf's corpse in a seat, takes the photo of the Wolf's target, and hides the suitcase in a hidden compartment in the trash receptacle while he finds a seat to wait for the next station, where Maria tells him to get off. When the Prince returns, he discovers the hidden suitcase and tries to think of ways to further manipulate other passengers for his entertainment.

Each of the three sets of hitmen escapes from their own crisis, and the Prince takes action on the immobile Shinkansen to play with the adults.

== Reception ==
It received a starred review from Publishers Weekly as well as Booklist, where Christine Tran described it as "a twisty, darkly hilarious game of musical chairs that draws out the train's hidden army of assassins and a strong dose of Machiavellian justice." Reviewers praised the fast pacing and the darkly comedic elements of the story.

=== Accolades ===
Award	Result	Ref.
University Readers' Award	Won	
Crime Fiction in Translation Dagger	Shortlisted	
Strand Critics Awards for Best Debut Novel	Won	

== Adaptations ==
=== Stage ===
Maria Beetle was adapted as a stage play in Japan in February 2018.

=== Film ===
The novel also inspired the Hollywood film adaptation, Bullet Train, directed by David Leitch and starring Brad Pitt. The film was released theatrically on August 5, 2022.
