= Sony Pictures Motion Picture Group =

Sony Pictures Entertainment division

- Formerly: Columbia TriStar Motion Picture Group (1998–2013)
- Type: Division
- Industry: Entertainment
- Founded: 1998; 28 years ago Hollywood, Los Angeles, California, U.S.
- Headquarters: 10202 West Washington Boulevard, Culver City, California, U.S.
- Area served: Worldwide
- Key people: Tom Rothman (chairman and CEO); Sanford Panitch (president)
- Products: Motion pictures
- Services: Film production and distribution
- Parent: Sony Pictures Entertainment
- Subsidiaries: Columbia Pictures; TriStar Pictures; Screen Gems; 3000 Pictures; Sony Pictures Animation; Sony Pictures Classics; Sony Pictures Imageworks
- Website: sonypictures.com/movies

Sony Pictures Motion Picture Group (formerly known as the Columbia TriStar Motion Picture Group until 2013, and abbreviated as SPMPG) is a division of Sony Pictures Entertainment to manage its motion picture operations. It was launched in 1998 by integrating the businesses of Columbia Pictures and TriStar Pictures.

== History ==
The Sony Pictures Motion Picture Group was founded in 1998 as the Columbia TriStar Motion Picture Group, as a current division of Sony Pictures Entertainment, owned by Sony. It has many of Sony Pictures' current motion picture divisions as part of it. Its divisions at that time were Columbia Pictures, TriStar Pictures, Triumph Films, Sony Pictures Classics, and Sony Pictures Releasing.

On December 8, 1998, SPE resurrected its former animation and television division Screen Gems as a film division of Sony Pictures Entertainment's Columbia TriStar Motion Picture Group that has served several different purposes for its parent companies over the decades since its incorporation, specifically to fill the void left by the shuttering of Triumph Films.

In 2002, Columbia TriStar Television was renamed as Sony Pictures Television. The last three remaining companies, with the "Columbia TriStar" brand in its name, were Columbia TriStar Home Entertainment, the Columbia TriStar Motion Picture Group, and Columbia TriStar Marketing Group. Columbia TriStar Home Entertainment and Columbia TriStar Film Distributors International became Sony Pictures Home Entertainment and Sony Pictures Releasing International in 2004 and 2005 and Columbia TriStar Motion Picture Group became the second-to-last subsidiary of Sony Pictures Entertainment to use the "Columbia TriStar" brand name in its name.

In 2013, TriStar Productions was launched, as a joint venture of Sony Pictures Entertainment and former 20th Century Fox chairman Thomas Rothman.

In October 2013, Sony Pictures rebranded its motion picture group under the moniker "Sony Pictures Motion Picture Group". Sony Pictures Animation and Sony Pictures Imageworks were moved from Sony Pictures Digital to its motion picture group.

On June 2, 2016, Doug Belgrad had announced he was to step down as president of the SPMPG and would transition his role to producer at the studio. Belgrad was promoted as president of the SPMPG back in 2014.

== Film divisions ==
Studio divisions
Production and distribution	Distribution arms	Other
Columbia Pictures; TriStar Pictures (TriStar Productions); Screen Gems (Scream Gems); Sony Pictures Animation; Sony Pictures Classics; Sony Pictures Imageworks; 3000 Pictures; Sony Pictures Worldwide Acquisitions (Destination Films, Stage 6 Films, and Affirm Films); Sony Pictures International Productions	Sony Pictures Releasing; Sony Pictures Releasing International; Sony Pictures Home Entertainment	Ghost Corps; Triumph Films; Columbia TriStar Marketing Group

== 3000 Pictures ==
3000 Pictures, Inc.
- Type: Subsidiary
- Industry: Motion pictures
- Founded: 2019; 7 years ago
- Key people: Elizabeth Gabler (president)
- Parent: Sony Pictures Motion Picture Group

On July 15, 2019, former Fox 2000 Pictures president Elizabeth Gabler and the entire Fox 2000 staff joined Sony Pictures Entertainment and formed 3000 Pictures with the motion picture group. HarperCollins would be funding half of the division's overhead and development. 3000 Pictures would also pursue projects for TV and streaming.

=== Filmography ===
Title	Director	Release date	Gross (worldwide)	Notes
Where the Crawdads Sing	Olivia Newman	July 15, 2022 (United States)	$144.3 million	co-production with Columbia Pictures, HarperCollins Publishers, and Hello Sunshine, distributed by Sony Pictures Releasing
Lady Chatterley's Lover	Laure de Clermont-Tonnerre	November 25, 2022 (UK/US) December 2, 2022 (Netflix)	—N/a	co-production with Laurence Mark Productions, Blueprint Pictures, and HarperCollins; distributed by Netflix
People We Meet on Vacation	Brett Haley	January 9, 2026 (Netflix)	—N/a	co-production with HarperCollins Publishers and Temple Hill Entertainment; distributed by Netflix
Klara and the Sun	Taika Waititi	October 23, 2026 (United States)	$1.8 million	co-production with Columbia Pictures, Spyglass Media Group, HarperCollins Publishers, Heyday Films, Defender Films and Piki Films; distributed by Sony Pictures Releasing

==== Upcoming ====
- City on Fire (TBA)
- Single Female (TBA)

== Sony Pictures Releasing ==
Sony Pictures Releasing Corporation
- Logo used since 2026
- Type: Subsidiary
- Industry: Motion pictures
- Predecessor: Triumph Releasing Corporation
- Founded: November 23, 1994; 31 years ago
- Headquarters: 10202 West Washington Boulevard, Culver City, California, United States
- Key people: Adam Bergerman (president)
- Services: Film distribution; Marketing
- Parent: Sony Pictures
- Divisions: Sony Pictures Releasing International, Inc.
- Website: sonypictures.com

Logo used from 2005 to 2026

Sony Pictures Releasing Corporation is an American film distributor owned by Sony. Established in 1994 as a successor to Triumph Releasing Corporation, the company handles theatrical distribution, marketing and promotion for films produced and released by Sony Pictures, including Columbia Pictures, TriStar Pictures (as well as TriStar Productions), Screen Gems, Inc., Sony Pictures Classics, Sony Pictures Animation, Crunchyroll, Stage 6 Films, Affirm Films, Destination Films, and Triumph Films. It is a member of the Sony Pictures Motion Picture Group. It also has an international division called Sony Pictures Releasing International, which from 1991 to 2005 was known as Columbia TriStar Film Distributors International.

=== International arrangements ===
Sony Pictures Releasing International Corporation
- Logo used since 2026
- Formerly: Columbia Tri-Star Film Distributors International, Inc. (1988–1991); Columbia TriStar Film Distributors International, Inc. (1991–2005)
- Type: Subsidiary
- Industry: Motion pictures
- Founded: December 21, 1988; 37 years ago
- Headquarters: 10202 West Washington Boulevard, Culver City, California, United States
- Services: International film distribution; Marketing
- Parent: Sony Pictures
- Website: sonypictures.com

Columbia Pictures started its own UK theatrical arm in 1929, operating under the name Columbia Pictures Corporation Limited. from 1971 until the end of 1987, Columbia's international theatrical distribution operations were a joint venture with Warner Bros. named Columbia-Warner Distributors, and in some countries, this joint venture also distributed films from other companies like with EMI Films and Cannon Films in the UK under the names of Columbia-EMI-Warner Distributors in 1978 and later Columbia-Cannon-Warner Distributors in 1986. When its theatrical distribution joint venture ended in 1988, the company was later renamed Filmbank Distributors as a non-theatrical licensor. Columbia Pictures Corporation Limited remained the sole distributor in the UK.

In Australia, Columbia Pictures Pty Ltd operated the theatrical release from 1935. which from 1975 to 1996, 20th Century-Fox and Columbia Pictures formed an alliance that they would distribute films for the Australian market, initially going under the name Fox Columbia Film Distributors, before Hoyts came to the venture, and it was renamed first to Hoyts Fox Columbia TriStar Films, then Fox Columbia TriStar Films. Sony Pictures Releasing Pty Limited took over distribution operations directly.

Logo used from 2005 to 2026

On February 6, 2014, Columbia TriStar Warner Filmes de Portugal Ltda., a joint venture with Warner Bros. which distributed films from both companies in Portugal, announced that they will close their offices on March 31. Sony Pictures' films are distributed in Portugal by Big Picture Films since then, while NOS Audiovisuais took over the distribution duties for Warner Bros. films in the country.

From June 2014 until February 2020, Sony Pictures' Philippine releasing arm under the name of Columbia Pictures Philippines distributed films by United International Pictures, Inc.'s partner studios, Paramount Pictures and Universal Pictures (including films by Metro-Goldwyn-Mayer), after UIP ended its nine-year distribution agreement with the studio's local distributor Solar Entertainment and their Solar Films subsidiary. The Philippine distribution to films made by Universal lasted up until January 2020, when distribution reverted to Warner Bros. (UIP's former local distributor from the 1990s to 2000) in October 2021 while most Focus Features titles are instead released through a start-up online distribution company, UPSTREAM (which later reverted to Warner Bros. after its closure). Paramount later renewed their distribution agreements with Sony in October 2021.

The theatrical distribution of Sony Pictures' films in Italy was handled by Warner Bros. from 2011 to 2023. One notable example of this is Call Me By Your Name, where Warner Bros. handled Italian theatrical distribution (although the Sony label is still being used) while home video distribution went through Sony itself. In 2023, Eagle Pictures, which was already distributing Sony's films on home video in the country, took over their theatrical distribution as well.

Sony Pictures and Walt Disney Studios formed a film distribution joint venture in Southeast Asia in 1997. By December 2006, 14 joint distribution ventures between Sony Pictures Releasing International and Walt Disney Studios Motion Pictures were formed and exist in countries including Brazil, Mexico, Singapore, Thailand and the Philippines. In January 2007, their 15th such partnership began operations in Russia and CIS. In February 2017, Sony starting leaving the Southeast Asia venture with the Philippines. In August 2017, Sony terminated the joint venture agreement for their own operations. On January 31, 2019, in anticipation of Disney's then-pending acquisition of most 21st Century Fox assets (including 20th Century Fox), it was agreed that Disney would sell its stake in the Mexican joint venture named Walt Disney Studios Sony Pictures Releasing de México to Sony Pictures Releasing. As part of the global economic fluctuations caused by the Disney's acquisition, Sony Pictures Production and Release LLC and Disney Studios LLC parted amicably signing a formal demerger on 21 January 2020. The contract would allow Sony Pictures Releasing to operate autonomously.

On June 27, 2025, Sony Pictures Releasing and Metro-Goldwyn-Mayer formed a multi-year deal in which Sony would handle the international theatrical distribution of their newer titles, following the expiration of MGM's international deal with Warner Bros. Pictures. This deal would reunite Sony with MGM for the first time since 2020. It does not affect the physical media releases, as MGM Home Entertainment will still have its titles distributed on physical media by Alliance Entertainment in North America since 2026.

In Argentina and Poland, United International Pictures handled theatrical distribution of films released by Sony Pictures until 2026.

In the Netherlands, Universal Pictures currently handles theatrical distribution of films released by Sony Pictures since 2013.

In the Nordic countries, Columbia TriStar Films (now known as Sony Pictures Releasing) formerly handled Sweden theatrical distribution of films released by 20th Century Fox from 1992 to 1997. Sony Pictures had strong partnership with Nordisk Film, which ended in early 2007. Sony Pictures later struck a deal with local partner AB Svensk Filmindustri, which included theatrical and home entertainment distribution.

In South Africa, Ster-Kinekor handles theatrical and home video distribution of films released by Sony Pictures.

In Greece, Sony Pictures and Feelgood Entertainment has long standing partnership for theatrical distribution. In addition, the Middle East is handled by Empire International. For Israel, they struck a deal with Forum Films.

== Filmography ==
=== Highest-grossing films ===
† indicates films playing in theaters around the world in the week commencing 16 November 2026.

Highest-grossing films in North America
Rank	Title	Year	Domestic gross	Studio
1	Spider-Man: Brand New Day	2026	$958,723,108	Columbia/Marvel
2	Spider-Man: No Way Home	2021	$814,108,407	Columbia/Marvel
3	Spider-Man	2002	$407,022,860	Columbia
4	Jumanji: Welcome to the Jungle	2017	$404,540,171	Columbia
5	Spider-Man: Far From Home	2019	$390,532,085	Columbia/ Marvel
6	Spider-Man: Across the Spider-Verse	2023	$381,593,754	Columbia
7	Spider-Man 2	2004	$373,585,825	Columbia
8	Project Hail Mary	2026	$343,403,886	Amazon MGM/Sony (Note: as Sony Pictures Releasing International)
9	Spider-Man 3	2007	$336,530,303	Columbia
10	Spider-Man: Homecoming	2017	$334,201,140	Columbia/ Marvel
11	Jumanji: The Next Level	2019	$320,314,960	Columbia
12	Skyfall	2012	$304,360,277	Columbia/MGM
13	The Amazing Spider-Man	2012	$262,030,663	Columbia
14	Men in Black	1997	$250,690,539	Columbia
15	Ghostbusters	1984	$229,242,989	Columbia
16	Hancock	2008	$227,946,274	Columbia
17	The Da Vinci Code	2006	$217,536,138	Columbia
18	Venom: Let There Be Carnage	2021	$213,550,366	Columbia
19	Venom	2018	$213,515,506	Columbia
20	Terminator 2: Judgment Day	1991	$204,843,345	TriStar
21	Bad Boys for Life	2020	$204,292,401	Columbia
22	The Amazing Spider-Man 2	2014	$202,853,933	Columbia
23	Spectre	2015	$200,074,609	Columbia/MGM
24	Bad Boys: Ride or Die	2024	$193,410,058	Columbia
25	22 Jump Street	2014	$191,719,337	Columbia

Highest-grossing films worldwide
Rank	Title	Year	Worldwide gross	Studio(s)
1	Spider-Man: Brand New Day	2026	$2,519,458,878	Columbia/Marvel
2	Spider-Man: No Way Home	2021	$1,916,306,995	Columbia/Marvel
3	Spider-Man: Far From Home	2019	$1,132,679,685	Columbia/Marvel
4	Skyfall	2012	$1,108,594,137	Columbia/MGM
5	Jumanji: Welcome to the Jungle	2017	$962,126,927	Columbia
6	Spider-Man 3	2007	$894,983,373	Columbia
7	Spectre	2015	$880,674,609	Columbia/MGM
8	Spider-Man: Homecoming	2017	$880,166,924	Columbia/Marvel
9	Venom	2018	$855,013,954	Columbia
10	Spider-Man	2002	$825,025,036	Columbia
11	The Da Vinci Code	2006	$801,000,000	Columbia
12	Jumanji: The Next Level	2019	$800,059,707	Columbia
13	Demon Slayer: Kimetsu no Yaiba the Movie: Infinity Castle	2025	$795,346,072	Aniplex/Crunchyroll
14	2012	2009	$791,217,826	Columbia
15	Spider-Man 2	2004	$788,976,453	Columbia
16	The Amazing Spider-Man	2012	$757,930,663	Columbia
17	The Amazing Spider-Man 2	2014	$708,982,323	Columbia
18	Spider-Man: Across the Spider-Verse	2023	$690,897,910	Columbia
19	Project Hail Mary	2026	$684,234,722	Amazon MGM/Sony
20	Hancock	2008	$624,386,746	Columbia
21	Men in Black 3	2012	$624,026,776	Columbia
22	Casino Royale	2006	$606,099,584	Columbia/MGM
23	Quantum of Solace	2008	$589,580,482	Columbia/MGM
24	Men in Black	1997	$589,390,539	Columbia
25	The Smurfs	2011	$563,749,323	Columbia
