= Kōtarō Isaka =

Japanese author of mystery fiction (born 1971)

- Born: 25 May 1971 (age 54) Matsudo, Japan
- Occupation: Author
- Period: 2000–present
- Genre: Mystery; Crime fiction; Known for: Bullet Train (Maria Beetle)

Kōtarō Isaka (伊坂 幸太郎, Isaka Kōtarō; born 25 May 1971) is a Japanese author of mystery fiction, best known for his Hitman novel/manga series, including Maoh: Juvenile Remix (2007–2009), the first of which, 3 Assassins (2004, Japanese; 2022, English), was adapted as a Japanese feature film, Grasshopper (2015), and the second of which, Maria Beetle (2010, Japanese; 2021, English), was adapted as an American feature film, Bullet Train (2022).

== Life and career ==
Isaka was born in Matsudo City, Chiba Prefecture, Japan. After graduating from the law faculty of Tohoku University, he worked as a system engineer. In 2000, Isaka won the Shincho Mystery Club Prize for his debut novel Ōdyubon no Inori, after which he became a full-time writer.

In 2002, Isaka's novel Lush Life gained much critical acclaim, but it was his Naoki Prize-nominated work Jūryoku Piero (2003) that brought him popular success. His following work Ahiru to Kamo no Koin Rokkā won the 25th Yoshikawa Eiji Prize for New Writers.

Jūryoku Piero (2003), Children (2004), Grasshopper (2004), Shinigami no Seido (2005) and Sabaku (2006) were all nominated for the Naoki Prize.

Isaka was the only author in Japan to be nominated for the Hon'ya Taishō in each of the award's first four years, finally winning in 2008 with Remote Control (original Japanese title: Golden Slumber). The same work also won the 21st Yamamoto Shūgorō Prize.

Isaka's books have sold millions of copies around the world.

His 2010 novel Maria Beetle was adapted as the 2022 major film Bullet Train starring Brad Pitt.

A film adaptation of his 2019 book Seesaw Monster (Shisō Monsutā, シーソーモンスター), starring Anne Hathaway and Salma Hayek (who are also producers), is currently in production and will be distributed by Netflix.

== Works available in English ==
Novels

- Remote Control (original Japanese title: Golden Slumber), trans. Stephen Snyder (Kodansha USA, 2011) ISBN 978-4770031082
- Hitman series
  - 3 Assassins (original Japanese title: Grasshopper), trans. Sam Malissa (Japan 2004; Harvill Secker and The Overlook Press, 2022) ISBN 978-1787303201 ISBN 978-1419763854
  - Bullet Train (original Japanese title: Maria Beetle), trans. Sam Malissa (Japan 2010; Harvill Secker and The Overlook Press, 2021) ISBN 978-1787302587 ISBN 978-1419756337
  - The Mantis (original Japanese title: AX), trans. Sam Malissa (Japan 2017; Harvill Secker and The Overlook Press, 2023) ISBN 978-1419769474
  - Hotel Lucky Seven (original Japanese title: 777 トリプルセブン) (Japan 2023; Harvill Secker and The Overlook Press, 2024) ISBN 978-1787304741

Manga

- Hitman series
  - Maoh: Juvenile Remix (Japan 2007–2009; Viz Media, 2010–2012)
  - Waltz (Japan 2009–2012; Viz Media 2010–2012)

Short stories

- The Precision of the Agent of Death (original Japanese title: Shinigami no Seido), trans. Beth Cary
  - Ellery Queen's Mystery Magazine, July 2006
  - Passport to Crime: Finest Mystery Stories from International Crime Writers, Running Press, 2007 ISBN 978-0786719167
- The Bookmobile (original Japanese title: Bukkumobīru), trans. Michael Emmerich (Granta online, 4 November 2020)

== Awards ==
- 2022 – Strand Critics Awards for Best Debut Novel: Bullet Train (original Japanese title: Maria Beetle)

Japanese awards

- 1996 – 13th Suntory Mystery Prize honorable mention: Akutō Tachi ga Me ni Shimiru (Later revised as Yōkina Gyangu ga Chikyū o Mawasu)
- 2000 – 5th Shincho Mystery Club Prize: Ōdyubon no Inori
- 2004 – 25th Yoshikawa Eiji Prize for New Writers: Ahiru to Kamo no Koin Rokkā
- 2004 – 57th Mystery Writers of Japan Award for Best Short Story: Shinigami no Seido
- 2008 – 5th Japan Booksellers' Award (Hon'ya Taishō): Remote Control (original Japanese title: Golden Slumber)
- 2008 – 21st Yamamoto Shūgorō Prize: Remote Control (original Japanese title: Golden Slumber)
- 2020 – 33rd Shibata Renzaburō Award: Gyaku Sokuratesu

French awards

- 2012 – Prix Masterton (fr): Ōdyubon no Inori (French title: La Prière d'Audubon)
- 2012 – Prix Zoom Japon: Ōdyubon no Inori (French title: La Prière d'Audubon)

== Bibliography ==
=== Hitman series ===
3 Assassins, the first novel in Isaka's Hitman series.

- Gurasuhoppā (Grasshopper; 3 Assassins) (グラスホッパー), 2004 novel
- Maō (魔王), 2005 short story collection
- Maoh: Juvenile Remix (魔王 ~JUVENILE REMIX~), 2007–2009 manga series
- Waltz (ワルツ), 2009–2012 manga series
- Maria Bītoru (Maria Beetle; Bullet Train) (マリアビートル), 2010 novel
- Akkusu (The Mantis) (アックス), 2017 short story collection

=== Other novels ===
- Ōdyubon no Inori (オーデュボンの祈り), 2000 (French translation: La Prière d'Audubon, Philippe Picquier Publishing, 2011)
- Rasshu Raifu (Lush Life) (ラッシュライフ), 2002
- Yōkina Gyangu ga Chikyū o Mawasu (陽気なギャングが地球を回す), 2003
- Jūryoku Piero (重力ピエロ), 2003 (French translation: Pierrot-la-gravité, Philippe Picquier Publishing, 2012)
- Ahiru to Kamo no Koin Rokkā (アヒルと鴨のコインロッカー), 2003
- Sabaku (砂漠), 2005
- Yōkina Gyangu no Nichijō to Shūgeki (陽気なギャングの日常と襲撃), 2006
- Gōruden Surambā (Golden Slumber) (ゴールデンスランバー), 2007
- Modan Taimusu (Modern Times) (モダンタイムス), 2008
- Aru Kingu (あるキング), 2009
- Esu Ō Esu no Saru (SOSの猿), 2009
- Ō! Fāzā (Oh! Father) (オー! ファーザー), 2010
- Yoru no Kuni no Kūpā (夜の国のクーパー), 2012
- Gasorin Seikatsu (ガソリン生活), 2013
- Shinigami no Furyoku (死神の浮力), 2013
- Kyaputen Sandāboruto (Captain Thunderbolt) (キャプテンサンダーボルト), co-authored with Kazushige Abe, 2014
- Kasei ni Sumu Tsumorikai ? (火星に住むつもりかい？), 2015
- Yōkina Gyangu wa Mittsu Kazoero (陽気なギャングは三つ数えろ), 2015
- Sabumarin (Submarine) (サブマリン), 2016
- Howaito Rabitto (White Rabbit) (ホワイトラビット), 2017
- Fūga wa Yūga (フーガはユーガ), 2018
- Kujiraatama no Ōsama (クジラアタマの王様), 2019
- Peppāzu Gōsuto (Pepper's Ghost) (ペッパーズ・ゴースト), 2021
- Sayonara Jabberwock (Farewell to Jabberwock) (さよならジャバウォック), 2025

=== Short story collections ===
- Chirudoren (Children) (チルドレン), 2004
- Shinigami no Seido (死神の精度), 2005 (French translation: La Mort avec précision, Philippe Picquier Publishing, 2015)
- Shūmatsu no Fūru (終末のフール), 2006
- Fisshu Sutōrī (Fish Story) (フィッシュストーリー), 2007
- Baibai, Burakkubādo (Bye Bye, Blackbird) (バイバイ、ブラックバード), 2010
- Pīkē (PK), 2012
- Nokori Zembu Bakēshon (残り全部バケーション), 2012
- Kubioriotoko no tameno Kyōsōkyoku (首折り男のための協奏曲), 2014
- Aine Kuraine Nahatomujīku (Eine kleine Nachtmusik) (アイネクライネナハトムジーク), 2014
- Jairosukōpu (Gyroscope) (ジャイロスコープ), 2015
- Shisō Monsutā (Seesaw Monster) (シーソーモンスター), 2019
- Gyaku Sokuratesu (逆ソクラテス), 2020
- Maikuro Supai Ansanburu (Micro Spy Ensemble) (マイクロスパイ・アンサンブル), 2022

== Film adaptations ==
- A Cheerful Gang Turns the Earth (2006) (Yōkina Gyangu ga Chikyū o Mawasu)
- Children (2006)
- The Foreign Duck, the Native Duck and God in a Coin Locker (2007) (Ahiru to Kamo no Koin Rokkā)
- Sweet Rain (2008) (Shinigami no Seido)
- Fish Story (2009)
- Gravity's Clowns (2009) (Jūryoku Piero)
- Lush Life (2009)
- Golden Slumber (2010)
- Chips (2012) (Potechi)
- Oh! Father (2014)
- Grasshopper (2015)
- Golden Slumber (2018) (Korean movie)
- Little Nights, Little Love (2019) (Eine kleine Nachtmusik)
- Bullet Train (2022) (Maria beetle)
- Untitled Seesaw Monster film adaptation (TBA)

== Television adaptations ==
- Goodbye Earth (2024) (Shūmatsu no Fūru)

== Manga adaptations ==
- Grasshopper (3 Assassins)
- Eine kleine Nachtmusik
