= Namino =

Namino may refer to:

- Namino, Kumamoto, a former village in Aso District, Kumamoto Prefecture, Japan
- Namino Station, a railway station in Aso, Kumamoto, Japan

== People with the surname ==
- Kuriko Namino (波乃 久里子, born 1945), Japanese actress
