= Takimizu Station =

Railway station in Aso, Kumamoto Prefecture, Japan

Takimizu Station 滝水駅
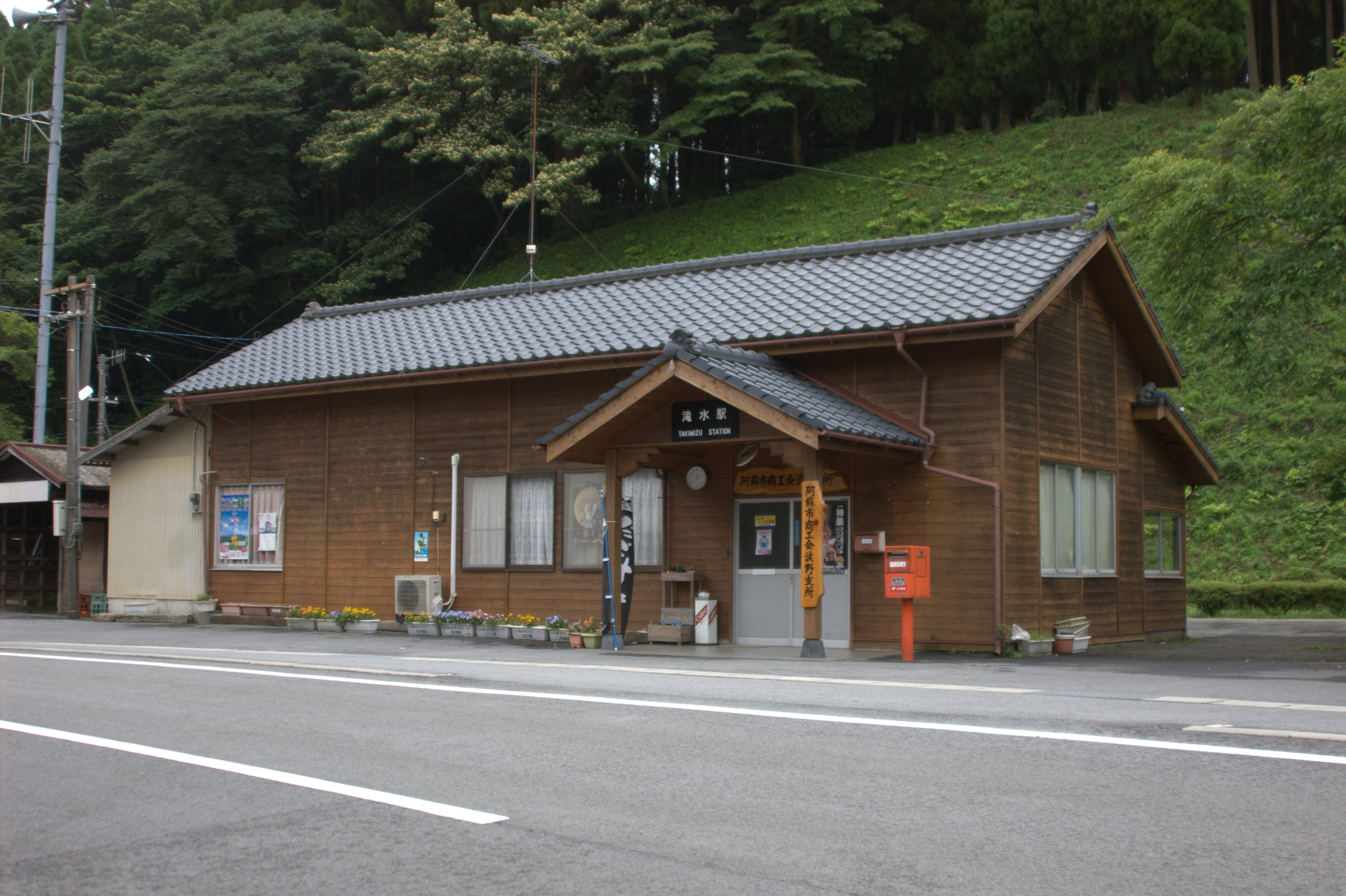
- Takimizu Station in 2009

General information
- Location: Namino Oaza Takimizu, Aso-shi, Kumamoto-ken 869-2804; Japan
- Coordinates: 32°56′00″N 131°14′34″E
- Operator: JR Kyushu
- Line: ■ Hōhi Main Line
- Distance: 69.0 km from Kumamoto
- Platforms: 1 side platform
- Tracks: 1

Construction
- Structure type: At grade

Other information
- Status: Unstaffed
- Website: Official website

History
- Opened: 2 December 1928

Services
Preceding station	JR Kyushu	Following station
Namino towards Kumamoto	Hōhi Main Line	Bungo-Ogi towards Ōita
Location
- Location within Kumamoto Prefecture Location within Japan

Takimizu Station (滝水駅, Takimizu-eki) is a passenger railway station located in the city of Aso, Kumamoto, Japan. It Is operated by JR Kyushu.

== Lines ==
The station is served by the Hōhi Main Line and is located 69.0 km from the starting point of the line at Kumamoto.

== Layout ==
The station consists of a side platform serving a single track at grade. The station building is wooden structure of traditional Japanese design with a tiled roof. It is, however, unstaffed, and the main part of the building is now used by the local chamber of commerce and thus not accessible to passengers. Instead, the platform is accessed through a passage beside the building. On the platform facing the track, an annex of the station building has been opened up as a waiting room.

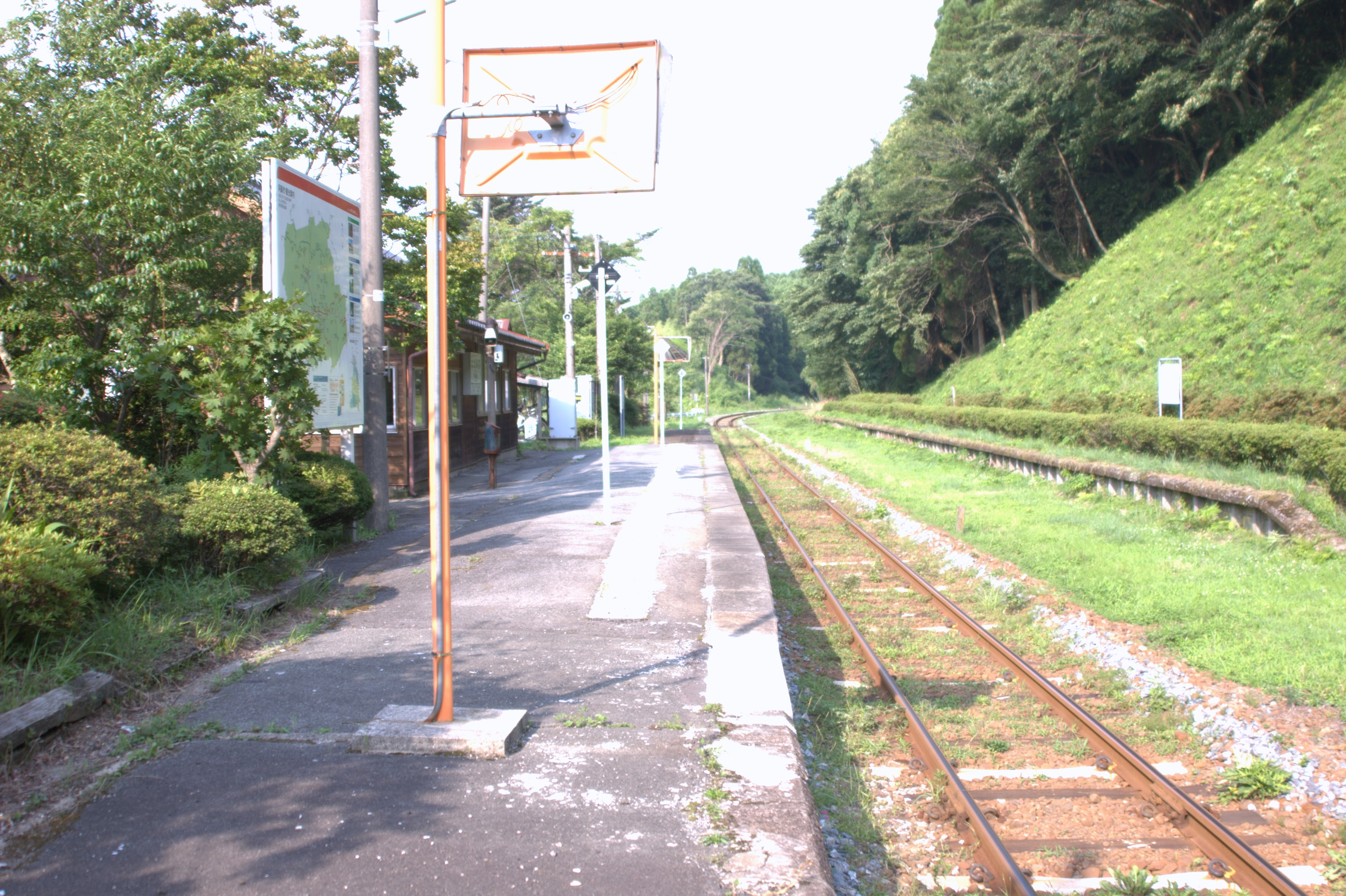
A view of the platform and track.

== History ==
Japanese Government Railways (JGR) had opened the Inukai Light Rail Line (犬飼軽便線) (later Inukai Line) from Ōita to Nakahanda on 1 April 1914. The track was extended westwards in phases, with Tamarai being established as its western terminus on 30 November 1925. Further to the west, JGR had, on 21 June 1914 opened the Miyaji Light Rail Line (宮地軽便線) (later the Miyaji Line) from Kumamoto east to Higo-Ōzu. This track was also extended in phases, reaching Miyaji as its eastern terminus on 25 January 1918. On 2 December 1928, Miyaji and Tamarai were linked up, with Takimizu opening on the same day as one of several intermediate stations along the new track. Through-traffic was established between Kumamoto and Ōita. The Inukai and Miyaji lines were merged and the entire stretch redesignated as the Hōhi Main Line. With the privatization of Japanese National Railways (JNR), the successor of JGR, on 1 April 1987, Takimizu came under the control of JR Kyushu.

On 17 September 2017, Typhoon Talim (Typhoon 18) damaged the Hōhi Main Line at several locations. Services between Aso and Nakahanda, including Takimizu, were suspended and replaced by bus services. Rail service from Aso through this station to Miemachi was restored by 22 September 2017 Normal rail services between Aso and Ōita were restored by 2 October 2017.

== Surrounding area ==
- Aso City Hall Namino Branch
- Namino Post office

== See also ==
- List of railway stations in Japan
