= Aso, Kumamoto =

Aso 阿蘇市
- City
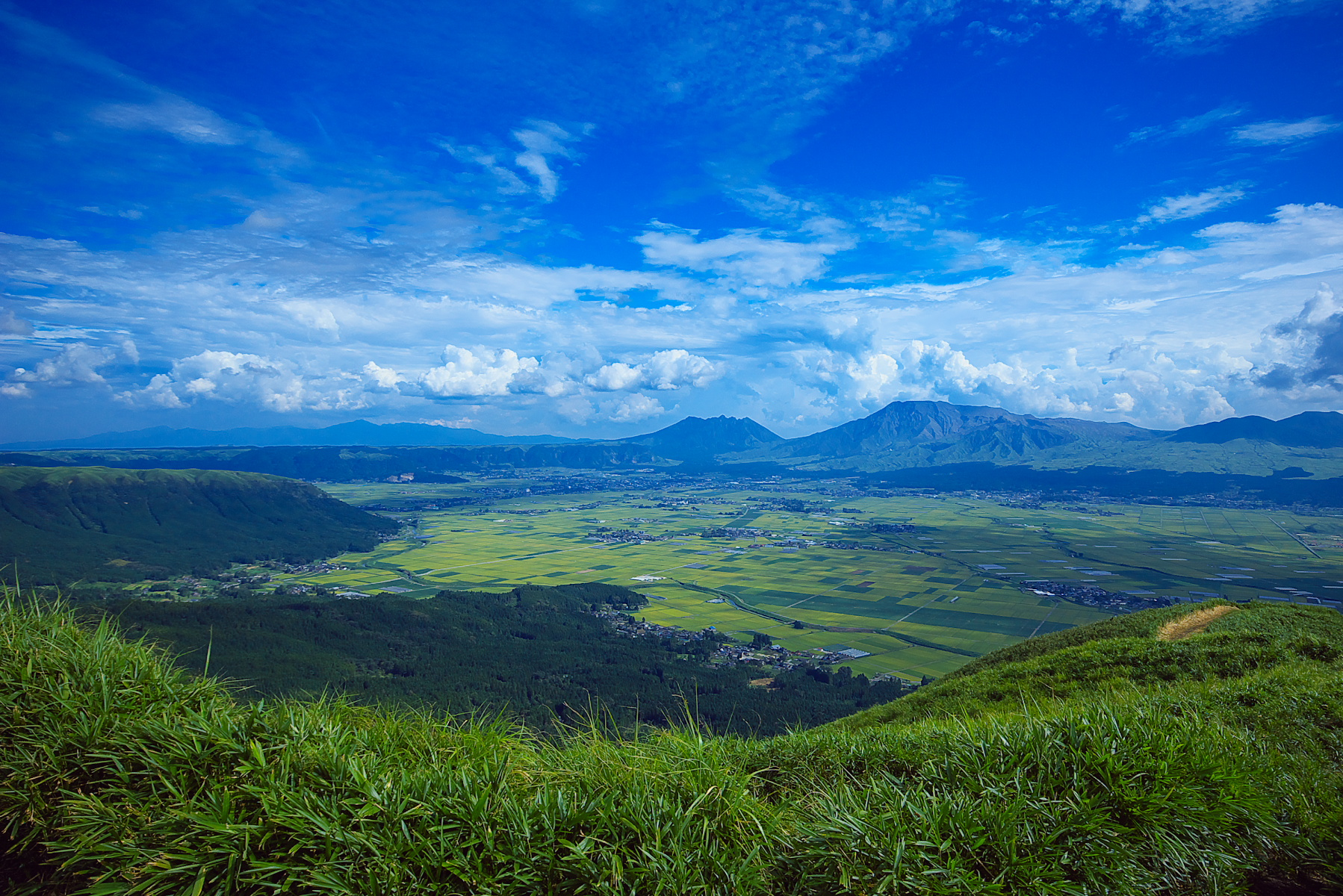
- Aso City with Mount Aso

- Flag Emblem
- Interactive map of Aso
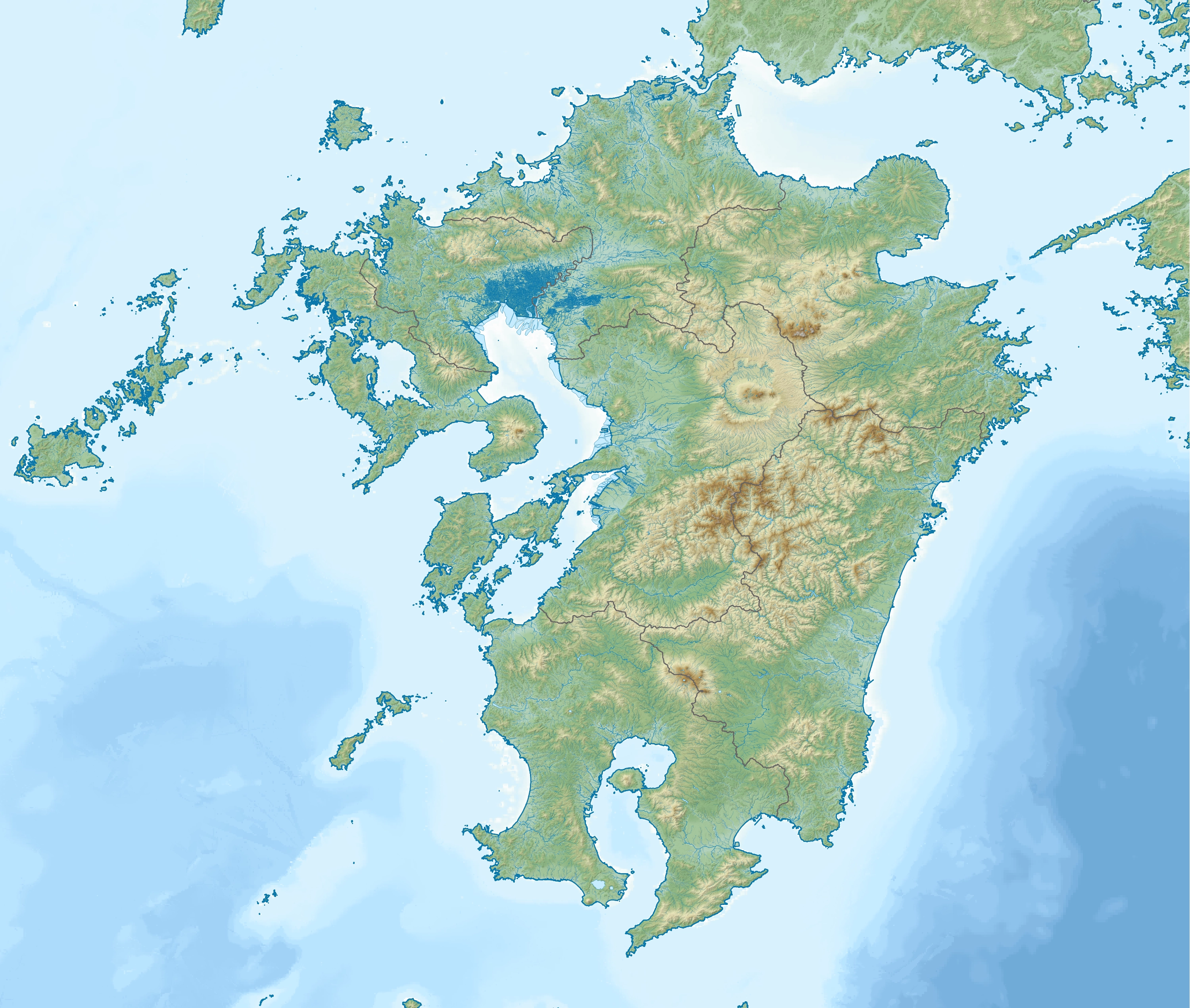
- Location in Japan Aso (Kyushu) Aso (Japan)
- Coordinates: 32°57′07″N 131°07′17″E
- Country: Japan
- Region: Kyushu
- Prefecture: Kumamoto
- City established: February 11, 2005

Government
  - Mayor: Yoshioki Sato (since March 2005)

Area
  - Total: 376.30 km^{2} (145.29 sq mi)

Population (July 31, 2024)
  - Total: 24,240
  - Density: 64.42/km^{2} (166.8/sq mi)
- Time zone: UTC+09:00 (JST)
- City hall address: Ichinomiya Miyaji 504-1, Aso-shi, Kumamoto-ken 869-2695
- Climate: Cfa
- Website: Official website
- Symbols
- Bird: Green pheasant
- Flower: Gentiana scabra
- Tree: Azalea

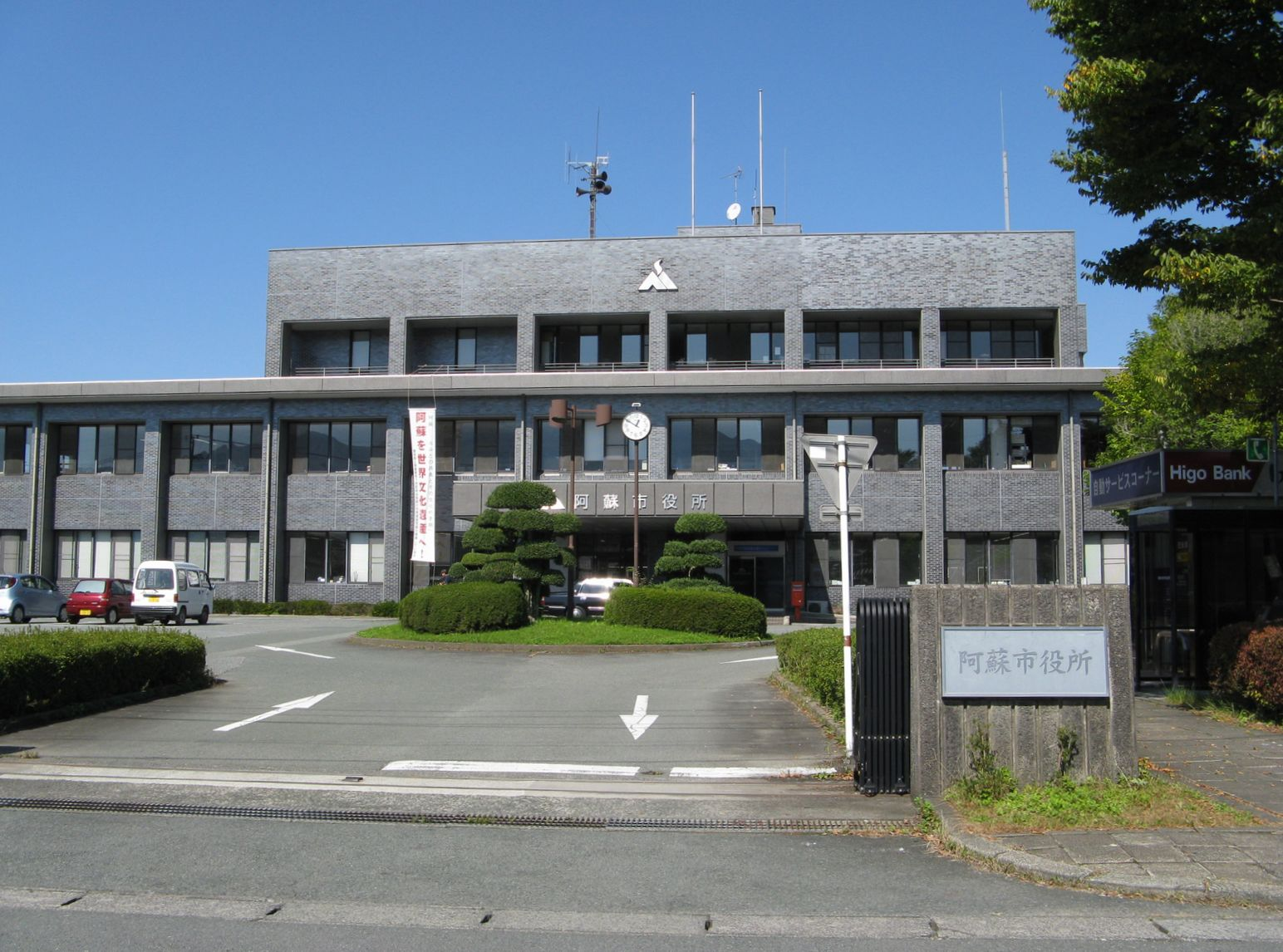
Aso City Hall

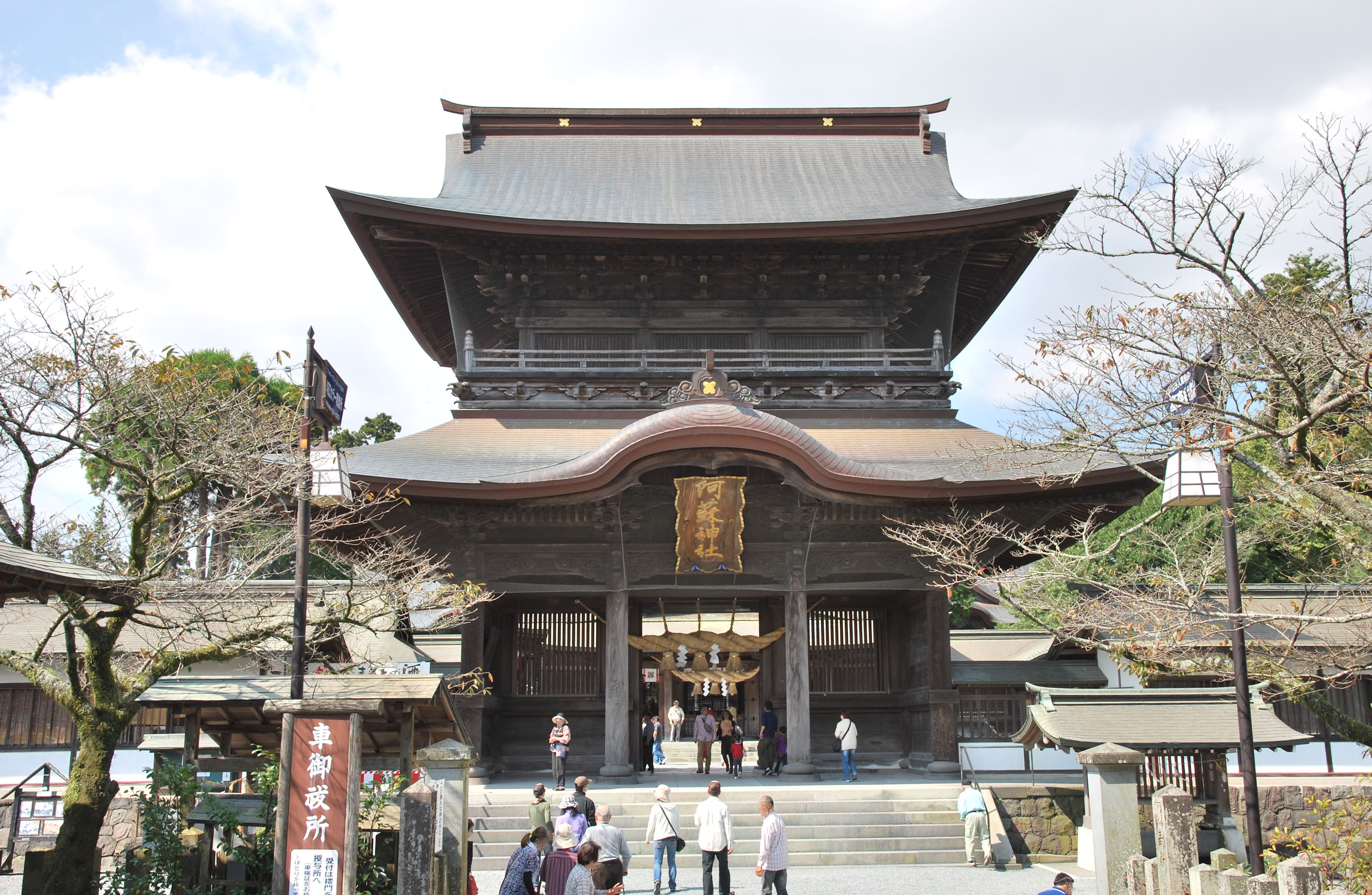
Aso Jinja

Aso (阿蘇市, Aso-shi; Japanese pronunciation: [ä́.sò̞, ä̀.só̞.ɕì]) is a city located in Kumamoto Prefecture, Japan. As of 31 July 2024, the city had an estimated population of 24,240 in 11741 households, and a population density of 64 persons per km^{2}. The total area of the city is 376.30 km^{2} (145.29 sq mi).

== Geography ==
Aso is located in the Kyushu Mountains, about 50 kilometers from Kumamoto City in the northeastern part of Kumamoto Prefecture, and borders Oita Prefecture in the eastern and northwestern parts of the city. Most of the former Aso Town and former Ichinomiya Town areas (the former Hano Village is outside the caldera) are included in the caldera basin formed by Mount Aso. (Five Peaks of Mount Aso) The source of the Kikuchi River is located in the city.

=== Surrounding municipalities ===
Kumamoto Prefecture

- Kikuchi
- Minamiaso
- Oguni
- Ōzu
- Takamori
- Ubuyama

Oita Prefecture

- Hita
- Taketa

=== Climate ===
Aso has a humid subtropical climate (Köppen climate classification Cfa) with hot, humid summers and cool winters. There is significant precipitation throughout the year, especially during June and July. The average annual temperature in Aso is 13.2 °C (55.8 °F). The average annual rainfall is 3,009.6 mm (118.49 in) with June as the wettest month. The temperatures are highest on average in August, at around 24.2 °C (75.6 °F), and lowest in January, at around 2.0 °C (35.6 °F). The highest temperature ever recorded in Aso was 35.8 °C (96.4 °F) on 2 August 2026; the coldest temperature ever recorded was −14.8 °C (5.4 °F) on 25 January 1998.

Climate data for Aso (1991−2020 normals, extremes 1978−present)
Month	Jan	Feb	Mar	Apr	May	Jun	Jul	Aug	Sep	Oct	Nov	Dec	Year
Record high °C (°F)	17.4 (63.3)	21.5 (70.7)	24.0 (75.2)	27.3 (81.1)	30.6 (87.1)	32.8 (91.0)	34.8 (94.6)	35.8 (96.4)	33.2 (91.8)	31.1 (88.0)	24.7 (76.5)	20.2 (68.4)	35.8 (96.4)
Mean daily maximum °C (°F)	7.1 (44.8)	8.9 (48.0)	12.7 (54.9)	18.0 (64.4)	22.5 (72.5)	24.6 (76.3)	28.2 (82.8)	29.3 (84.7)	26.1 (79.0)	21.0 (69.8)	15.4 (59.7)	9.5 (49.1)	18.6 (65.5)
Daily mean °C (°F)	2.0 (35.6)	3.4 (38.1)	6.9 (44.4)	11.9 (53.4)	16.7 (62.1)	20.2 (68.4)	23.8 (74.8)	24.2 (75.6)	20.8 (69.4)	15.1 (59.2)	9.2 (48.6)	3.8 (38.8)	13.2 (55.7)
Mean daily minimum °C (°F)	−2.7 (27.1)	−1.8 (28.8)	1.2 (34.2)	5.7 (42.3)	11.0 (51.8)	16.3 (61.3)	20.5 (68.9)	20.5 (68.9)	16.5 (61.7)	9.7 (49.5)	3.6 (38.5)	−1.4 (29.5)	8.3 (46.9)
Record low °C (°F)	−14.8 (5.4)	−12.5 (9.5)	−8.5 (16.7)	−5.2 (22.6)	0.6 (33.1)	6.0 (42.8)	10.7 (51.3)	12.5 (54.5)	4.8 (40.6)	−1.9 (28.6)	−5.4 (22.3)	−10.2 (13.6)	−14.8 (5.4)
Average precipitation mm (inches)	92.7 (3.65)	134.8 (5.31)	197.2 (7.76)	219.2 (8.63)	261.3 (10.29)	667.9 (26.30)	582.6 (22.94)	291.0 (11.46)	247.8 (9.76)	118.7 (4.67)	109.7 (4.32)	86.9 (3.42)	3,009.6 (118.49)
Average precipitation days (≥ 1.0 mm)	8.3	9.5	12.3	11.4	11.3	16.4	16.4	13.2	11.6	8.2	8.5	8.2	135.3
Mean monthly sunshine hours	106.6	119.7	152.2	172.4	178.4	115.7	139.6	160.4	136.2	158.8	132.7	117.8	1,697.1
Source: Japan Meteorological Agency

=== Demographics ===
Per Japanese census data, the population of Aso in 2020 is 24,930 people.

Historical population

Year	Pop.	±%
1920	27,085	—
1925	28,407	+4.9%
1930	30,029	+5.7%
1935	31,029	+3.3%
1940	30,451	−1.9%
1945	39,645	+30.2%
1950	40,001	+0.9%
1955	41,617	+4.0%
1960	40,385	−3.0%
1965	38,055	−5.8%
1970	35,878	−5.7%

Year	Pop.	±%
1975	34,607	−3.5%
1980	34,004	−1.7%
1985	33,504	−1.5%
1990	33,018	−1.5%
1995	31,364	−5.0%
2000	30,457	−2.9%
2005	29,636	−2.7%
2010	28,452	−4.0%
2015	27,018	−5.0%
2020	24,930	−7.7%

Aso population statistics

== History ==
The area of Aso was part of ancient Higo Province. The name appears in the Nihon Shoki as "Aso-no-kuni" and was ruled by the Aso clan from ancient times. During the Edo Period it was part of the holdings of Kumamoto Domain. After the Meiji restoration, the villages of Uchimaki, Kurokawa, Eisui, Ogaishi, Yamada, Miyaji, Furushiro, Nakadori, Sakanashi and Namino were established in Aso District with the creation of the modern municipalities system on April 1, 1889. Miyaji was raised to town status on August 27, 1895, followed by Uchimaki on April 1, 1906. On April 1, 1954 Uchimaki merged with the villages of Kurokawa, Eisui, Ogaishi, and Village and was renamed Aso Town. Miyaji likewise merged with the villages of Furushiro, Nakadori, and Village to become the town of Ichinomiya. On February 11, 2005, Aso Town, Ichinomiya Town, and village of Namino are merged to become the city of Aso.

== Government ==
Aso has a mayor-council form of government with a directly elected mayor and a unicameral city council of 18 members. Aso contributes one member to the Kumamoto Prefectural Assembly. In terms of national politics, the city is part of the Kumamoto 3rd district of the lower house of the Diet of Japan.

== Economy ==
Aso has an economy based primarily on agriculture, including livestock raising.

== Education ==
Aso has five public elementary schools and three public junior high schools operated by the city government and one public high school operated by the Kumamoto Prefectural Board of Education.

== Transportation ==
=== Railways ===
JR Kyushu - Hōhi Main Line

■ Akamizu - Ichinokawa - Uchinomaki - Aso - Ikoi-no-Mura - Miyaji - Namino - Takimizu

=== Highways ===
- National Route 57
- National Route 212
- National Route 265

== Local attractions ==
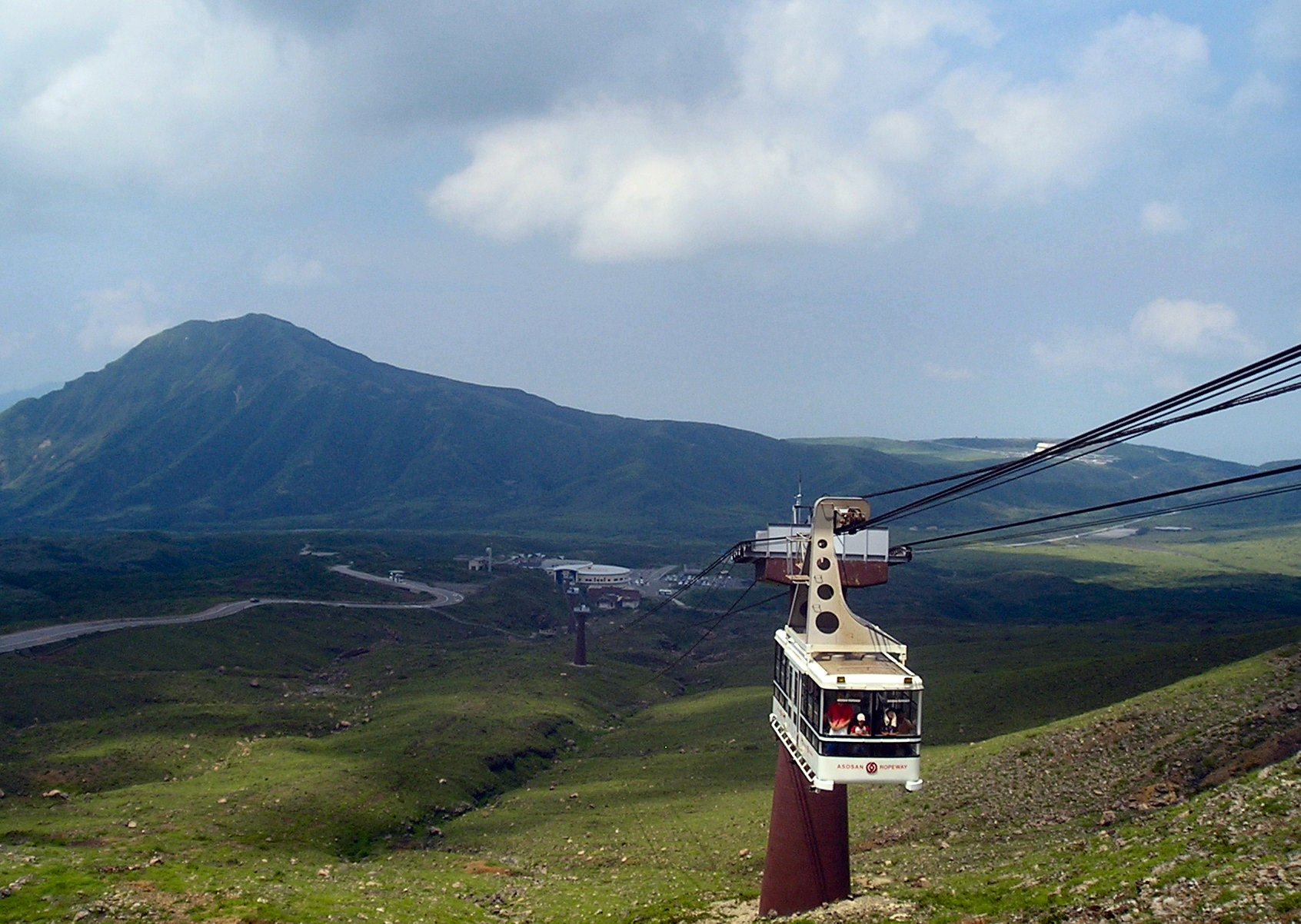
Mount Aso and Cable car

- Aso Geopark
- Aso Kujū National Park
  - Aso Volcano Museum
  - Mount Aso
  - Mount Aso Ropeway
- Aso Shrine

== Notable people from Aso ==
- Nichidatsu Fujii, Buddhist monk
- Toshikatsu Matsuoka, politician
