= Aso Volcano Museum =

Japanese museum near Mount Aso

- 阿蘇火山博物館
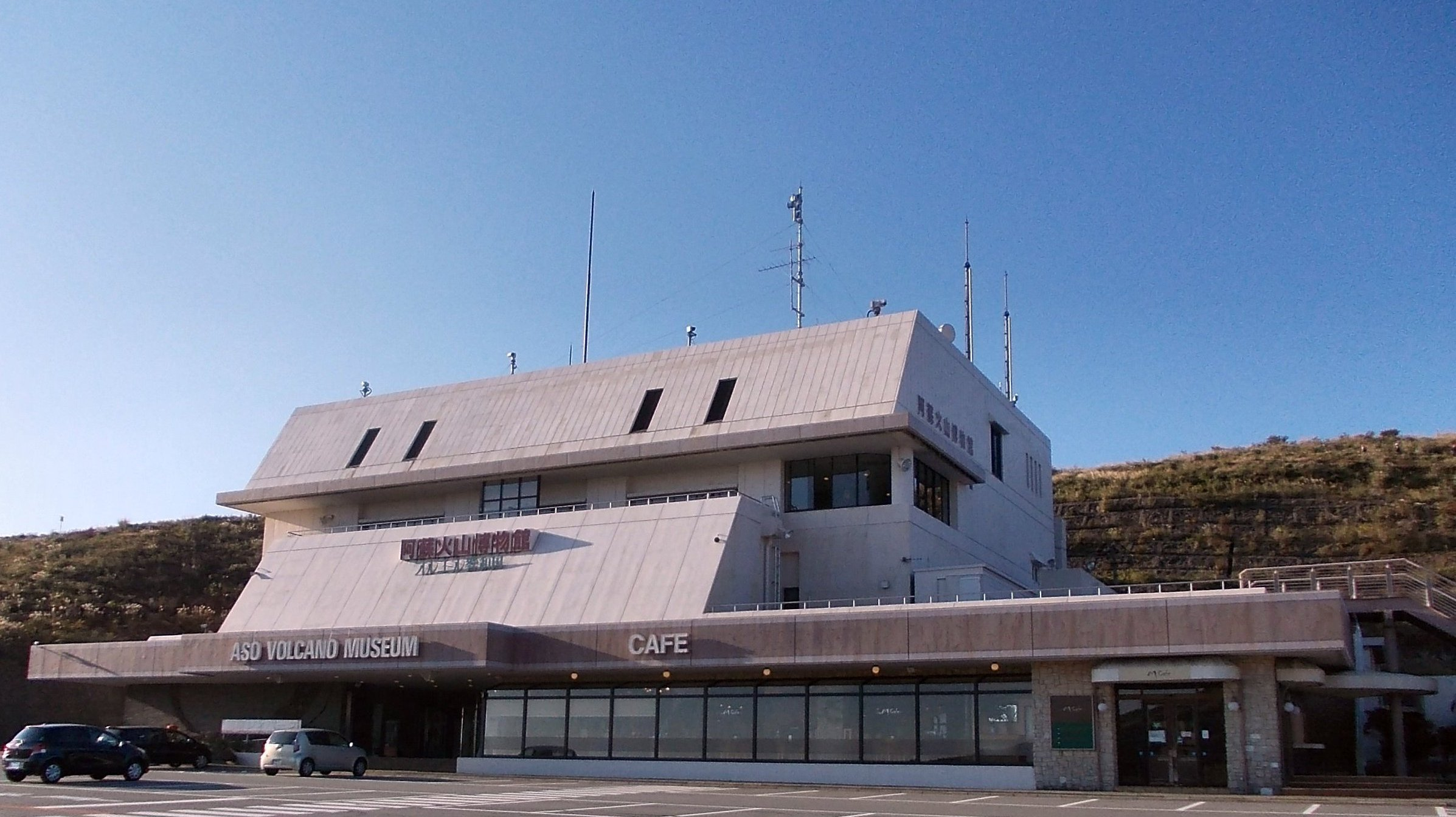
- Aso Volcano Museum

- Location within Kumamoto Prefecture Location within Japan
- Location: Aso, Kumamoto, Japan
- Coordinates: 32°53′7″N 131°3′7″E
- Type: geology museum
- Website: www.asomuse.jp

The Aso Volcano Museum (阿蘇火山博物館, Aso-kazan Hakubutsukan) is a geology museum located Kusasenri, of the city of Aso, Kumamoto Prefecture. It is near Mount Aso, the largest active volcano in Japan.

Visitors can view a live video feed from inside Nakadake crater.

== History ==
This facility was established in 1982 by the former Aso Town as part of efforts to revitalize tourism at Mount Aso. As Mount Aso is one of Japan's most active volcanoes, access to the crater is sometimes restricted, or the crater cannot be viewed due to bad weather. The museum is intended as a facility where visitors can learn more about the mountain at any time. In addition to permanent displays of volcano-related topics (lava, etc.), the facility also installed two cameras at the crater, allowing visitors to observe the current crater conditions in real time, and the sounds of the crater can also be heard at the same time, making for a more realistic and academic crater tour. In March 2004, the museum was transferred to private local company Aso Pharmaceutical.

Since 2008, the Aso volcano's topographical and geological heritage has been developed into a geopark, the museum has been positioned as a base facility. In 2011, the Aso Geopark Promotion Office was relocated and established within the museum.

== Exhibits ==
The museum features a diorama explaining the origins of the Aso Caldera. It was designed by special effects art director Yasuyuki Inoue, whose other work includes the 1984 film Godzilla.
