= Mount Aso Ropeway =

Aerial lift line in Aso, Kumamoto, Japan

Coordinates: 32°52′48.9″N 131°4′46.8″E

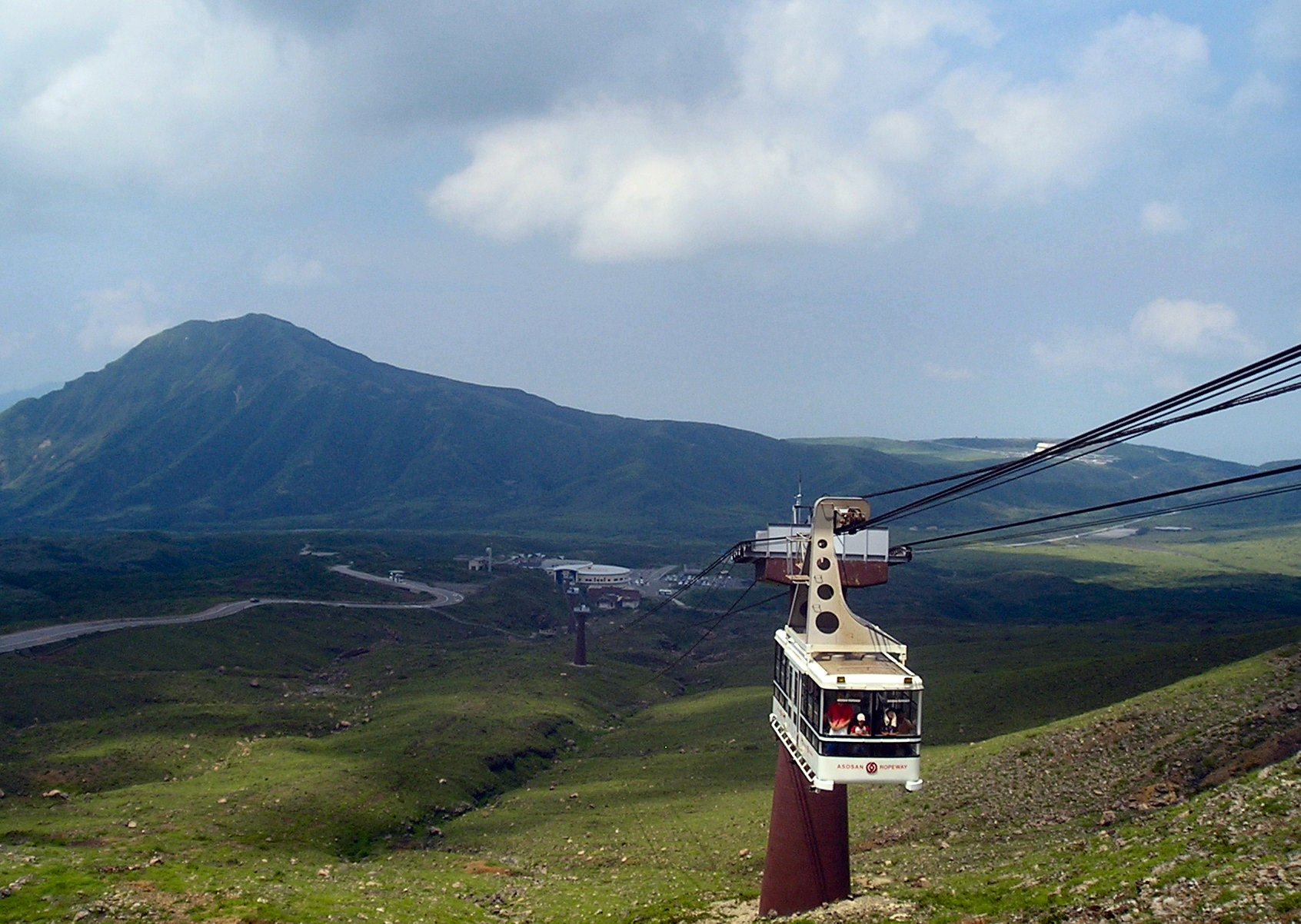
- Interactive map of Mount Aso Ropeway

Overview
- Status: Non-Operational
- Character: Aerial tramway
- Location: Mount Aso, Aso, Kumamoto, Japan
- No. of stations: 2
- Open: 10 April 1958

Operation
- Carrier capacity: 41 Passengers per cabin, 2 cabins
- Trip duration: 4 min

Technical features
- Line length: 858 m (2,815 ft)
- No. of cables: 2 track cables and 2 haulage ropes
- Operating speed: 3.6 m/s
- Vertical Interval: 108 m (354 ft)
- Maximum Gradient: 17°47′

The Mt. Aso Ropeway (阿蘇山ロープウェイ, Asosan Rōpuwei) was a Japanese aerial lift line in Aso, Kumamoto, operated by Kyūshū Sankō Tourism (九州産交ツーリズム, Kyūshū Sankō Tsūrizumu).

== Overview ==
It was opened in 1958, and climbs Mount Aso. Its official website claims it was the first aerial lift in the world to be built on an active volcano. It went up from the west side of the crater edge, each 15-20 min. It only ran during Volcanic Alert Level 1 (normal).

It often stopped operating due to higher Volcanic Alert Levels. The last operation time was in August 2014.

=== Aso Super Ring ===
On the first floor of the original rope station building, there was a 3D projector showing the Mount Aso scenes of 4 seasons, and the geographic history of craters.

=== Dismantling ===
During the 2016 Kumamoto earthquakes, the cable station and ropes were damaged by volcanic ash and earthquakes. On 28 February 2018, the crater access restriction was lifted, but the ropeway stayed closed. A shuttle bus service runs from the original boarding area, Mount Aso terminal, to the crater's edge as a replacement. On 12 October 2018, it was announced that the station and ropes would be dismantled, with a target to finish by spring 2019.

== See also ==
- List of aerial lifts in Japan
