= Aso Shrine =

Shinto shrine in Kumamoto Prefecture, Japan

Aso Shrine (阿蘇神社, Aso-jinja)
- 阿蘇神社
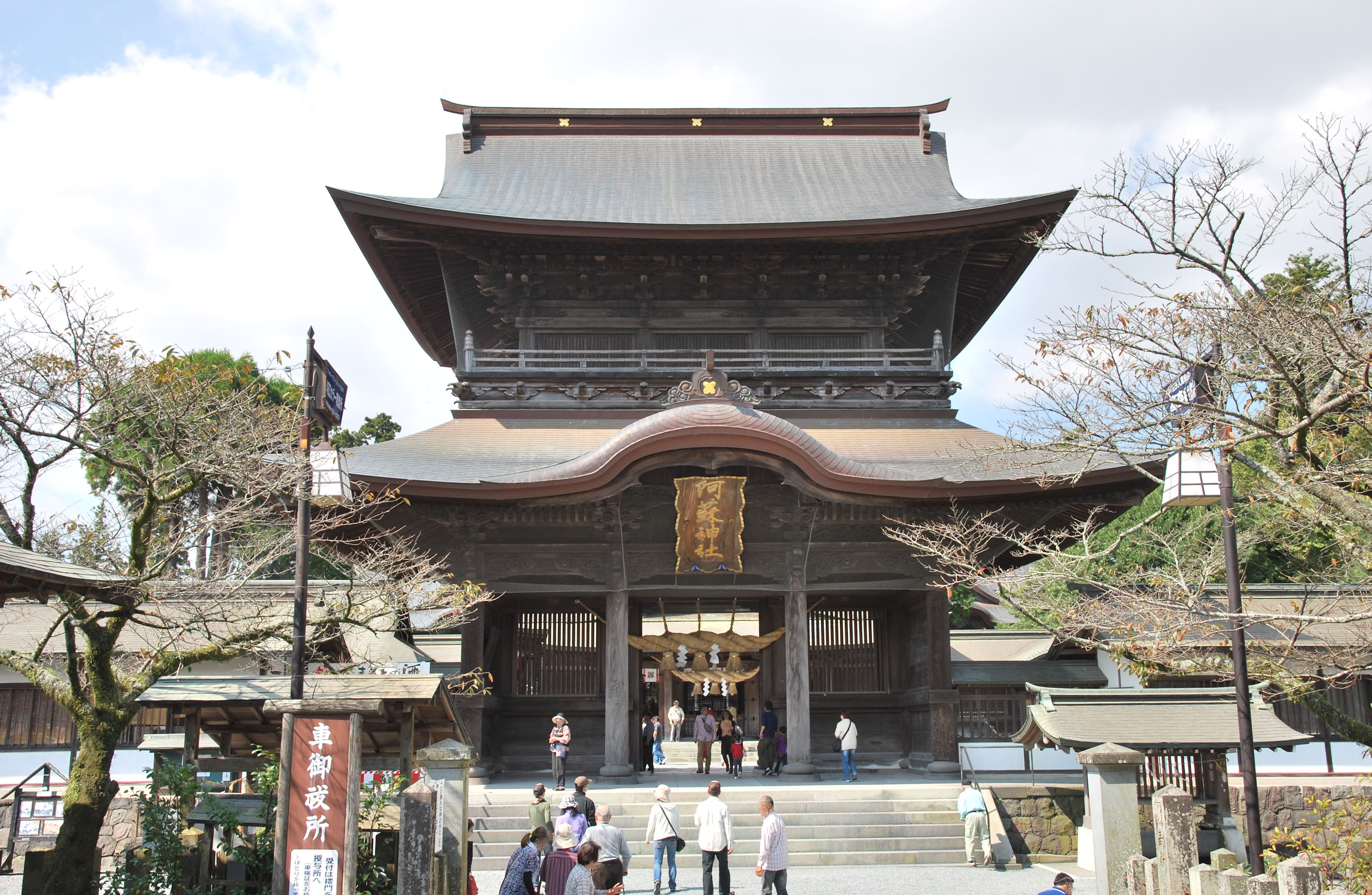
- The Aso Shrine Rōmon, an Important Cultural Property, pictured here in 2012, was destroyed in the 2016 Kumamoto earthquakes.

- Location within Japan

Religion
- Affiliation: Shinto
- Deity: Takeiwatatsu-no-Mikoto
- Type: Shinto Shrine
- Leadership: Aso clan (阿蘇家族）

Location
- Location: 3083-1 Ichinomiya-machi Miyaji, Aso, Kumamoto Prefecture 869-2612, Japan
- Coordinates: 32°56′52″N 131°06′57.5″E

Architecture
- Style: Shinto shrine style
- Established: 281 BC

Website
- http://asojinja.or.jp/

Aso Shrine (阿蘇神社, Aso-jinja) is a Shinto Shrine in Aso, Kumamoto Prefecture, Japan. Aso is one of the oldest shrines in Japan. This shrine holds several Important Cultural Properties, including Ichi-no-shinden (一の神殿), Ni-no-shinden (二の神殿), and Rōmon (楼門). The Aso family in charge of the shrine is said to have the second oldest recorded lineage in Japan after the Imperial family. The Aso Shrine was heavily damaged in the 2016 Kumamoto earthquakes. The shrine's rōmon (tower gate) completely collapsed. The haiden (worshiping hall) also collapsed.

== History ==
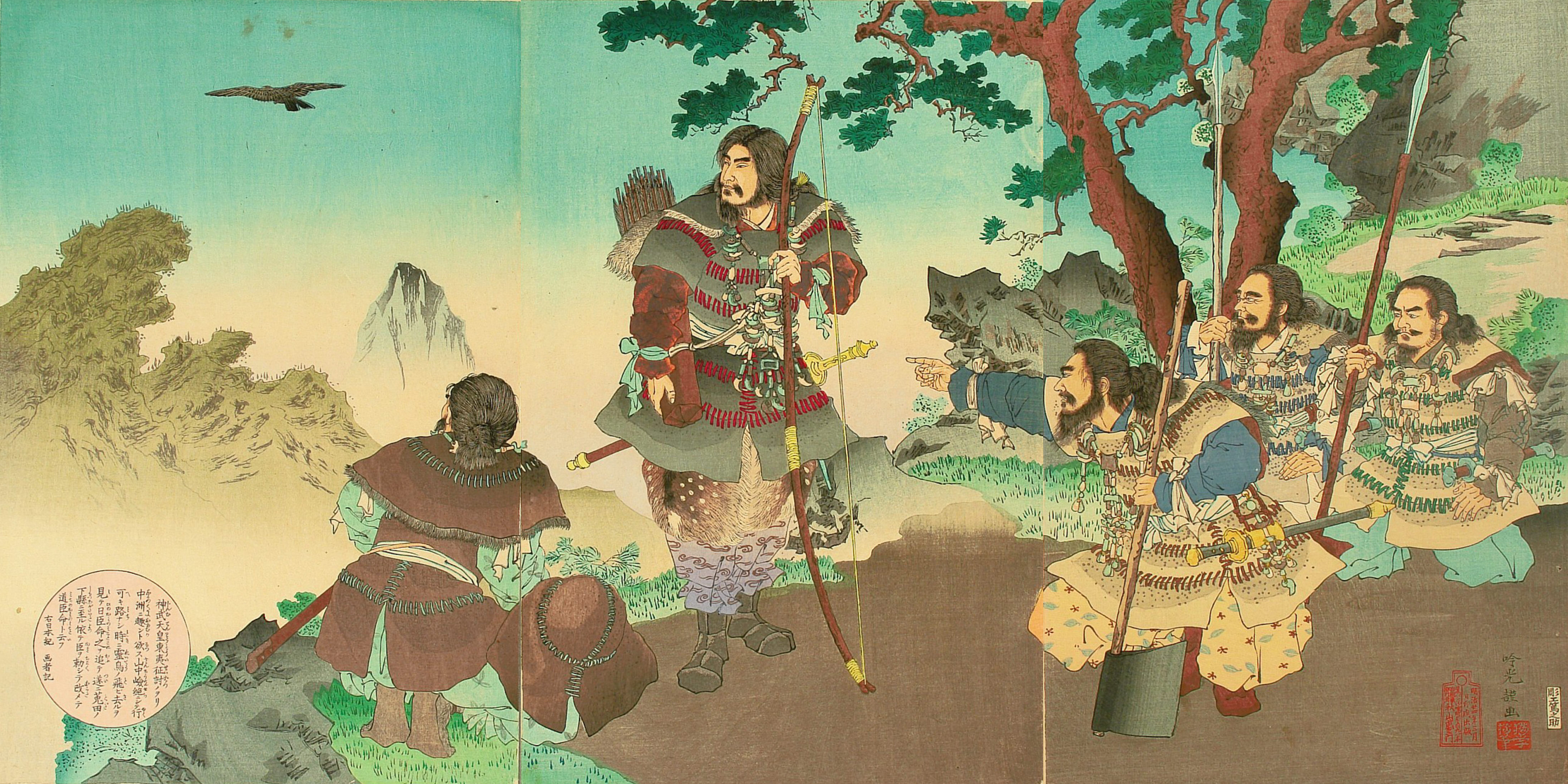
Emperor Jimmu, who is said to be an ancestor of Takeiwatatsu-no-mikoto.

Aso Shrine at Mount Aso in Kyushu is traditionally held to have been a center of worship before the accession of Emperor Jinmu. The shikinaisha shrine complex at Ichinomiya in what is today Kumamoto Prefecture was said to have been established in 281 BC.

The earliest records of the shrine are found in Chinese historical chronicles like the Zuisho-Wakoku-Den from the 7th century that states that the people of Aso held festivals every time Mt. Aso erupted to calm its wrath. Historical information of the shrine can also be found in the Nihon-Shoki, Nihon-Kiryaku, Shoku-Nihon-Kouki, Montoku-Jitsuroku, Sandai-Jitsuroku, and the Chikushi-no-Kuni-Fudoki-Itsubun.

Records also link the founding of the shrine to the reign of Emperor Kōrei (孝霊天皇, Kōrei-tennō). By the middle of the 11th century, the shrine was involved in national issues as they played out across Kyushu. During the ascendancy of the Kamakura shogunate, the Hōjō clan exercised a significant influence over the affairs of Aso Shrine.

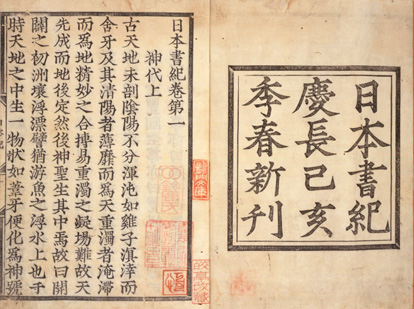
Information about the shrine's existence can be found in the Nihon Shoki as well as several texts from China.

The shrine is dedicated to the veneration of Takeiwatatsu-no-Mikoto (健磐龍命), who was a grandson of Japan's first emperor and the brother of Emperor Suizei, the second monarch on the traditional list of emperors. In the same period that Emperor Jimmu was establishing his palace at Kashihara at the foot of Mount Unebi in Yamato province, Takeiwatasu was sent to Aso where he helped establish a number of agricultural communities; and later, he is said to have built a palace at Miyagi.

The original location of the shrine is uncertain because it was destroyed and rebuilt many times in or near the crater of Aso-san. The shrine is said to be thousands of years old, however the present buildings date only from the Tenpō era (1830–1843). Construction of the shrine took 20 years from Tenpō 06 (1835) through Koka (1844–1848), Kaei (1848–1854) and Ansei (1854–1860) periods.

Aso was the chief Shinto shrine (Ichinomiya) of the old Higo Province. It serves today as one of the Ichinomiya of Kumamoto Prefecture.

From 1871 through 1946, the Aso Shrine was officially designated one of the Kanpei-taisha (官幣大社), meaning that it stood in the first rank of government supported shrines.

== Shinto belief ==
Aso-no-Ōkami, the kami or spirit who is believed to dwell at Aso Shrine has been worshipped from early times as the guardian deity of safety in navigation, and today, Aso-no-Ōkami is seen as protecting worshippers from traffic accidents and other untoward events.

Yabusame is an annual festival which brings together horse-mounted archers, special arrows and targets, and Shinto ritual at Aso Shrine.

The Aso no Himatsuri festival has its origin in the month of March festivals such as Aso no Noyaki (the first burning in Aso) and Aso jinja no Hifuri shinji (the fire ritual of Aso Shrine). Although rarely performed today, ceremonies which honor ancestors who settled near the Aso caldera do continue to be associated with the Aso jinja.

=== Deities ===
There are 13 kami enshrined at Aso shrine.

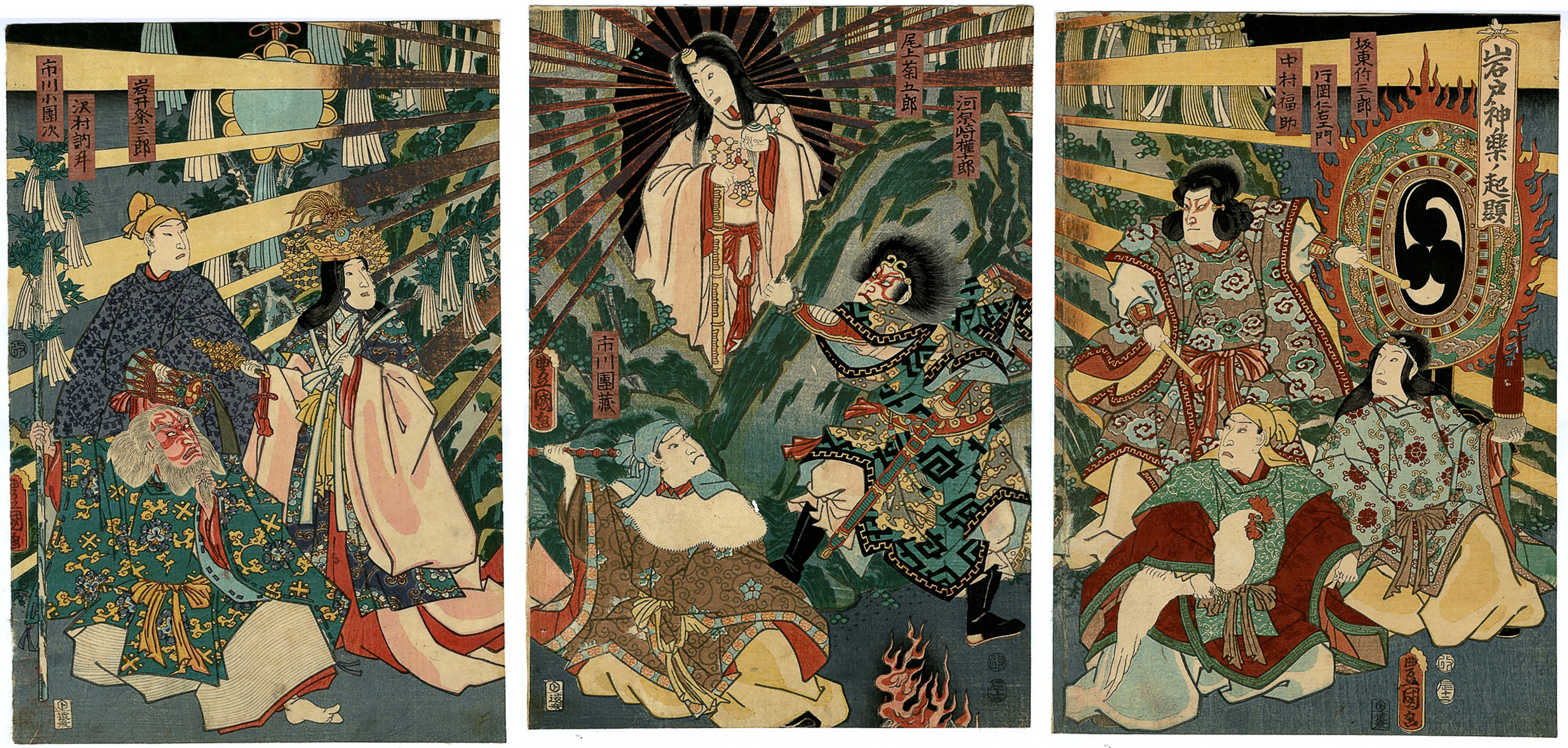
The Goddess Amaterasu is said to be the source of Takeiwatatsu-no-mikoto's divine powers, as her descendant.

The shrine's main kami is Ichinomiya Takeiwatatsu-no-mikoto (一の宮健磐龍命) the creator of Aso and the God credited with teaching the villagers about agriculture. He is said to be the descendant of Emperor Jinmu. Since Takeiwatatsu-no-mikoto was descended from Emperor Jinmu who is said to have been human, legends surrounding his divinity is unclear. Some state that through his lineage from the Goddess Amaterasu he was given divine powers for creating Aso. Another legend states that the deity of the volcano, entered the body of Takeiwatatsu-no-mikoto turning him from a human into a divine being. These are common folklore among the people with the only consensus being that over time, the deity of the land and the deity of the volcano was combined into one symbol by the name of Takeiwatatsu-no-mikoto.

The second important deity is called Ninomiya Aso-tsu-hime-no-mikoto the wife of Takeiwatatsu-no-mikoto (二の宮阿蘇都媛命).

The third important deity mentioned is Juuichinomiya Kuni-no-miyatsuko-hayamikatama-no-mikoto (十一の宮園造速瓶玉命).

The other deities are the kami of fire 火の神, the kami of water 水の神 flowing near the rōmon gate of the shrine and the other kami of agriculture 農の神.

== Festivals ==
=== U-no-matsuri ===
The Aso shrine's U-no-matsuri (卯の祭) is a 13-day event that occurs in March to welcome spring and pray for the beginning of the rice planting season. The U-no-matsuri marks the anniversary of Aso shrine's chief deity Takeiwatatsu-no-Mikoto's arrival in Aso. This event occurred in the second month of the lunar calendar which is March in the current calendar. The shrine's Guuji San perform sacred Shinto music and dances every day of the festival while praying for a rich harvest.

Occurring simultaneously to the U-no-matsuri, is a prominent festival called the Tazukuri Matsuri (田作り祭り) which is celebrated over 7 days, and the Daihimonjiyaki (大火文字焼き) which is the lighting of the Chinese characters for "fire" and "flame" on the mountains which is also done around the same time and sometimes the same day as the Tazukuri Matsuri.

=== Dai-Himonjiyaki ===
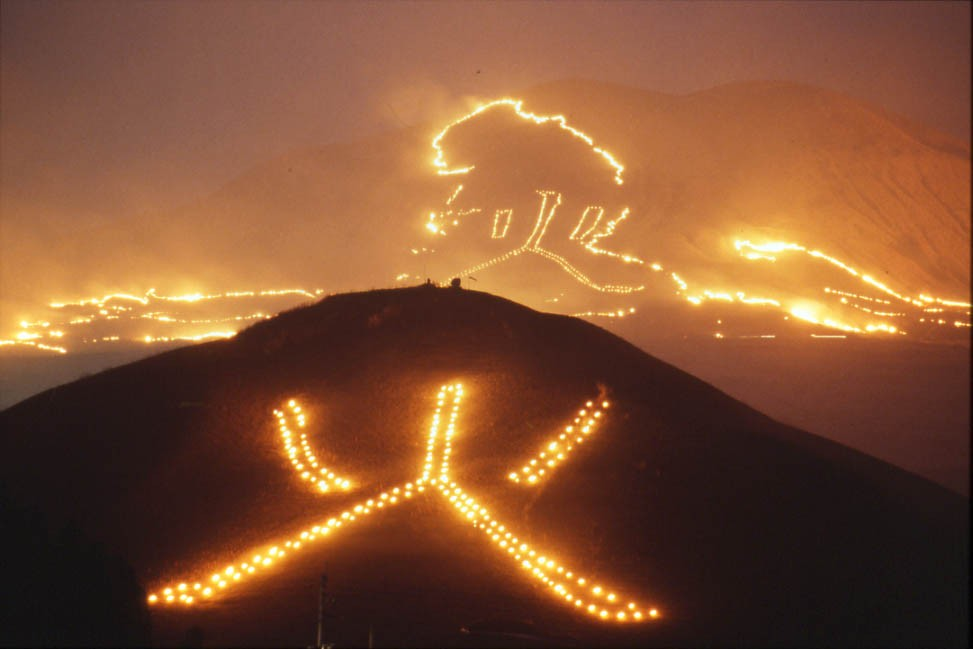
The Daihimonjiyaki 大火文字焼き on Ojodake and Motozuka showing the kanji characters for 火 and 炎.

The Daihimonjiyaki (大火文字焼き) is part of the Noyaki (のやき, burning of the hills) that occurs in Aso, at the beginning of March every year. The hills are burnt to stop the growth of trees allowing the grass to take over, thereby maintaining Aso's famous grasslands. The kanji (Chinese character) for fire Hi (火)、and the character for flame Hono (炎) is lit onto Ojo-dake and Motozuka (known locally as Kitazuka) which are two hills, on the second Saturday of March every year. The symbol can be seen from the top of the caldera to the surrounding villages. Fireworks and market stalls are also planned as part of the overall festival.

As of the year 2016, after the Kumamoto earthquake, this event has been discontinued by the city.

=== Tazukuri Matsuri ===
The Tazukuri Matsuri (田作り祭り) is a week-long festival held at Aso shrine starting from the Mi no hi, (巳の日, the day of the snake) and continuing on to the I no hi (亥の, day of the boar). These days are according to the old Japanese calendar and respond to different days on the Gregorian calendar every year. The most notable days within this week is the Hifuri Shinji. The Tazukuri Matsuri is held in accordance with the belief that if the deities of the shrine got married before the rice planting season, the harvest would be rich. Each day of the matsuri corresponds to a wedding event celebrating the marriage of the deities. On day 1 (day of the snake) the male deity who will be the bridegroom and resides in Aso shrine is transferred to a mikoshi (portable shrine) by three Shinto priests and taken to the house of one of the priests of the shrine. On day 4 (day of the monkey) two of the shrine priests go to Yoshimatsu Shrine in Akamizu, Aso, to collect the "shintai" of the bride deity. The "shintai" is an object of worship believed to contain the spirit of a deity. They transfer the bride deity to a mikoshi where they return to Aso shrine. The villagers line up to light her path giving rise to the Hifuri Shinji festival. The last three days of the festival is considered the honeymoon of the deities at the shrine priests house. On the last day of the festival (day 7, day of the boar) seven shrine priests invite the deities to their house where they perform sacred music, rituals and dances. A sacred play is also performed to symbolize the growth of rice.

==== Hifuri Shinji ====
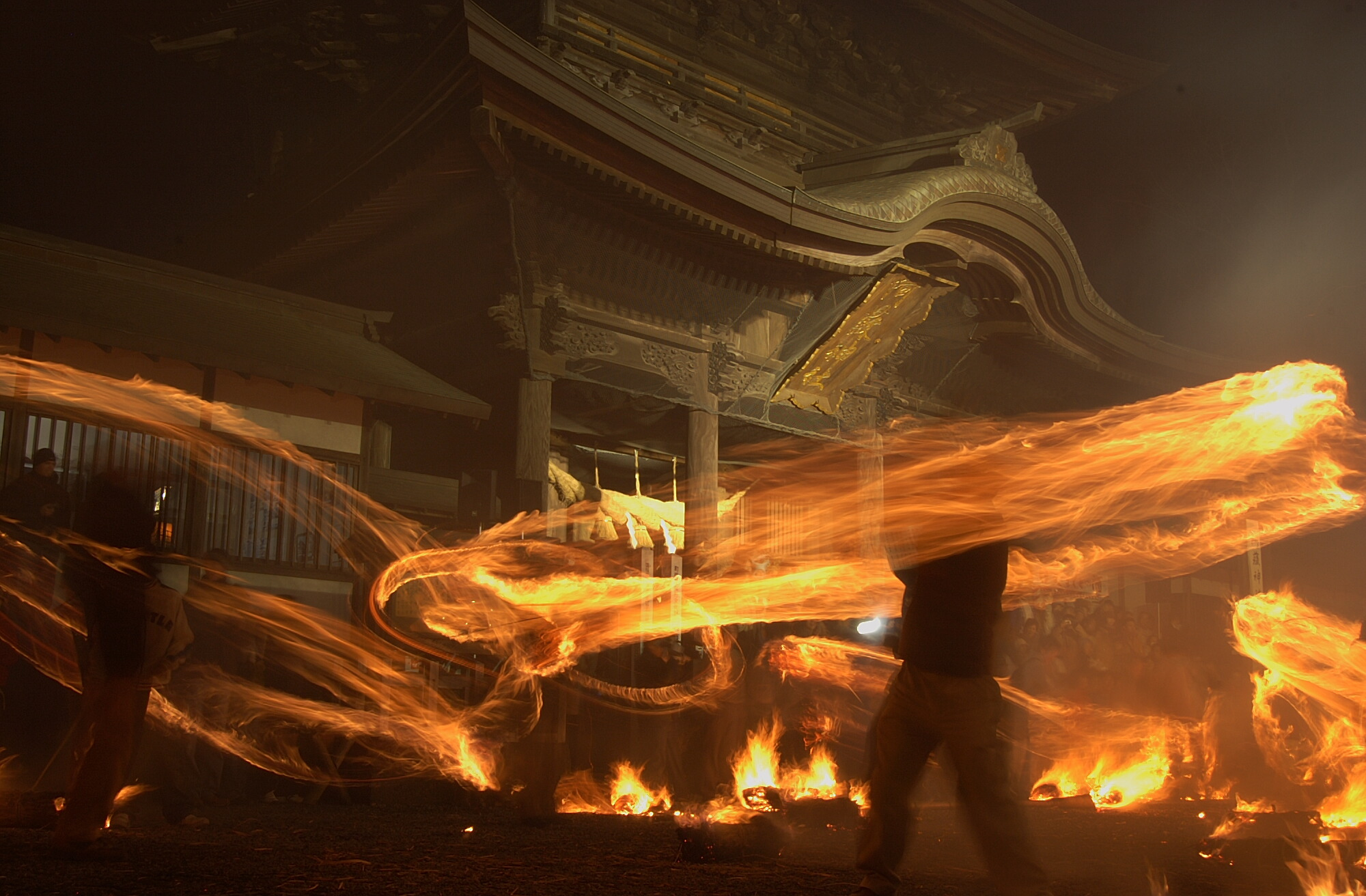
Swinging of the Hifuri at Aso Jinja, Aso City, Kumamoto Prefecture.

This is a fire-swinging ritual where bales of hay are lit on fire and swung around by the villagers to welcome the Bride Deity to Aso shrine on the evening of her nuptials. This day falls on the fourth day of the Tazukuri Matsuri week, the Saru no hi (猿の日, day of the monkey). While the ceremony is conducted by the shrine's Guji San (priests) in the shrine itself, visitors and well-wishers celebrate by listening to taiko and participating in the fire swinging event. The day begins with two shinto priests from Aso shrine who go on horseback to collect the female deity from Yoshimatsu Shrine in Akamizu. The shrine priests collect the shintai of the bride deity from a sacred kashi (oak) tree on the shrine grounds. These branches are said to contain the spirit of the bride deity, who came from the heavens for her marriage. The "shintai" of the bride deity is placed into a mikoshi (portable shrine) to be transported. The procession for the bride starts in Akamizu but stops in eight shrines along the way. At each shrine the bride deity, receives gifts for her wedding. The procession can be viewed by the public. At around 6pm, the procession arrives at Aso shrine for the wedding ceremony to begin. In March, the sun usually sets before 6pm and so the villagers gather to light the way for the bride deity. The villagers set bales of hay (hifuri) on fire and swing them around to light up the area. The priests carry the bride deity into the shrine where the marriage ceremony takes place. After the ceremony, the couple deities are placed into the same mikoshi and transported to the house of a priest for their honeymoon. Outside, the villagers continue to light bales of hay on fire and swing them around to the accompaniment of taiko until around 8:30pm.

=== Onda Matsuri ===
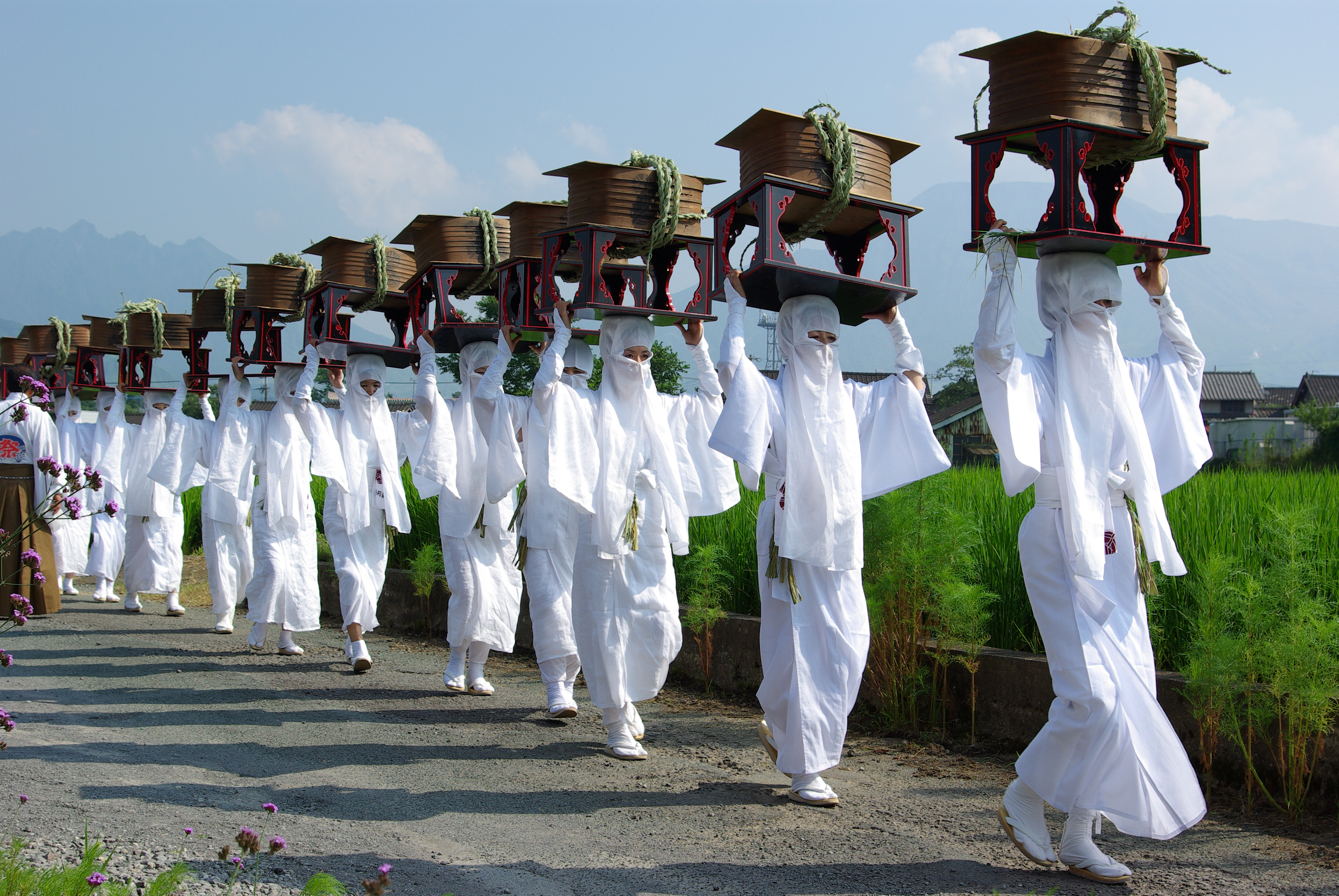
The Unari- women clad in white, walking in the gyouretsu procession in the fields of Aso City, Kumamoto Prefecture.

The Onda Matsuri is a Shinto festival held by Aso shrine to pray for a bountiful harvest of rice in the village of Aso. The matsuri involves the people of the village who join in the different factions needed to make up the procession.

The procession, called a Gyouretsu (行列) includes the Unari (宇奈利, 14 women clad in white), 4 mikoshi (神輿) containing the Gods, and farming dolls. The Gyouretsu set out from Aso shrine in the morning to walk around the surrounding rice fields where the shrine's Guji San pray for the Gods to bestow their blessings upon the young rice plants. The procession is accompanied by taiko drums and a ceremonial song, sung by the men in the procession. The Onda Matsuri is held on July 26 and 28 every year. The festivities on the 28th are open to the public and begins in the morning. On the morning of the festival the 12 Gods of Aso, the God of water (水の神) and the God of fire (火の神) are placed into 4 mikoshi (portable shrines) and carried on the shoulders of the men from the village. Following the mikoshi are the shrine priests on horseback as the second set in the lineup. The third set consists of the unari which are women from the village, clad in white and carrying the food for the Gods on their heads. The food consists of konbu, rice, and vegetables like eggplant but no meat. Next in the lineup for the procession are young village boys who dress in white and carry dolls on wooden sticks with the faces of an old man and woman and an ox. This represents the old days when rice was planted manually before machinery came into use. The God of navigation (Sarutahiko no Mikoto) and the Representative of people who plant rice (Saotome) also join the procession. The procession then goes through the rice fields of the neighbouring village for the crops to receive the blessings of the Gods.

=== Tanomi Sai ===
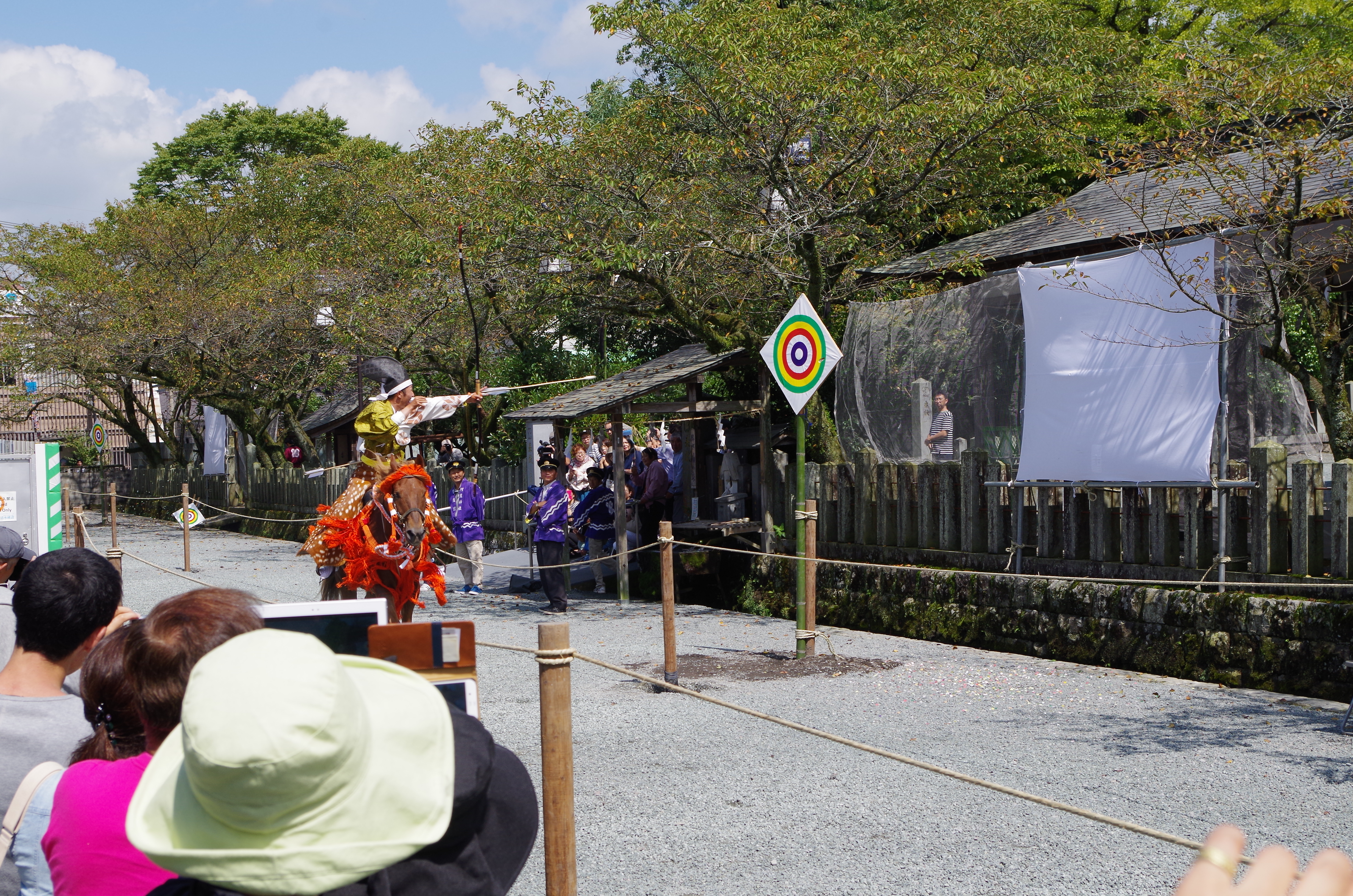
Yabusame at Aso Jinja, Aso City, Kumamoto Prefecture.

The Tanomi Sai is the last of the three large Shinto festivals held by Aso Shrine for the year. The Guji San at Aso shrine conduct special ceremonies to give thanks to the Agriculture kami for the successful harvesting of the rice. As a sign of their gratitude to the gods, the farmers of the neighboring village give their first crop of rice as an offering.

The festival is held on 25 and 26 September every year, with the main events being held on the 25th.

On the morning of 25 September, the farmers and Guji San gather at Aso shrine where they conduct the necessary rituals. Around midday, several tribute events are held on the shrine's 130m long sacred walking path. The main event is the Yabusame, which is Japanese archery (弓道, Kyūdō) performed on horseback. This event was initially performed by the men in the village, however these days, it is performed entirely by the equestrian club of the local Aso Chuo High School. The students of the club dress in clothing similar to the ones worn by the former Samurai family of Aso. The archers ride up and down the grounds trying their hand at sending an arrow into the center of the target. The event is not competition and is done solely for the entertainment of the Gods and villagers. Sumo matches are also held with members of the surrounding village's sumo club participating in the event.

There are no public events on 26 September, and it is a day of prayer and rituals carried out by the shrine's priests.

=== Other festivals ===
The following festivals are held by the shrine annually but are not commonly observed by the public. Farmers and interested parties are welcome to observe:

==== Toukano-sechie ====
The Toukano-sechie is held on January 13 of the lunar calendar (mid-February now) and is a ceremony where farmers sing "Tauta" -rice planting songs while working. The lyrics celebrate the coming New Year. Traditionally people stamp while singing the song to wake up the earth spirits.

==== Kaza-matsuri ====
The Kaza-matsuri is held twice a year; 4 April of the lunar calendar (mid-May now) and 4 July (mid-August now). The festival is held to pray for the protection of the crops from wind damage. At this time of the year, winds are especially strong in Aso which leads to crop damage. The Shrine's Guuji San exorcise the winds by utilizing Gohei (a ritual for driving away evil winds). The Guuji San drive the winds from Kaza-miya, a shrine which enshrines the deities of the Wind in Miyaji, Aso, to the one in Teno. The Guuji San follow two different routes to the same destination.

==== Nemurinagashi ====
The Nemurinagashi is celebrated every year on 6 August. This date corresponds to the mid-summer day where hotter temperatures bring general fatigue on the farmers. On the night of the 6th, the farmers walk around Aso village singing Tauta songs for the last time, in their efforts to banish sleep .

==== Hitaki Shinji ====
The Guuji San of Aso shrine participate in a ritual at Shimo Shrine from 19 August, to October 19 every year. A young girl from the village is chosen as the "Lighting girl" who conducts the prayer for frost free weather to protect the crops from the curse of Kihachi. The wood is kept burning in a hitaki (woodburning den) for 59 days.

The origins of the festivals can be traced back 700 years from the Aso-jinja-shinnoubutsu-chumon-utsusi, an old book detailing the chronicles of Aso shrine.

== Mythology of the shrine ==
=== The creation of Aso ===
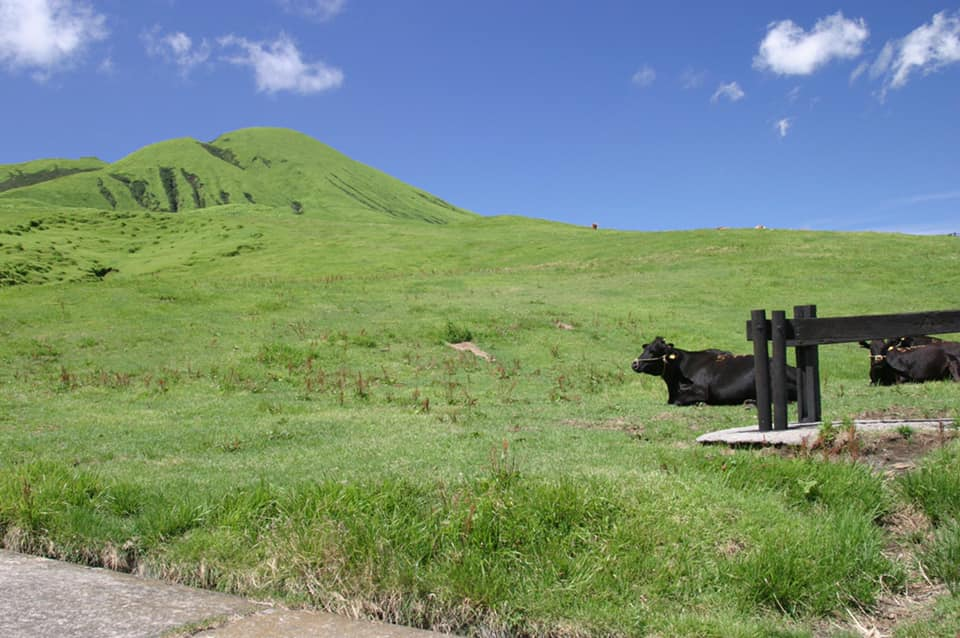
Ojodake on Mt. Aso where Takeiwatatsu-no-Mikoto practised his archery.

According to an interview with several priests at Aso shrine, the legend of Takeiwatatsu-no-Mikoto and the formation of Aso City, is as follows:

Thousands of years ago, the crater now known as Aso city was said to be filled with water and was thereby a huge lake surrounded by the outer rim of the caldera. Takeiwatatsu-no-Mikoto kicked in the western side of the caldera at what is now known as Tateno, Minami-Aso. He fell from the effort and was unable to stand for a while hence the name "Tateno" meaning "unable to stand up."As the water drained away forming rivers on the outside of the valley, a huge catfish (Namazu) appeared. The catfish was settled at the bottom of the lake where some stories say it was asked to leave by Takeiwatatsu-no-Mikoto. The catfish went to Namazu, Kashima where Namazu-sha Shrine was established to pay homage to the soul of the catfish as the spirit of the lake. Now the shrine is in the precincts of the Kokuzo Shrine.

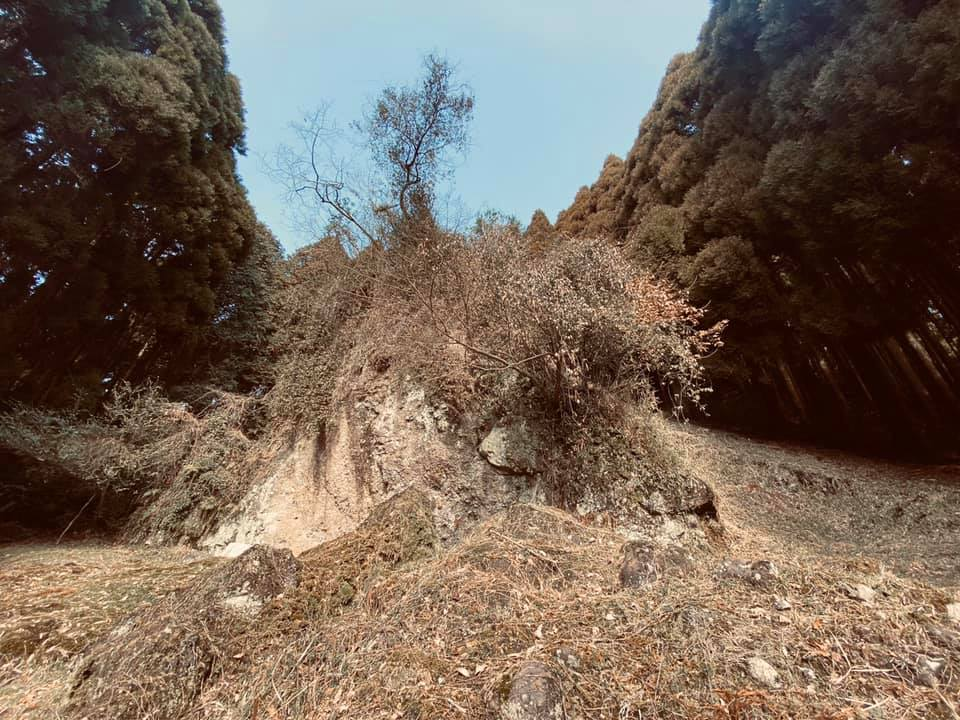
The Matoishi (target stone) that Kihachi was sent to, to retrieve the arrows for Takeiwatatsu-no-Mikoto.

=== The legend of Kihachi ===
The legend of Kihachi surrounds the Hitaki-Shinji festival commemorated in Aso annually. Legend states that Takeiwatatsu-no-mikoto liked practicing his archery. He would stand on Ojodake (a cone shaped formation on Mt. Aso) and practice shooting matoishi (target stone) in what is now Matoishi in Aso, located north of the caldera. Kihachi his servant, was in charge of bringing the arrows back from the matoishi to Takeiwatatsu-no-Mikoto. After the 100th arrow was shot, Kihachi got tired and kicked the arrow back breaking it in half. Takeiwatatsu-no-Mikoto was furious and drawing his sword slayed Kihachi cutting off his head. Kihachi's head ascended as a deity vowing to exact revenge on Takeiwatatsu-no-Mikoto's village of Aso. Later, during the winter months it frosted in Aso valley damaging all of the crops. Takeiwatatsu-no-Mikoto realised that this was the revenge that Kihachi had spoken of and so he enshrined his soul at Shimo Shrine (frost shrine) to abate his anger. A ritual called the Hitaki-Shinji was started where a fire is kept for 2 months to pray for a good harvest and prevent frost damage to the crops. They say that this is why the winters in Aso are so cold.

=== Takasago-no-matsu ===
There is a sacred marriage pine on the grounds of Aso shrine. It is said that if a woman walks around the tree twice counterclockwise and the man she loves walks around the tree once clockwise he would encompass her wish and the two will have a happy relationship.

=== Aso Ogami ===
The Aso Ogami is a kami stone with the divine powers to grant wishes. It is said that the Ogami put all his wishes into the stone and in turn grants them to anyone who makes a wish by keeping their wish in their mind, then stroking the stone three times and then reciting their wish.

== Chief Priest ==
The position of Chief Priest of Aso Shrine is hereditary and is passed down from generation to generation with the oldest male in the family becoming the new head of the shrine. The Aso family has the second oldest recorded lineage in Japan after the Imperial family. The family themselves are said to be descendants of Takeiwatatsu-no-Mikoto. The Aso family were priests but also rose to power as a powerful samurai clan in the 11th century. They remained in prominence until the 16th century as their feudal lord continued to rule over half of what is now known as Kumamoto Prefecture. This contributed economically to the family and the shrine, allowing them to rebuild shrine buildings and hold festivals. It also made it possible for them to establish branches of the Aso shrine in other locations. Some of those shrines still remain in up to 500 locations to this day. Koreyuki Aso (Aso Koreyuki in Japanese name order) was the 91st Chief Priest of Aso Shrine with his son being the 92nd.

Emperor Jimmu
Kanakori no Kami	Kamuyaimimi no Mikoto	Kunitatsu no Kami	Hime Miko no Kami
Imperial Family Line	Takeiwatatsu no Mikoto	Asotsuhime no Mikoto	Shinhiko no Mikoto	Yahime no Kami
Hayamikatama no Mikoto	Wakahiko no kami	Shinhime no Mikoto
Wakahime no Kami	Hikomiko no Kami	Aso Shrine Extended Family
Current Aso Shrine Priests

== Structure ==
Aso shrine is said to have been built 2300 years ago in a time where shrines were torn down and moved to more divine locations. The shrine also suffered from fires and earthquakes making most locations temporary. A permanent location wasn't chosen until 281 AD. The shrine has since been burnt down and damaged in earthquakes causing the current building to only date back to the 1830s. Most recently the shrine suffered considerable damage during the 2016 Kumamoto Earthquake and is currently under reconstruction.

=== External area of the shrine ===
==== Shrine grounds ====
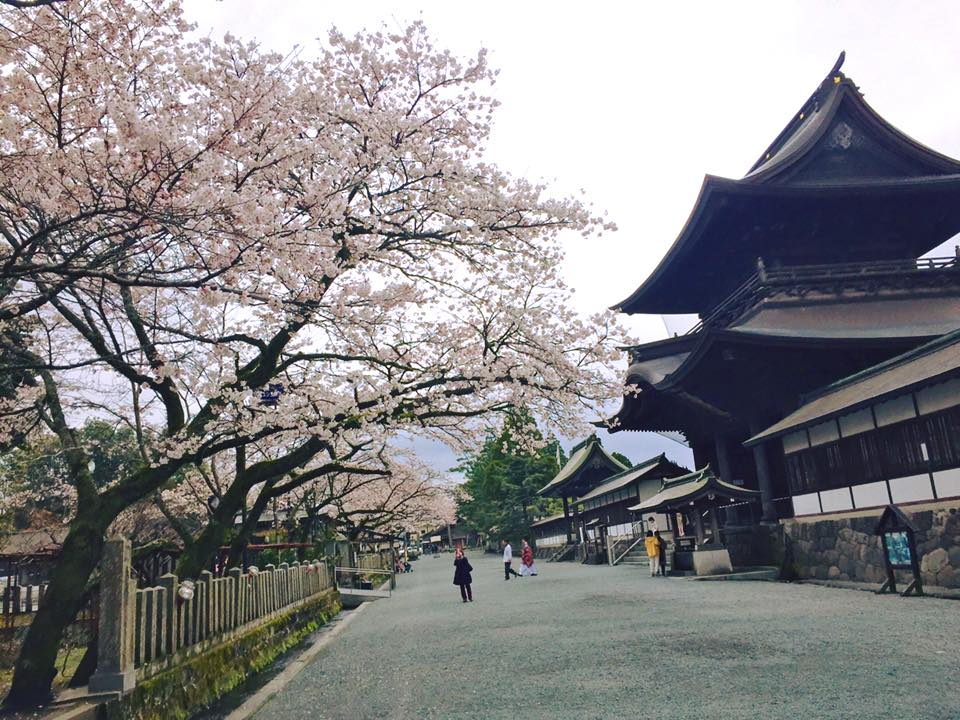
The "sideways approach" of Aso shrine that connects Mt. Nakadake to Aso Shrine and Kokuzo shrine.

There are three entrances to the shrine with the south gate (minami torii) facing Mount Aso, and the north gate leading onto the shopping street of Nakadori, Ichinomiya Aso. A guide office is situated by the main entrance. There are also two car parks, the first being by the eastern entrance of the shrine, and another by the north gate. The tombs of the ichi-no-shinden(一の神殿) is on the right side of the eastern entrance and the tomb of the ni-no-shinden(二の神殿) is on the left. The mizu-no-kami(水の神) is to the side of the eastern entrance of the shrine grounds. The entrance to the general shrine is unique in that the approach to the shrine extends sideways. This was done to align Mt. Nakadake which is the only peak in Mt. Aso to have a crater with Aso Shrine and Kokuzo Shrine. The approach was made sideways to welcome the deity of the volcano into the shrine. The grounds surrounding the shrine contain multiple cherry blossom trees, ginkgo trees and momiji trees, ensuring that the shrine's exterior displays the four seasons.

==== Shrine building ====
The exterior of the shrine facing the east has three gates. The main gate is the Rōmon (楼門 tower gate) which is 18m tall and has a double roof which is rare in Shinto shrine architecture. It was erected in the late Edo period 1850 (嘉永3年). It is flanked on both sides by two smaller gates called the Kangyomon (還御門) and Kamikomon (神幸門)both built in 1849 (嘉永2年). These are usually closed but are opened during the Onda Matsuri to allow the 4 portable shrines to exit the main shrine. This is done in accordance with the Imperial Palace System.

=== Internal area of the shrine ===
The haiden (hall of worship) was built in 1948. it is directly on the path from the rōmon to the inside of the shrine. At the side of this path is a Takasago Pine tree grown from a pine nut brought from Onoe in Harima-kuni (now known as Hyogo prefecture) in 1060 and planted. To the side of that is the Aso Ogami wishing stone. The shrine's office of internal affairs is to the left of the haiden.

==== Restricted area ====
Behind the haiden in Aso shrine are the three smaller shrines said to house Takeiwatatsu-no-mikoto and the other 11 kami of Aso shrine. These are the ichi-no-shinden built in 天保11年 (1840), the ni-no-shinden built in 天保 13 年(1842), and the san-no-shinden built in 天保 14年 (1843).

== 2016 earthquakes ==
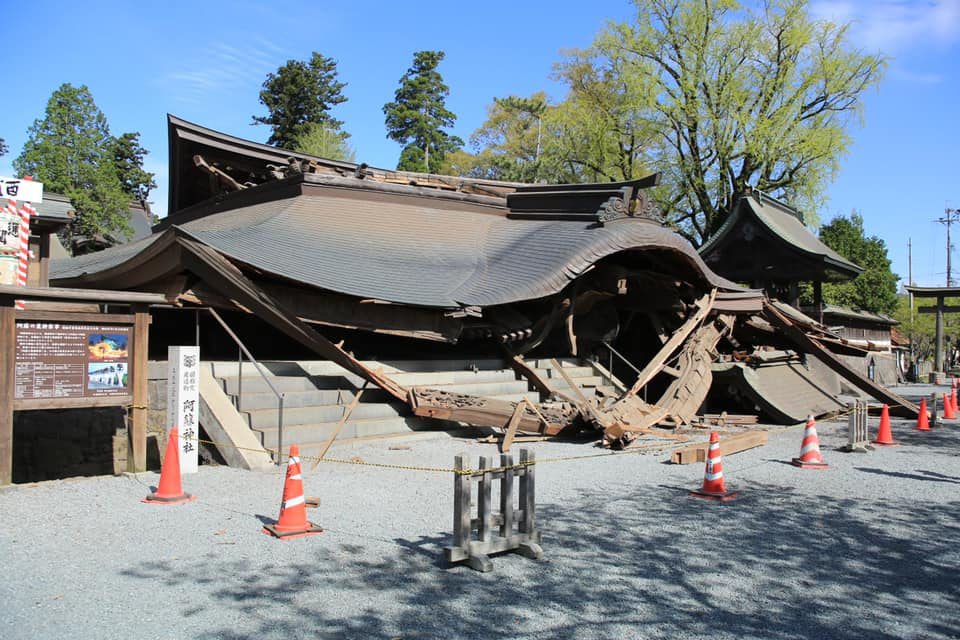
The collapsed state of the rōmon (tower) gate in Aso shrine. Repairs are expected to be completed in 2023.

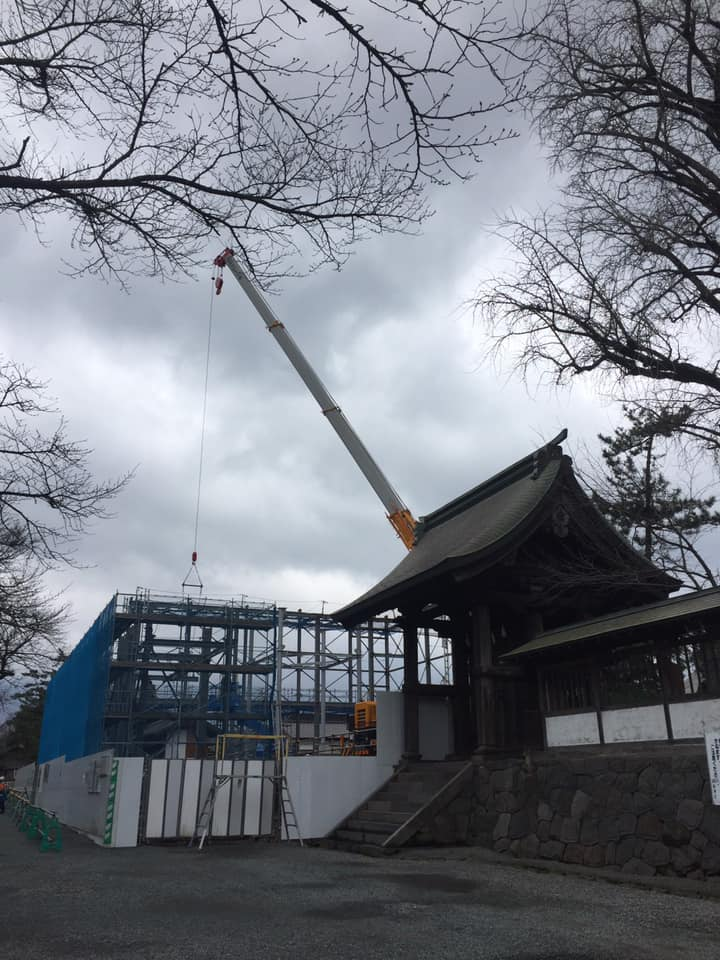
Construction work being done on Aso shrine. The shrine was damaged in the 2016 Kumamoto earthquakes.

Aso Shrine was heavily damaged during the 2016 earthquakes that struck Kumamoto on April 16, 2016, at 1:25 am JST, at a magnitude of 7.0. The shrine's rōmon (tower gate) was completely destroyed as well as the haiden (worship hall). The smaller Kangyomon and Kamikomon gates were also partially destroyed along with several smaller shrines said to house the deities on the inner parts of the main shrine. Reconstruction efforts are already underway with several smaller structures already having been completely repaired. Final reconstruction efforts are projected to be completed sometime in 2023. With the collapse of the rōmon gate, the entrance to the shrine is now situated near the south gate. A temporary building used for goshuin and omikuji are situated in the inner area of the rōmon gate. List of damaged properties in Aso shrine and their projected repair dates:

List of damaged properties in Aso shrine and the projected dates of completion for total repair. The properties are listed in order of importance to the public.
Structures	Construction date (beginning)	Construction date (end)
Rōmon (tower gate)	November 2016	Anticipated date: 2023
Haiden (worship hall)	November 2016	August 2018
Kangyomon and Kamikomon (smaller gates)	May 2017	September 2018
Ichi no Shinden (shrine house of the kami)	July 2018	March 2019
Ni no Shinden (shrine house of the kami)	May 2017	March 2019
San no Shinden (shrine house of the kami)	December 2016	September 2018

== Related shrines ==
Other Aso shrines include:

- Aso-jinja in Hamura, Tokyo.
- Aoi Aso Shrine in Hitoyoshi, Kumamoto.
- 461 shrines in Kumamoto Prefecture.
- 32 shrines in Ōita Prefecture.
- 7 shrines in Fukuoka Prefecture.
- 4 shrines in Miyazaki Prefecture.
- 19 shrines in Honshu.

This list from Aoi Aso Shrine to Honshu is cited here.

== See also ==
- List of Shinto shrines

== Notes ==
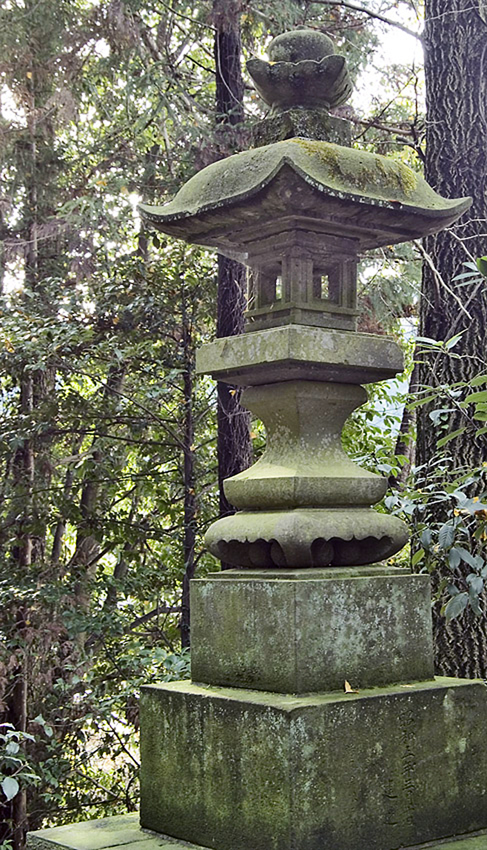
Stone lantern at branch shrine in Hamura, Tokyo.
