= Namino Station =

Railway station in Aso, Kumamoto Prefecture, Japan

Namino Station 波野駅
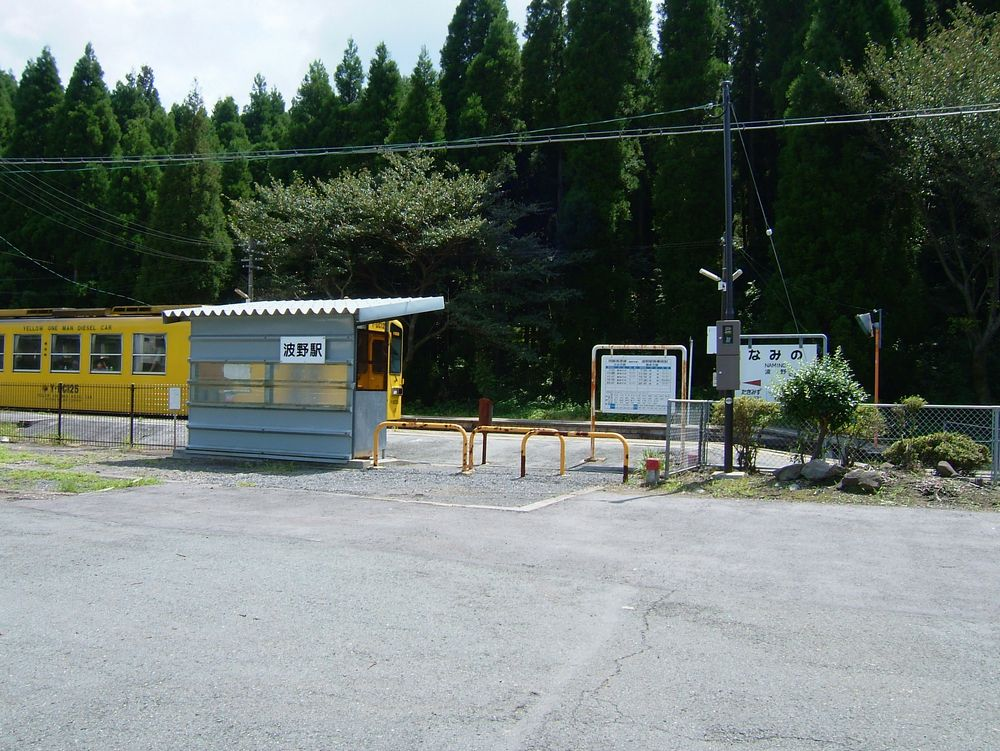
- Namino Station in 2007

General information
- Location: Namino Oaza Namino, Aso-shi, Kumamoto-ken 869-2806; Japan
- Coordinates: 32°56′19″N 131°11′42″E
- Operator: JR Kyushu
- Line: ■ Hōhi Main Line
- Distance: 64.1 km from Kumamoto
- Platforms: 2 side platforms
- Tracks: 2

Construction
- Structure type: At grade
- Cycle facilities: Bike shed

Other information
- Status: Unstaffed
- Website: Official website

History
- Opened: 2 December 1928

Services
Preceding station	JR Kyushu	Following station
Miyaji towards Kumamoto	Hōhi Main Line	Takimizu towards Ōita
Location
- Location within Kumamoto Prefecture Location within Japan

Namino Station (波野駅, Namino-eki) is a passenger railway station located in the city of Aso, Kumamoto, Japan. It Is operated by JR Kyushu.

== Lines ==
The station is served by the Hōhi Main Line and is located 64.1 km from the starting point of the line at Kumamoto.

== Layout ==
The station consists of two side platforms serving two tracks at grade. There is no station building and only platform 1 has a shelter for passengers. Access to the opposite side platform is by means of a level crossing. A bike shed is provided at the station forecourt.

A marker at the station announces that, at an altitude of 754 metres, Namino is the highest station in Kyushu.

=== Platforms ===
1	■ ■ Hōhi Main Line	for Bungo-Taketa
2	■ ■ Hōhi Main Line	for Miyaji

== History ==
Japanese Government Railways (JGR) had opened the Inukai Light Rail Line (犬飼軽便線) (later Inukai Line) from Ōita to Nakahanda on 1 April 1914. The track was extended westwards in phases, with Tamarai being established as its western terminus on 30 November 1925. Further to the west, JGR had, on 21 June 1914 opened the Miyaji Light Rail Line (宮地軽便線) (later the Miyaji Line) from Kumamoto east to Higo-Ōzu. This track was also extended in phases, reaching Miyaji as its eastern terminus on 25 January 1918. On 2 December 1928, Miyaji and Tamarai were linked up, with Namino opening on the same day as one of several intermediate stations along the new track. Through-traffic was established between Kumamoto and Ōita. The Inukai and Miyaji lines were merged and the entire stretch redesignated as the Hōhi Main Line. With the privatization of Japanese National Railways (JNR), the successor of JGR, on 1 April 1987, Namino came under the control of JR Kyushu.

On 17 September 2017, Typhoon Talim (Typhoon 18) damaged the Hōhi Main Line at several locations. Services between Aso and Nakahanda, including Namino, were suspended and replaced by bus services. Rail service from Aso through this station to Miemachi was restored by 22 September 2017 Normal rail services between Aso and Ōita were restored by 2 October 2017.

== Surrounding area ==
- Aso City Hano Elementary School
- Aso City Hano Junior High School

== See also ==
- List of railway stations in Japan
