= Ichinomiya, Kumamoto =

Dissolved municipality in Kumamoto prefecture, Japan

Ichinomiya (一の宮町, Ichinomiya-machi) was a town located in Aso District, Kumamoto Prefecture, Japan.

By 2003, the town had an estimated population of 9,977 and a density of 94.54 persons per km^{2}. The total area was 105.53 km^{2}.

On February 11, 2005, Ichinomiya, along with the town of Aso (former), and the village of Namino (all from Aso District), was merged to create the city of Aso and no longer exists as an independent municipality.

Ichinomiya literally means "the first shrine" of the province. In case of this town, it is referred to the Aso Shrine of the Higo Province.
