= Miyaji Station =

Railway station in Aso, Kumamoto Prefecture, Japan

Miyaji Station 宮地駅
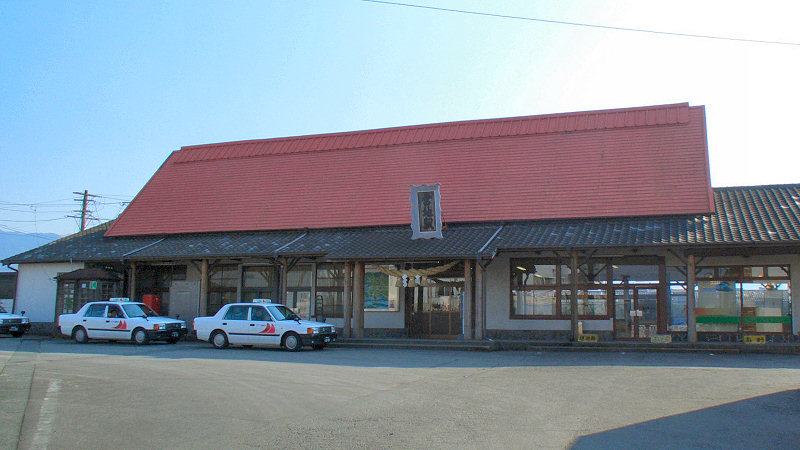
- Miyaji Station in 2007

General information
- Location: Ichinomiyamachi Miyaji, Aso-shi, Kumamoto-ken 869-2612; Japan
- Coordinates: 32°56′14″N 131°07′03″E
- Operator: JR Kyushu
- Line: ■ Hōhi Main Line
- Distance: 53.4 km from Kumamoto
- Platforms: 1 island platform
- Tracks: 2 + numerous sidings

Construction
- Structure type: At grade

Other information
- Status: Staffed ticket window (outsourced)
- Website: Official website

History
- Opened: 25 January 1918

Services
Preceding station	JR Kyushu	Following station
Ikoi-no-Mura towards Kumamoto	Hōhi Main Line	Namino towards Ōita
Location
- Location within Kumamoto Prefecture Location within Japan

Miyaji Station (宮地駅, Miyaji-eki) is a passenger railway station located in the city of Aso, Kumamoto, Japan. It Is operated by JR Kyushu.

== Lines ==
The station is served by the Hōhi Main Line and is located 53.4 km from the starting point of the line at Kumamoto.

== Layout ==
The station consists of an island platform serving two tracks at grade. The station building is a wooden structure of traditional Japanese design with a double tiled roof and has been built and decorated to resemble a Shinto shrine. It houses a waiting room and a staffed ticket window. Access to the island platform is by means of a level crossing. South of the station are numerous passing loops, sidings and a turntable, all belonging to a depot on the Hōhi Main Line.

Management of the station has been outsourced to the JR Kyushu Tetsudou Eigyou Co., a wholly owned subsidiary of JR Kyushu specialising in station services. It staffs the ticket window which is equipped with a POS machine but does not have a Midori no Madoguchi facility.

=== Platforms ===
1	■ ■ Hōhi Main Line	for Higo-Ōzu and Kumamoto
2	■ ■ Hōhi Main Line	for Bungo-Taketa and Oita

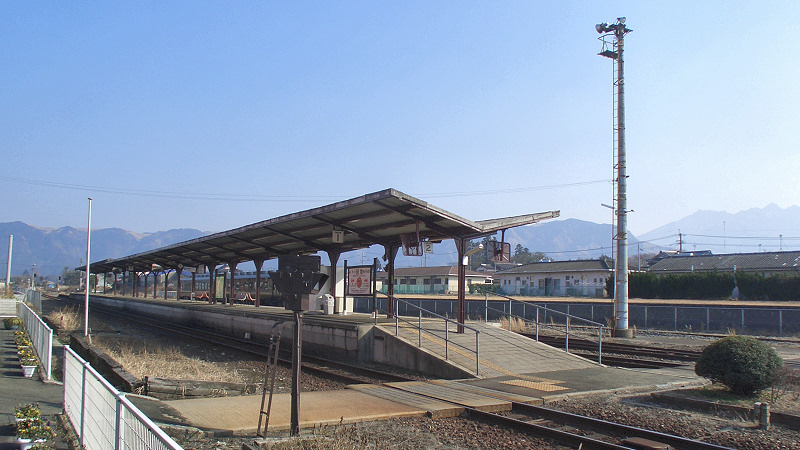
A view of the station platform with a close-up of the level crossing.

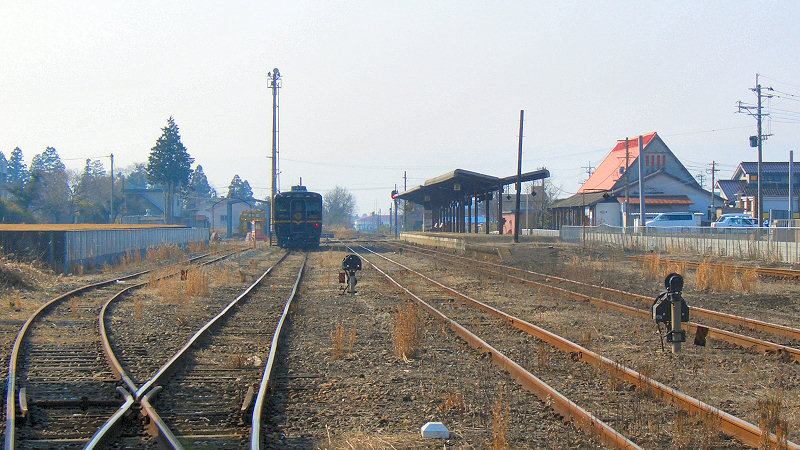
The station as seen approaching from the east. The depot with its sidings can be seen to the left.

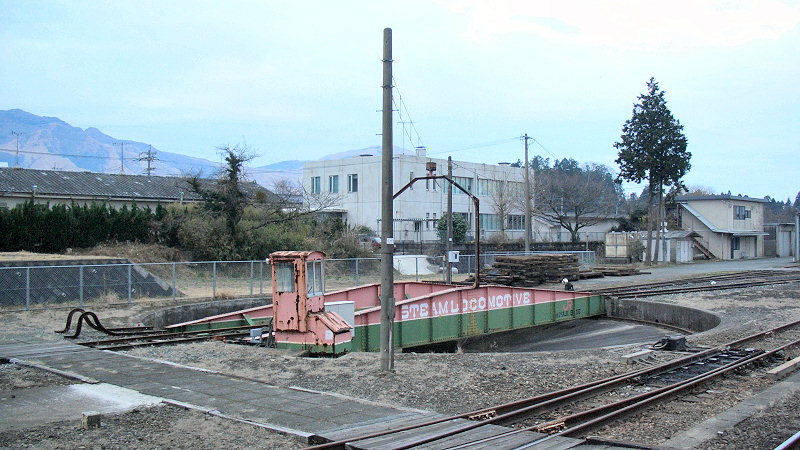
The turntable at the depot.

== History ==
On 21 June 1914, Japanese Government Railways (JGR) opened the Miyaji Light Rail Line (宮地軽便線) (later the Miyagi Line) from Kumamoto eastwards to Higo-Ōzu. The line was extended eastward in phases and Miyaji was established as the eastern terminal on 25 January 1918. On 2 December 1928, the station was linked up with Tamarai, the western terminus of the Inukai Line (犬飼線), which had been extended westwards in phases from Ōita since 1914. Through-traffic was established between Kumamoto and Ōita. The two lines were merged and the entire stretch redesignated as the Hōhi Main Line. With the privatization of Japanese National Railways (JNR), the successor of JGR, on 1 April 1987, Miyaji station came under the control of JR Kyushu.

On 17 September 2017, Typhoon Talim (Typhoon 18) damaged the Hōhi Main Line at several locations. Services between Aso and Nakahanda, including Miyaji, were suspended and replaced by bus services. Rail service from Aso through Miyaji to Miemachi was restored by 22 September 2017 Normal rail services between Aso and Ōita were restored by 2 October 2017.

== Environs ==
- Aso City Hall
- Japan National Route 57
- Aso Shrine
- Sensuikyō Gorge

== See also ==
- List of railway stations in Japan
