= Aso clan =

Japanese clan

The Aso clan (阿蘇氏, Aso Uji) is a Japanese clan whose members occupied the high head priest position of Aso Shrine in the Higo Province.
