= Namino, Kumamoto =

Dissolved municipality in Aso district, Kumamoto prefecture, Japan

Namino (波野村, Namino-son) was a village located in Aso District, Kumamoto Prefecture, Japan.

As of 2003, the village had an estimated population of 1,700 and a population density of 23.82 persons per km^{2}. The total area was 71.36 km^{2}.

On February 11, 2005, Namino, along with the towns of Aso (former) and Ichinomiya (all from Aso District), was merged to create the city of Aso and no longer exists as an independent municipality.
