= Typhoon Talim (2017) =

Western Pacific typhoon in 2017

Typhoon Talim (Lannie)
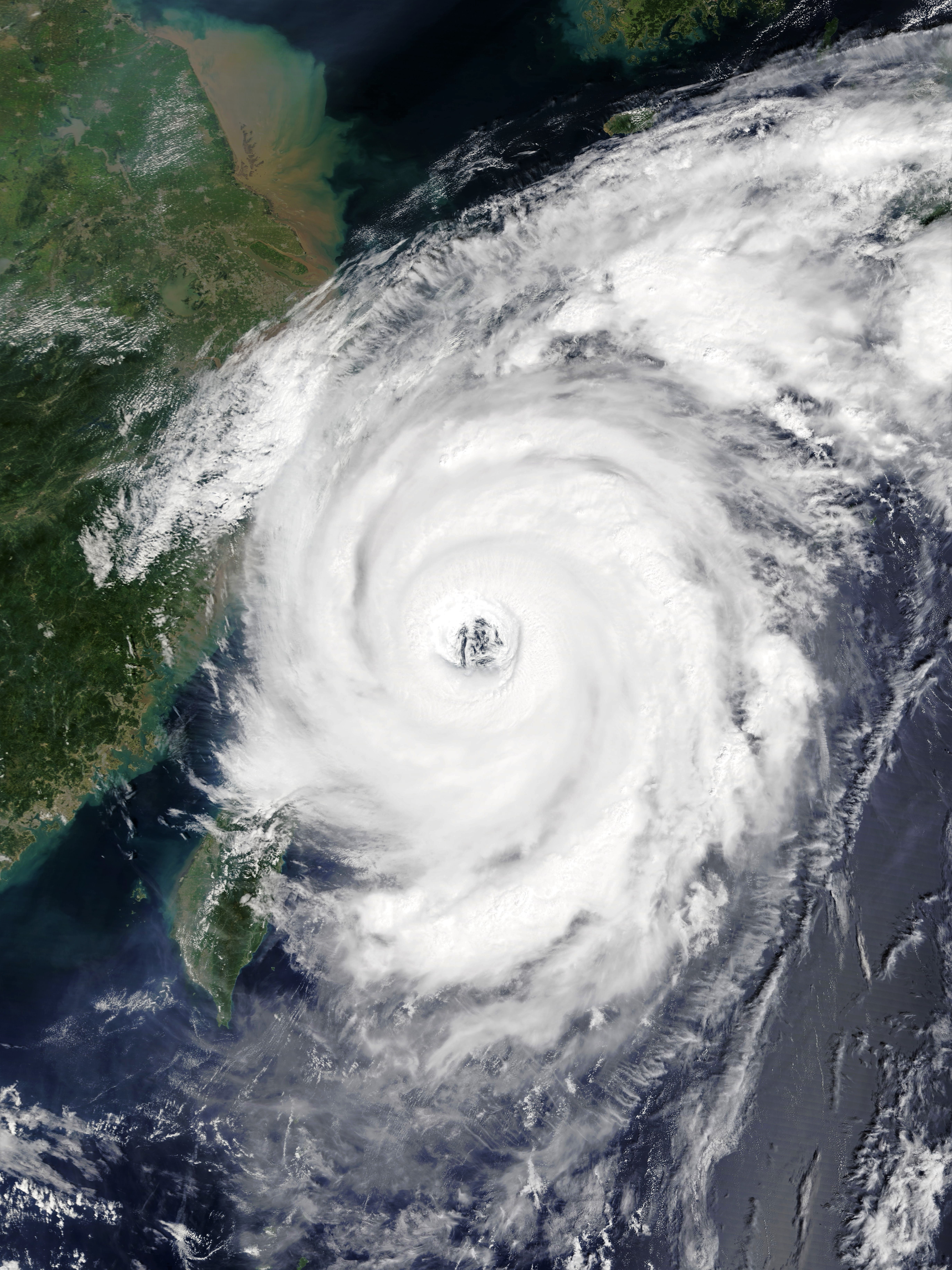
- Talim near at its peak intensity, to the north-northwest of Taiwan on September 14

Meteorological history
- Formed: September 8, 2017
- Extratropical: September 17, 2017
- Dissipated: September 22, 2017

Very strong typhoon
- 10-minute sustained (JMA)
- Highest winds: 175 km/h (110 mph)
- Lowest pressure: 935 hPa (mbar); 27.61 inHg

Category 4-equivalent typhoon
- 1-minute sustained (SSHWS/JTWC)
- Highest winds: 220 km/h (140 mph)
- Lowest pressure: 933 hPa (mbar); 27.55 inHg

Overall effects
- Fatalities: 5 total
- Damage: $750 million (2017 USD)
- Areas affected: Mariana Islands, Philippines, Taiwan, East China, Japan, Kamchatka Peninsula
- IBTrACS
- Part of the 2017 Pacific typhoon season

Typhoon Talim, (Note: The name Talim (Tagalog: talim, [tɐˈlɪm]) was contributed by the Philippines and means "sharp and piercing edge of a blade, cutting point" in Tagalog.) known in the Philippines as Typhoon Lannie, was an intense and destructive tropical cyclone that affected parts of East Asia, especially Japan, during mid-September 2017. The eighteenth named storm and the sixth typhoon of the 2017 Pacific typhoon season, Talim's origins can be traced back to an area of low-pressure that the Joint Typhoon Warning Center first monitored on September 6. The disturbance was upgraded to a tropical depression by the Japan Meteorological Agency only two days later, and it became a tropical storm on September 9, earning the name Talim. Talim grew stronger over the next few days, eventually becoming a typhoon the next day. Within a favorable environment, the typhoon rapidly intensified after passing through the Ryukyu Islands. However, as it moved eastward, Talim started to weaken due to wind shear, and on September 16, it was downgraded to a tropical storm. The storm passed over Japan, near Kyushu the next day, before becoming extratropical on September 18. The extratropical remnants were last noted by the JMA four days later, before dissipating fully on September 22.

In preparations for the typhoon, more than a half a million individuals evacuated in the Japanese islands, and tropical cyclone alerts were raised in the country itself, Taiwan and the eastern portion of China. The NDRRMC in the Philippines also issued bulletins on the system, depicting a possibility of flash floods and landslides in Luzon; however, the typhoon passed safely to the east of the country. 5 deaths were attributed from Talim, all in Japan and caused over $750 million worth of damages over the country.

== Meteorological history ==
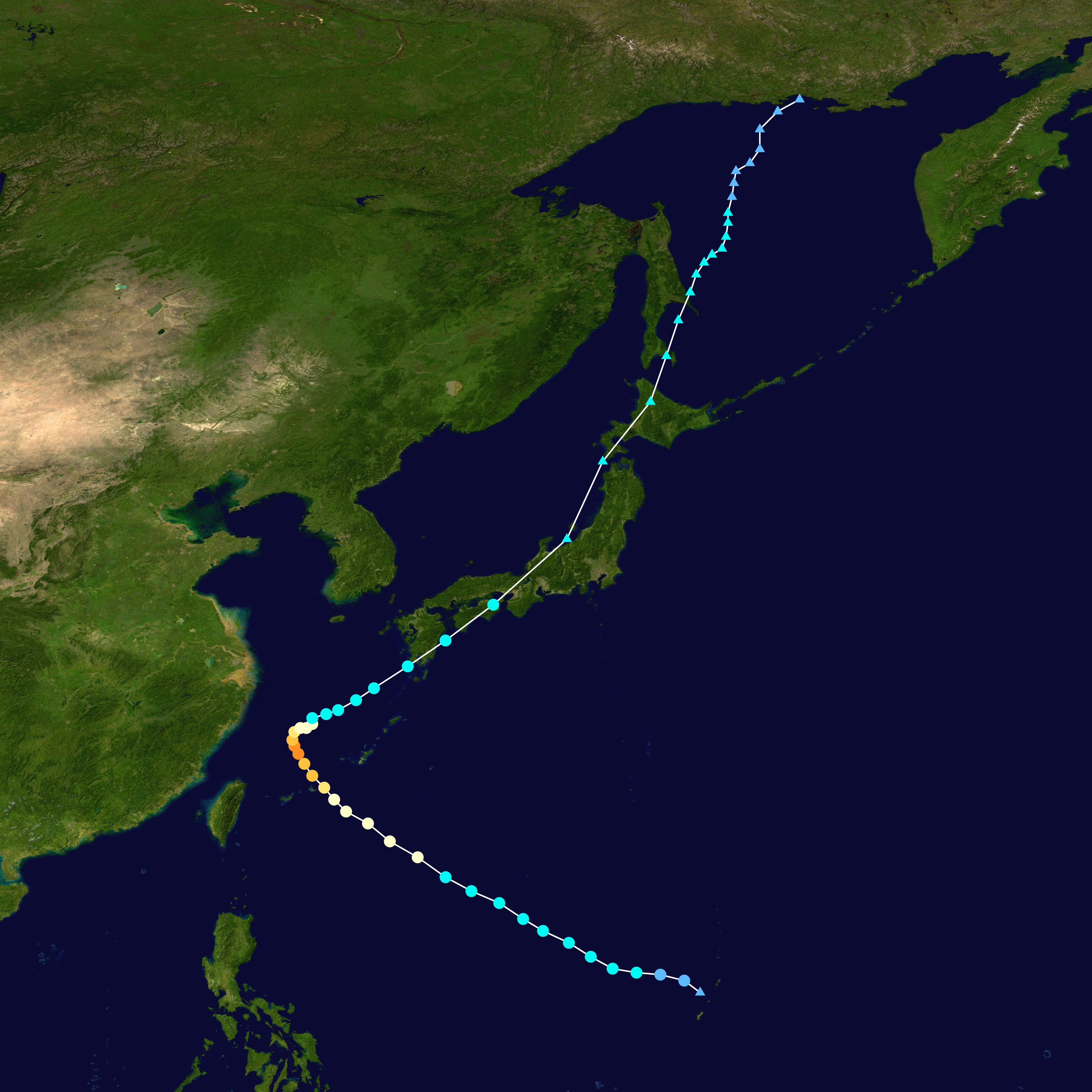
Map plotting the storm's track and intensity, according to the Saffir–Simpson scale Map key Saffir–Simpson scale Tropical depression (≤38 mph, ≤62 km/h) Tropical storm (39–73 mph, 63–118 km/h) Category 1 (74–95 mph, 119–153 km/h) Category 2 (96–110 mph, 154–177 km/h) Category 3 (111–129 mph, 178–208 km/h) Category 4 (130–156 mph, 209–251 km/h) Category 5 (≥157 mph, ≥252 km/h) Unknown Storm type Tropical cyclone Subtropical cyclone Extratropical cyclone, remnant low, tropical disturbance, or monsoon depression

On September 6, the Joint Typhoon Warning Center (JTWC) began monitoring a low pressure area for potential tropical cyclogenesis, under a favorable environment. Two days later, on September 8, the Japan Meteorological Agency (JMA) confirmed the formation of a tropical depression to the southeast of the Mariana Islands. A ridge steered the depression to the northwest to more favorable conditions, including low wind shear, warm sea surface temperatures and good outflow. On the same day, the Joint Typhoon Warning Center (JTWC) followed suit, recognizing it as a tropical depression in their first bulletin. The depression continued intensifying, becoming a tropical storm, early the next day, according to the JMA, and gave the name Talim on the system. The JTWC followed upgrading the system on the afternoon hours of the same day. The next day, it strengthened further to a severe tropical storm in the Philippine Sea.

Talim, rapidly intensifying in the Philippine Sea on September 12

In the early morning hours of September 10, the JMA upgraded the system to a typhoon, with a small eye emerging on the system. Its eye became apparent on satellite images later that day, before Talim entered the Philippine Area of Responsibility, with the PAGASA issuing on their first bulletin, classifying the system as Typhoon Lannie. It passed over the Ryukyu Islands on September 13 as it continued to move to the northwest. Also at that time, Lannie exited the PAR, with the PAGASA issuing their final advisory on the system. Talim reached its peak strength the next day, with sustained winds of about 140 mph (230 km/h) for one minute mean and a minimum pressure of 935 mbar (27.61 inHg). At this time, the typhoon's wind field expanded as far as Shanghai and it featured a large eye. On September 15, Talim began to weaken due to increasing upper-level wind shear, with the typhoon becoming slowly disorganized. It further degraded to a tropical storm as it slowly approached the Japanese Islands, before making landfall near Kyushu on September 17. It crossed the country, before transitioning to an extratropical storm as it entered the Sea of Japan, near Hokkaido on the next day, following with the JTWC and JMA issuing their final warning. It soon hit Sakhalin as a gale-force extratropical storm later that day. The extratropical remnants persisted for four more days before dissipating on September 22, just offshore Magadan Oblast.

== Preparations ==
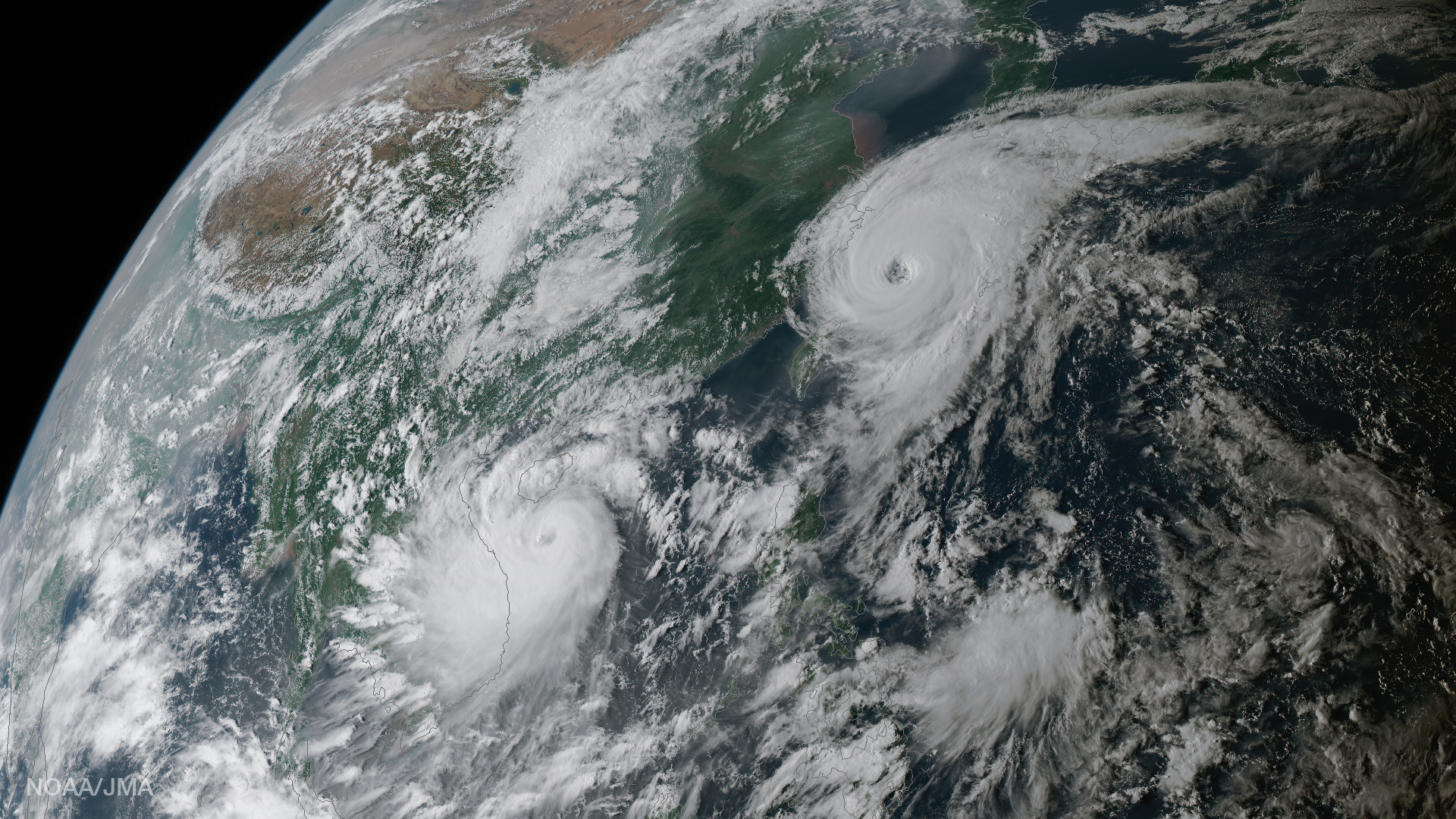
Talim and Doksuri on September 14

=== Philippines ===
As Talim entered the Philippine Area of Responsibility, the PAGASA issued their subsequent bulletins, pinpointing the possibility of the typhoon inducing the southwest monsoon. This may increase risks of flash floods and landslides; however, Talim passed safely to the northeast of the country.

=== East China and Taiwan ===
Blue and orange alerts were issued for parts of China due to the typhoon. Over 200,000 people in Fujian, China and Zheijang provinces were evacuated ahead of Talim. Train tickets were no longer available for purchase in Shanghai due to high demands. Some schools and large sports stadiums were used as shelters for evacuees. Over 2,000 touristbspots and construction sites have been shut down in Zheijang, and over 4,700 boats were towed back to different ports. Trees were also cut down to prevent accidents.

On September 12, a sea warning was issued for eastern Taiwan's coastal waters ahead of the typhoon. Some flights have been canceled, and sandbags have been placed in anticipation of storm surges and flash flooding.

=== Ryukyu Islands and Japan ===
The US Navy began issuing Tropical Cyclone Condition of Readiness alerts for all US bases in Okinawa on September 12. As Talim passes through, high waves are expected across the whole Ryukyu Islands.

More than 640,000 individuals were ordered to evacuate across southern Japan ahead of the typhoon. Over 644 domestic flights were cancelled and other international flights were moved to other days, making the tourists stranded. Some games were also cancelled and/or moved to other dates due to Talim. Warnings were issued at all households regarding the approaching typhoon.

=== Other ===
Local residents and tourists of Primorsky Territory and the Kuril Islands were warned of high waves, heavy rains and gusty winds as Ex-Talim approaches the area.

== Impact ==
5 deaths were reported and over 73 were injured, all in Japan. The total damages were estimated at $750 million (2017 USD).

=== East China and Taiwan ===
Starting on September 13, rough surfs started to impact Taiwan. As the typhoon slowly approached, heavy rain warnings were issued on the northeastern part of the country. Forecasts depicted the possibility of Talim making landfall near Taipei; however, Talim passed to the east of the country. Despite that, rainshowers impacted the northeastern part of the island. Also at that time, lightning was detected on the typhoon at its peak intensity.

Storm surges began to impact the eastern coast of Zhejiang on September 14. As Talim neared, squally rainfall and gusty winds were experienced at the area. However, some residents watch the big waves at the shore in awe.

Fortunately, no damages and deaths were reported at these areas.

=== Ryukyu Islands ===
On the night of September 13, heavy rains and gusty winds started to affect the Ryukyu Islands. As Talim ripped Okinawa, starting on September 13, strong winds uprooted trees and over 20,000 households reported power outages in Miyako. A record 479.04 mm (18.860 in) of rain was observed on September 20 on Miyako-jima Airport for 24 hours. This is the heaviest rain the place suffered, according to the Japan Meteorological Agency (JMA).

=== Japan ===
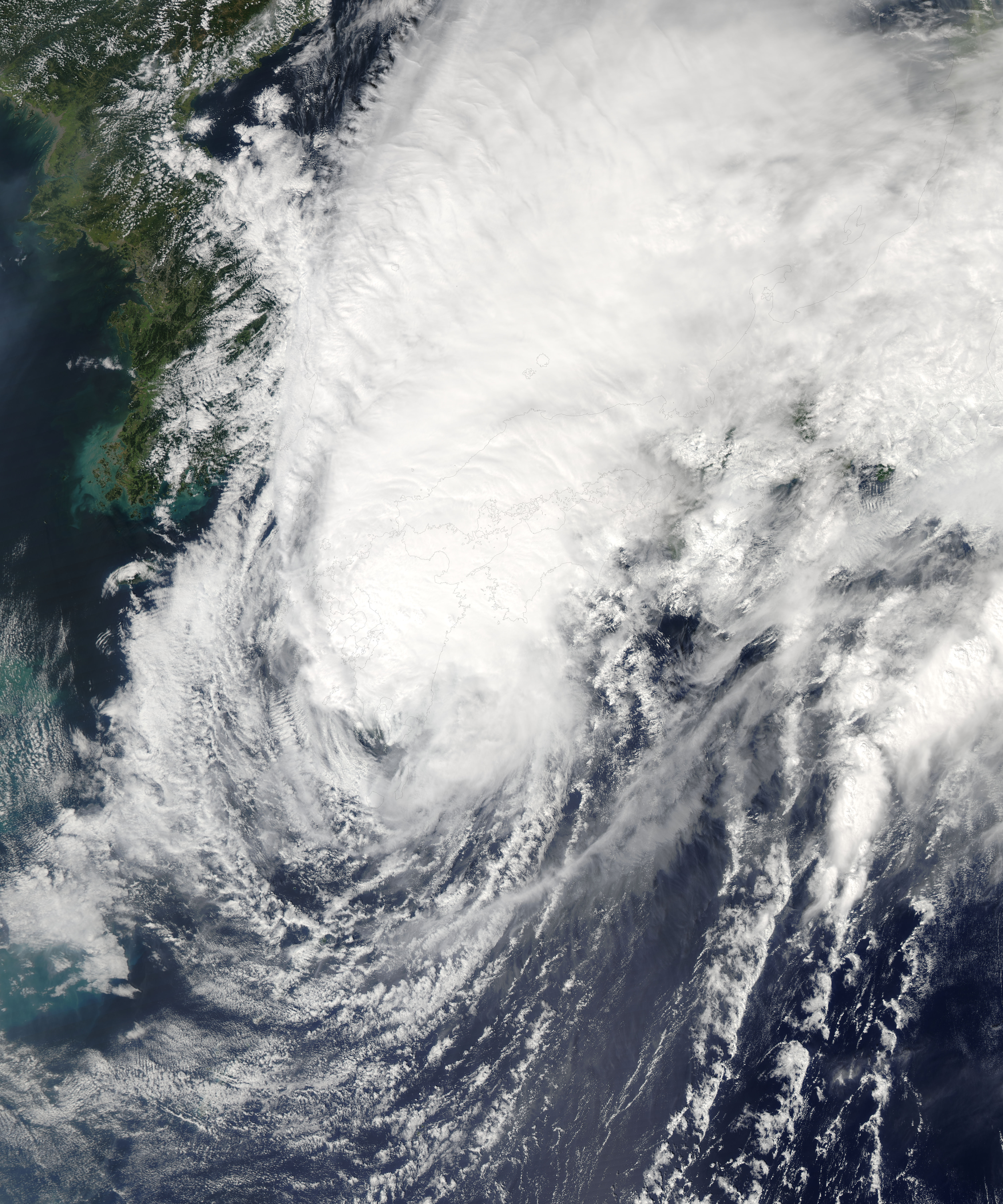
Talim over Japan on September 17

As the typhoon made landfall on Kyushu on the morning of September 17, over 1,400 households in Miyazaki and Kumamoto were affected due to strong winds that downed electrical lines. In the nearby Oita Prefecture, many rivers overflowed, affecting residents from the central to southern parts of the area. The subsequent flooding in urban areas of the prefecture have prompted its governor to issue a disaster relief request. An iron bridge was also washed away at the area. The typhoon also flooded the Tsukumi and Tokuura Rivers in Tsukumi City. There were also damages in Miyazaki Prefecture, including the a village in nearby Kagoshima. On Tokyo, a scaffolding in a construction site collapsed, leading to a power outage of 2,700 households near the area. On Saiki City and Tsukumi City in Oita Prefecture, some residents were trapped in their houses due to flash floods, which were immediately rescued by the authorities. Five homes were entirely destroyed, 615 were partially destroyed, and 804 were partially damaged, according to reports.

The Saeki, Tsukumi, and Usuki railway stations of Nippō Main Line, all in Oita Prefecture, were covered in mud due to the floodings. In addition, a large-scale landslide occurred on the Tokuura signal field while sediment inflow was seen near the place. However, no one was killed. In addition, there was a coastal embarkment from the stations of Kaigantera until the end of the Takuta Station of the Shikoku Railway Company sustained damages. The Yakuri and Kotodenshido stations of the Takamatsu-Kotohira Electric Railroad has its parts collapsed. There were also reports of runoffs in the stations of Kyoto Tango Railway.

5 deaths were attributed to Talim. An 86-year-old woman was found dead on September 17, due to her house pounded by a landslide in Kagawa Prefecture, while on Kōchi Prefecture, a 60-year man drowned in his car, due to a swollen river, and two bodies were recovered from a riverbank. In Oita Prefecture, a 70-year man was recorded missing, before founding him in an unknown place. The last fatality of the storm was reported at Hokkaido, when another man, possibly in his 80s, was found dead in a beach. 73 individuals were injured, in the other hand.

== See also ==
- Weather of 2017
- Tropical cyclones in 2017
- Typhoon Sinlaku (2008)
- Typhoon Jangmi (2008)
- Typhoon Malakas (2016)
- Typhoon Shanshan (2024)
