= Register! =

Japanese manga series

- First tankōbon volume cover

レジスタ！ (Rejisuta!)
- Genre: Romance
- Manga
- Written by: Fujimaru
- Published by: Shogakukan
- Imprint: Shōnen Sunday Comics Special
- Magazine: Monthly Shōnen Sunday
- Original run: September 12, 2024 – present
- Volumes: 3

Register! (Japanese: レジスタ！, Hepburn: Rejisuta!) is a Japanese manga series written and illustrated by Fujimaru. It began serialization in Shogakukan's shōnen manga magazine Monthly Shōnen Sunday in September 2024.

== Synopsis ==
Kazumi Hanada is a 36 year-old freelance lyricist who struggles in writing in love songs. The reason he struggles is due to being betrayed by his fiancée, and his decision afterwards was to never fall in love again. One day, he meets a girl named Jun Shinozaki at a supermarket, and finds himself falling in love.

== Publication ==
Written and illustrated by Fujimaru, Register! began serialization in Shogakukan's shōnen manga magazine Monthly Shōnen Sunday on September 12, 2024. Its chapters have been compiled into three tankōbon volumes as of October 2026.

No.	Release date	ISBN
1	April 11, 2025	978-4-09-854077-8
2	January 9, 2026	978-4-09-854419-6
3	October 9, 2026	978-4-09-854869-9

== Reception ==
The series was ranked second in the Nationwide Publishers Recommended Comics list of 2026. The series was ranked third in the print category at the twelfth Next Manga Awards in 2026.
