= Monthly Shōnen Sunday =

Japanese manga magazine

- First issue cover, featuring characters from Mitsuru Adachi's series Q and A
- Categories: Shōnen manga
- Frequency: Monthly
- Circulation: 7,667; (July–September 2026)
- First issue: June 2009
- Company: Shogakukan
- Country: Japan
- Language: Japanese
- Website: Official website

Monthly Shōnen Sunday (Japanese: 月刊少年サンデー, Hepburn: Gekkan Shōnen Sandē), alternately known as Gessan (ゲッサン) (a portmanteau of "Gekkan" and "Sandē" from its full Japanese title), is a monthly shōnen manga magazine published in Japan by Shogakukan since May 12, 2009 (the June 2009 issue). The magazine was announced in February 2009, with Hayashi Masato, at that time editor of Weekly Shōnen Sunday, editing the monthly magazine as well. Manga artists who debuted new series or stories in the magazine include Yellow Tanabe, Mitsuru Adachi, and Kiyohiko Azuma.

== Series ==
There are 21 manga series being serialized in Monthly Shōnen Sunday.

Series title	Author	Premiered
341 Sentōdan (341戦闘団)	Rei Hiroe	July 2019
Akina-chan Kamigakaru (アキナちゃん神がかる)	Kiminori Wakasugi	September 2023
Amemiya-san (雨宮さん)	Keiichi Arawi	October 2021
Aoi Honō (アオイホノオ)	Kazuhiko Shimamoto	June 2009 (Note: Moved from Weekly Young Sunday)
Asagiro: Asagi Ōkami (アサギロ 〜浅葱狼〜)	Minoru Hiramatsu	June 2009
Be-Kaku (ベー革)	Tetsuro Kuromatsu	September 2021
Blue Planter (ブループランター, Burū Purantā)	Sai Sasano	March 2025
Concealed 17 (コンシールド17, Konshiirudo Sebuntiin)	Kichi Mokano	September 2026
Dai Dark (大ダーク, Dai Dāku)	Q Hayashida	April 2019
Draw This, Then Die! (これ描いて死ね, Kore Kaite Shine)	Minoru Toyoda	December 2021
Heisei Otaku Remembers (平成ヲタク リメンバーズ, Heisei Otaku Rimenbāzu)	Naomichi Io	April 2023
Itsuka Sora kara (いつか宇宙から)	Hiroyuki Nishimori (story), Mifumi Inaba (art)	January 2026
Kitaguni Yurayura Kikō (北国ゆらゆら紀行)	Ryoko Nagara	December 2023
Kyokuhoku no Geroi (極北のゲロイ)	Masasumi Kakizaki	May 2025
Mane Mane Nichi Nichi (マネマネにちにち)	Sōichirō Yamamoto	August 2024
Matinee & Soiree (マチネとソワレ)	Megumi Osuga	December 2016
Mix	Mitsuru Adachi	June 2012
Register! (レジスタ!, Rejisuta!)	Fujimaru	October 2024
Tōdai no Sanshimai (東大の三姉妹)	Yuki Isoya	July 2023
Uchi no Ruka nara (うちのルカなら。)	Yajin Goka	April 2025
Yural Dōbutsuki (ユラル動物記)	Nizo Miura	July 2026

== Finished series ==
=== 2009 ===
- Azumanga Daioh: Supplementary Lessons (あずまんが大王・補習編, Azumanga Daiō Hoshūhen) by Kiyohiko Azuma (June–August 2009)
- Daisan Sekai no Nagai (第三世界の長井) by Ken Nagai (June 2009 – January 2019)
- Gakushin Ō: Vero Musica (楽神王 〜vero musica〜) by Masanori Yoshida (June 2009 – December 2010)
- Kenryoku no Inu Police Wan! (権力の犬、ポリスワン!) by Pero Sugimoto (June 2009 – April 2010)
- Lindbergh (リンドバーグ, Rindobāgu) by Ahndongshik (June 2009 – May 2013)
- Makoto no Ōja: Real Deal Champion (マコトの王者 〜REAL DEAL CHAMPION〜) by Ashibi Fukui (June 2009 – November 2011)
- Manekoi (まねこい) by Taishi Mori (June 2009 – March 2012)
- Nobunaga Concerto (信長協奏曲, Nobunaga Kontseruto) by Ayumi Ishii (June 2009 – October 2026)
- Q and A (QあんどA, Kyū ando Ē) by Mitsuru Adachi (June 2009 – April 2012)
- Shinobi no Kuni (忍びの国) by Ryō Wada (story) and Mutsumi Banno (art) (June 2009 – March 2011)
- The!! Beach Stars (ザ!! ビーチスターズ) by Masahiro Morio (June 2009 – May 2010) (moved from Weekly Young Sunday)
- Tsuki no Hebi: Suikoden Ibun (月の蛇 〜水滸伝異聞〜) by Hiroo Nakamichi (June 2009 – February 2012)
- Welcome to the El-Palacio (ここが噂のエル・パラシオ, Koko ga Uwasa no Eru-Parashio) by Takao Aoyagi (June 2009 – September 2013)
- Yoshitō-sama! (よしとおさま!) by Haruka Shii (June 2009 – August 2015)
- Yvonne to Asobou! (イボンヌと遊ぼう!, Ibon'nu to Asobou!) by Tomoyuki Arai (June 2009 – November 2011)
- Hallelujah Overdrive! (ハレルヤオーバードライブ!, Hareruya Ōbādoraibu!) by Kōtarō Takata (July 2009 – November 2015)
- Itsuka Omae to Jiruba o (いつかおまえとジルバを) by Yūji Yokoyama (August 2009 – August 2011)
- Number One Kaidoh (No.1海童) by Amiya Harumi (August 2009 – May 2010)
- Toaru Hikūshi e no Tsuioku (とある飛空士への追憶) by Koroku Inumura (story) and Maiko Ogawa (art) (September 2009 – March 2011)

=== 2010–2014 ===
- Idol Ace (アイドルA(エース), Aidoru Eisu) by Mitsuru Adachi (November 2010 – August 2011) (moved from Weekly Young Sunday)
- Tetsugaku Letra (鉄楽レトラ, Tetsugaku Retora) by Mizu Sahara (May 2011 – January 2015)
- Hitori Bocchi no Chikyū Shinryaku (ひとりぼっちの地球侵略) by Maiko Ogawa (April 2012 – October 2018)
- After School Dice Club (放課後さいころ倶楽部) by Hirō Nakamichi (April 2013 – July 2021)
- Fudatsuki no Kyōko-chan (ふだつきのキョーコちゃん) by Sōichirō Yamamoto (September 2013 – July 2016)
- Les Misérables by Victor Hugo (original novel) and Takahiro Arai (October 2013 – June 2016)
- Dai-13 Hokenshitsu (第13保健室) by Takao Aoyagi (June 2014 – October 2016)
- The Idolmaster Million Live! (アイドルマスター ミリオンライブ!, Aidoru Nasutā Mirion Raibu!) by Yuki Monji and Bandai Namco Entertainment (August 2014 – October 2016)

=== 2015–2019 ===
- Renjoh Desperado (恋情デスペラード, Renjō Desuperādo) by Ahndongshik (June 2015 – May 2018)
- Misoshiru de Kanpai! (味噌汁でカンパイ!) by Sai Sasano (July 2015 – October 2022) (Note: First launched as a short-term series. It began its regular serialization in the February 2016 issue.)
- Kaiō Dante (海王ダンテ) by Fukurō Izumi and Ryōji Minagawa (January 2016 – September 2021)
- Teasing Master Takagi-san (からかい上手の高木さん, Karakai Jōzu no Takagi-san) by Sōichirō Yamamoto (August 2016 – November 2023) (moved from Monthly Shōnen Sunday Mini)
- Re:Creators One More! (Re:CREATORS わんもあ！, Re Kurieitāzu Wan Moa) by Yūki Kumagai (July–December 2017)
- Koi ni Koisuru Yukari-chan (恋に恋するユカリちゃん) by Sōichirō Yamamoto (original story) and Yūma Suzu (August 2017 – May 2020)
- Kongōji-san wa Mendōkusai (金剛寺さんは面倒臭い) by Minoru Toyoda (October 2017 – August 2020)
- Asoko de Hataraku Musubu-san (あそこではたらくムスブさん) by Taishi Mori (December 2017 – February 2025)
- Dorohedoro (ドロヘドロ) by Q Hayashida (December 2017 – October 2018) (moved from Hibana)
- In the Heart of Kunoichi Tsubaki (くノ一ツバキの胸の内, Kunoichi Tsubaki no Mune no Uchi) by Sōichirō Yamamoto (February 2018 – June 2023)
- Sensei wa Koi wo Oshie Rarenai (先生は恋を教えられない) by Motomi Minamoto (July 2018 – July 2022)
- Bomba Boy (ボンバボーイ, Bonba Bōi) by Seto Mikumo (September 2018 – October 2020)
- Sekai Aruiteru to Dopuna Hito ni Kara Mareru (世界歩いてるとドープな人にカラまれる) by Goka Yajin (November 2018 – January 2021)
- Koroshiya S no Yuragi (殺し屋Sのゆらぎ) by Erika Funamoto (January 2019 – April 2021)
- Pseudo Harem (疑似ハーレム, Giji Hāremu) by Yū Saitō (February 2019 – April 2021)
- School × Tukuru (スクール×ツクール, Sukūru × Tsukūru) by Riki Taoka (story) and wogura (art) (May 2019 – November 2021)
- Kokkyō no Emilia (国境のエミーリャ, Kokkyō no Emīrya) by Kunihiko Ikeda (September 2019 – April 2026)
- Bowing! (ボウイング, Bōingu) by Kyukyupon (October 2019 – October 2022)
- Kowamote Sensei no Oshinagaki (怖面先生のおしながき) by Ryota Akisawa (October 2019 – July 2021)

=== 2020–2024 ===
- Tenohira Sōseiki (てのひら創世記) by Maiko Ogawa (January 2020 – October 2022)
- Yōkina Shimerike (陽気なしめりけ) by Ogi Suzuhito (February 2020 – November 2023)
- Utakata no Minato (ウタカタノミナト) by Keke Kitaya (April 2020 – February 2022)
- Kyō no Sanponta (今日のさんぽんた) by Riki Taoka (May 2020 – February 2026)
- Meiji Koko no Ko (明治ココノコ) by Mutsumi Banno (June 2020 – July 2023)
- Bijutsushitsu no Monsters (美術室のモンスターず, Bijutsushitsu no Monsutāzu) by Tsuchitatsu Suzuki (September 2020 – January 2022)
- AK-69 no Naki Meshi (AK-69の泣きメシ) by Yusuke Matsumoto, AK-69 (November 2020 – May 2022)
- Life Maker by Kōsuke Utsue (April 2021 – August 2023)
- Yakyuu Miyō yo! (やきゅうみようよ!) by Moto Tsujishima (May 2021 – July 2022)
- Pinkaponka (ピンカポンカ) by Emu Eichi (June 2021 – June 2023)
- Chūkō Ikkan!! Sasazuka Kōkō Kosume-bu!! (中高一貫!!笹塚高校コスメ部!!) by Takashi Yoshida (July 2021 – October 2024)
- Kami-sama, Boku wa Kizuite Shimatta (神様、僕は気づいてしまった) by Nanashi Uematsu and Hiroaki Iwaki (original story) (July 2021 – December 2021)
- Nami no Shijima no Horizont (波のしじまのホリゾント) by Maiko Ogawa (August 2021 – March 2026)
- Kujima: Why Sing, When You Can Warble? (クジマ歌えば家ほろろ, Kujima Utaeba Ie Hororo) by Akira Konno (October 2021 – May 2024)
- Kaigai Master to Koko dake no Hanashi (海外マスターとここだけの話) by Gokayajin (December 2021 – August 2022)
- Share House Nile (シェアハウス・ナイル, Shea hausu Nairu) by Hiroo Nakamichi (story) and Megumi Dorokawa (art) (July 2022 – February 2024)
- Kaigai, En ni Makasete Aruku Dake (海外 縁にまかせて歩くだけ。) by Gokayajin (February 2023 – January 2025)
- Mataku no Vermut (魔託のヴァルムト, Mataku no Vuarumuto) by Uematsu Nanashi (May 2023 – September 2025)
- Ano Toki no Kodomo-san (あのときのこどもさん) by Kamentotsu (August 2023 – March 2025)
- E o Kaku Futari (えをかくふたり) by Ippan Nakamura (August 2023 – March 2024)
- Usagi to Takanosu (兎と鷹の巣) by Seto Mikumo (November 2023 – June 2026)
- Karakai Jōzu (?) no Nishikata-san (からかい上手(？)の西片さん) by Sōichirō Yamamoto (story) and Mifumi Inaba (art) (December 2023 – September 2024)
- Bokutachi no Kimochi (ぼくたちのキモチ) by Minato Ayase (January–March 2024)
- Taikai ni Hibiku Kōru (大海に響くコール) by Yuwei (February 2024 – April 2026)
- Atte Taberu to Kakimashite (会って食べると書きまして。) by Kenji Taguchi (September 2024 – February 2025)
- Ōkami Shōnen wa Yoru ni Naku (狼少年は夜に泣く) by Eroku Nagachi (December 2024 – August 2026)

=== 2025–present ===
- Kichijōji Shōnen (吉祥寺少年) by Syun Matsuena (January 2025 – January 2026)
- Kimi no Kiss ga Naiteiru (君のキスが泣いている) by Minato Ayase (June 2025 – April 2026)

== Light novels ==
- Stitches (怪、刺す, Kai, Sasu) written by Hirokatsu Sahara and illustrated by Junji Itō (June 2009–February 2010)
- Time Mail (タイムメール, Taimu Mēru) written by Tōichirō Kujira and illustrated by Hiroto Ōishi (June 2009–May 2010)
