= Shinobi no Kuni =

Japanese novel by Ryō Wada and its manga adaptation

- Novel cover

忍びの国
- Genre: Historical
- Novel
- Written by: Ryō Wada
- Published by: Shinchosha
- Published: May 30, 2008
- Manga
- Written by: Ryō Wada
- Illustrated by: Mutsumi Banno
- Published by: Shogakukan
- Magazine: Monthly Shōnen Sunday
- Original run: May 12, 2009 – February 12, 2011
- Volumes: 5
- Live-action film
- Mumon: The Land of Stealth (2017)
- icon

Shinobi no Kuni (忍びの国; lit. 'The Land of Stealth') is a Japanese novel written Ryō Wada and published by Shinchosha in May 2008. A manga adaptation illustrated by Mutsumi Banno was serialized in Shogakukan's Monthly Shōnen Sunday from May 2009 to February 2011. A live-action film, Mumon: The Land of Stealth, premiered in Japan in July 2017.

== Media ==
=== Novel ===
Ryō Wada's Shinobi no Kuni novel was published by Shinchosha on May 30, 2008.

=== Manga ===
A manga adaptation illustrated by Mutsumi Banno was serialized in Shogakukan's Monthly Shōnen Sunday from May 12, 2009, to February 12, 2011. Shogakukan collected its chapters in four tankōbon volumes, released from December 12, 2009, to March 11, 2011. An additional fifth volume was released by Shogakukan, containing anthology stories that were never serialized, on June 12, 2017. It includes collaboration from Banno, Ashibi Fukui, Kōnosuke Saeki, Hayato Asaki, Hiko and Yuto Sano.

The manga was licensed in Indonesia by Elex Media Komputindo.

==== Volumes ====
No.	Japanese release date	Japanese ISBN
1	December 12, 2009	978-4-09-122108-7
2	April 12, 2010	978-4-09-122237-4
3	September 10, 2010	978-4-09-122558-0
4	March 11, 2011	978-4-09-122739-3
5	June 12, 2017	978-4-09-127723-7

=== Live-action film ===
A live-action film adaptation of the novel, titled Mumon: The Land of Stealth, premiered in Japan on July 1, 2017.
