= Rakura =

Japanese pop singer

- Born: Kinoshita Rakurai (木下楽来); January 26, 2003 (age 23); Fukuoka, Japan
- Genres: J-pop, R&B
- Years active: 2020-
- Label: Asistobe (2022-)
- Website: rakura-official.com/index.html

YouTube information
- Channel: Rakura
- Years active: 2020 -
- Subscribers: 6.16 thousand
- Views: 3.65 million
- Last updated: August 4, 2026

Rakura, (birth name Rakurai Kinoshita (木下楽来, Kinoshita Rakurai), born January 26, 2003, in Japan, is a Japanese pop and R&B singer-songwriter, who made major debut in 2020 and is currently signed under Asistobe label, subsidiaries of B Zone.

== Career ==
In 2019, Rakura won the special jury award at "Kyushu Teen's Audition 2019" held by the B Zone Group. In 2020, she made major debut with the digital single "Unforgiven" released under recording label Asistobe. In 2021, she released her first mini album In me. In 2022, she released her first collaboration single with singer Rainy Shooting star/Find the Truth, which served as an opening theme to the anime television series Case Closed: Zero's Tea Time. Shortly after the release of the collaboration single, she released her first full-length album Tint. In 2023, she has released collaboration singles with hip-hop singers Sanari and Tok10.

== Discography ==
As of the 2023, she has released ten digital singles, one collaboration single, one mini album and one original album.

=== Collaboration singles ===
Title	Album details	Peak chart positions
Title	Album details	JPN Oricon
Shooting Star/Find the Truth	Released: 13 April 2022; Label: B Zone; Formats: CD, digital download, streaming	16

=== Digital singles ===
Year	Single	Reference
2020	"Unforgiven"	
2021	"We Fallin'"	
2021	"Time will tell"	
2021	"Orange soda"	
2022	"Shinjuku no Nekomae"	
2022	"Shooting Star"	
2023	"Outlook (feat.Sanari)"	
2023	"Night Haze"	
2023	"Mada Yoru ni naru Mae ni feat.Tok10" (また夜になる前に)	
2023	"Smashing Time"	
2023	"Weekend Dance"	

=== Albums ===
Title	Album details	Peak chart positions
Title	Album details	JPN Oricon
Tint	Released: 13 April 2023; Label: Asistobe; Formats: CD, cassette tape, digital download, streaming	264

=== Mini Albums ===
Title	Album details	Peak chart positions
Title	Album details	JPN Oricon
In Me	Released: 15 Aprim 2021; Label: Asistobe; Formats: Digital download, cassette Tape	-
