= Beach Stars =

Japanese manga series

- First tankōbon volume cover

ビーチスターズ (Bīchi Sutāzu)
- Genre: Sports
- Manga
- Written by: Masahiro Morio
- Published by: Shogakukan
- Magazine: Weekly Young Sunday (March 8, 2007 – July 31, 2008); YS Special (September 25 – December 25, 2008)
- Original run: March 8, 2007 – December 25, 2008
- Volumes: 7
- Manga

The!! Beach Stars
- Written by: Masahiro Morio
- Published by: Shogakukan
- Magazine: Monthly Shōnen Sunday
- Original run: May 12, 2009 – April 12, 2010
- Volumes: 2

Beach Stars (Japanese: ビーチスターズ, Hepburn: Bīchi Sutāzu) is a Japanese manga series written and illustrated by Masahiro Morio. It was serialized in Shogakukan's seinen manga magazine Weekly Young Sunday from March 2007 to July 2008, when the magazine ceased its publication; it continued in YS Special from September to December 2008. Its chapters were collected in seven tankōbon volumes. A direct sequel, titled The!! Beach Stars, was serialized in Shogakukan's shōnen manga magazine Monthly Shōnen Sunday from May 2009 to April 2010, with its chapters collected in two tankōbon volumes.

== Publication ==
Written and illustrated by Masahiro Morio, Beach Stars was serialized in Shogakukan's seinen manga magazine Weekly Young Sunday from March 8, 2007, to July 31, 2008, when the magazine ceased its publication. The series later ran in YS Special from September 25 to December 25, 2008. (Note: The series finished in YS Special vol.4, released on December 25, 2008.) Shogakukan collected its chapters in seven tankōbon volumes, released from July 5, 2007, to March 30, 2009.

A direct continuation, titled The!! Beach Stars (ザ!!ビーチスターズ, Za!! Bīchi Sutāzu), was serialized in Shogakukan's then-brand-new shōnen manga magazine Monthly Shōnen Sunday from May 12, 2009, to April 12, 2010. Shogakukan collected its chapters in two tankōbon volumes, released on February 12 and June 11, 2010.

The manga was licensed in France by Kurokawa.
