= Mumon: The Land of Stealth =

2008 film by Yoshihiro Nakamura

- Promotional poster
- Directed by: Yoshihiro Nakamura
- Screenplay by: Ryō Wada
- Based on: Shinobi no Kuni by Ryō Wada
- Produced by: Takashi Hirano; Julie K. Fujishima
- Starring: Satoshi Ohno; Satomi Ishihara; Ryohei Suzuki; Yuri Chinen; Yuna Taira; Jun Kunimura; Yūsuke Iseya
- Narrated by: Tsutomu Yamazaki
- Edited by: Soichi Ueno
- Music by: Yu Takami
- Production companies: Tokyo Broadcasting System; Toho; Chubu-Nippon Broadcasting; WOWOW; Mainichi Broadcasting System; TBS Radio; Hokkaido Broadcasting; Nippon Shuppan Hanbai; Shizuoka Broadcasting System; Chugoku Broadcasting; Koei Tecmo Games; J Storm; Twins Japan; TC Entertainment; East Japan Marketing & Communications; KDDI Corporation; RKB Mainichi Broadcasting; GyaO; Yomiuri Shimbun; Tohoku Broadcasting Company; Chunichi Shimbun
- Distributed by: Toho
- Release date: July 1, 2017 (Japan)
- Running time: 125 minutes
- Country: Japan
- Language: Japanese
- Box office: ¥2.51 billion

Mumon: The Land of Stealth (Japanese: 忍びの国, Hepburn: Shinobi no Kuni) is a Japanese jidaigeki film, directed by Yoshihiro Nakamura and based on the novel Shinobi no Kuni by Ryō Wada. For international distribution, the film has been titled Mumon - The Land of Stealth. Set during the Sengoku period, the film focuses on fictional events that take place surrounding the Tenshō Iga War. Mumon: The Land of Stealth was theatrically released in Japan by Toho on July 1, 2017. The theme song for the film is "Tsunagu (つなぐ, Bond)" by the Japanese group Arashi.

== Plot ==
The warlord, Nobunaga Oda, is rapidly vanquishing his foes on a quest to pacify and unify the country under his rule. However, there is one region that even Nobunaga fears: The Iga Province, home to the Iga ninja, known to be extraordinary weapons of war who do not think of people as human and will assassinate anyone for money. There is one Iga ninja, Mumon, who is renowned as a deadly assassin and who has unmatched battle strength, earning him the nickname of Iga's strongest ninja. However, he is equally lazy and only seeks to earn money to please his wife, Okuni. At the same time, a ninja named Heibee Shimoyama becomes disillusioned with his people's way of living.

One day, Mumon kills a ninja from a different family for a reward, unaware that his actions will ultimately lead to a deadly battle between Nobunaga's army and the ninja of the Iga Province. The resulting battle evokes struggles with morality in a midst of colliding interests and political schemes.

== Cast ==
- Satoshi Ohno as Mumon
- Satomi Ishihara as Okuni
- Ryohei Suzuki as Heibee Shimoyama
- Yūsuke Iseya as Daizen Heki
- Yuri Chinen as Nobukatsu Oda
- Yuna Taira as Rin Kitabatake
- Makita Sports as Sakyonosuke Nagano
- Tatekawa Danshun as Sandayu Momoji
- Jun Kunimura as Tomonori Kitabatake
- Denden as Kai Shimoyama
- Shinnosuke Mitsushima as Jirobe Shimoyama
- Kitaro as Hanroku Otowa

== Production ==
The film was announced on May 31, 2016. Filming began in July 2016 and finished in October 2016. Director Nakamura commented that Ohno is an excellent fit for the role of Mumon, who has an unconventional way of thinking. The two previously worked together for the film adaptation of Kaibutsu-kun the Movie in 2011.

In preparation for his role as Mumon, Ohno took intensive training in sword fighting, specifically dagger fighting techniques using both hands. Suzuki, who plays Heibee Shimoyama, also underwent rigorous training to prepare for his role as a skilled ninja.

== Release ==
Mumon: The Land of Stealth had its Japan premiere on May 31, 2017, with Director Nakamura and the main cast in attendance. Its theatrical release in Japan was on July 1, 2017.

The film was also shown at the 20th Shanghai International Film Festival, held from June 17 to June 26, during the Jackie Chan Action Movie Week. In addition, the film had its North American debut at the Toronto Japanese Film Festival on June 28, 2017, as well as its US premiere at the Japan Cuts film festival in New York City on July 13, 2017. Director Nakamura was in attendance at both screenings to introduce the film and answer audience questions. The film will have its Quebec premiere at the Fantasia International Film Festival on July 30, 2017.

== Reception ==
=== Box office ===
The film performed well on its opening weekend, mobilizing 404,452 people nationwide and generating a box office revenue of $4,286,405 (approximately ¥485 million). At the time of release, this was reported to be the most successful opening weekend of the year for Japanese live action films.
