= Misoshiru de Kanpai! =

Japanese manga series by Sai Sasano

- First tankōbon volume cover

味噌汁でカンパイ!
- Genre: Cooking; Romantic comedy
- Manga
- Written by: Sai Sasano
- Published by: Shogakukan
- Imprint: Shōnen Sunday Comics Special
- Magazine: Monthly Shōnen Sunday
- Original run: June 12, 2015 – September 12, 2022
- Volumes: 14
- icon

Misoshiru de Kanpai! (味噌汁でカンパイ!; "Cheers with Miso Soup!") is a Japanese manga series written and illustrated by Sai Sasano. It was serialized in Shogakukan's Monthly Shōnen Sunday from June 2015 to September 2022, with its chapters collected in 14 tankōbon volumes.

== Publication ==
Written and illustrated by Sai Sasano, Misoshiru de Kanpai! was first launched as a short-term story of the series in Shogakukan's Monthly Shōnen Sunday from June 12 to October 10, 2015. The series began its regular serialization in the same magazine on January 12, 2016, and finished on September 12, 2022. Shogakukan collected its chapters in 14 tankōbon volumes, released from January 12, 2016, to November 10, 2022.

=== Volumes ===
No.	Japanese release date	Japanese ISBN
1	January 12, 2016	978-4-09-127006-1
2	July 12, 2016	978-4-09-127349-9
3	January 12, 2017	978-4-09-127472-4
4	August 10, 2017	978-4-09-127728-2
5	February 9, 2018	978-4-09-128154-8
6	July 12, 2018	978-4-09-128401-3
7	March 12, 2019	978-4-09-129084-7
8	August 8, 2019	978-4-09-129360-2
9	February 12, 2020	978-4-09-129569-9
10	September 11, 2020	978-4-09-850238-7
11	April 12, 2021	978-4-09-850494-7
12	October 12, 2021	978-4-09-850742-9
13	April 12, 2022	978-4-09-851065-8
14	November 10, 2022	978-4-09-851374-1
