= Q Hayashida =

Japanese manga artist

Q Hayashida 林田 球
- Born: 1977 (age 48–49) Tokyo, Japan
- Area: Manga artist
- Notable works: Dorohedoro; Dai Dark

Q Hayashida (林田 球, Hayashida Kyū; born 1977) is the pen name of a Japanese manga artist. She is best known for her series Dorohedoro, which was formerly serialized in Monthly Ikki, but moved to Hibana after Ikki ceased publication, and later moved to Monthly Shōnen Sunday after Hibana ceased publication. It was formerly serialized in English on Viz Media's SigIKKI site.

Throughout her artwork, Hayashida uses a variety of artistic tools and media, including paint and textiles. She is known for her attention to detail and technical skill, as well as balancing horror and comedy in her stories.

== Personal life ==
Q Hayashida was born in Tokyo, Japan, and studied oil painting at Tokyo University of the Arts before becoming a manga artist.

She has discussed her childhood and artistic inspirations in interviews but maintains a high level of privacy about her personal life, to the point that her true name and face are unknown.

== Career ==
Hayashida's career began in 1997, when she came in second place in Monthly Afternoon's seasonal award competition with Sofa-chan, an original one-shot about a female ghost living in a couch. Following this, Hayashida wrote and illustrated Maken X Another, an adaptation of the 1999 video game Maken X that was published in Monthly Magazine Z. During this time, she started her own series in Dorohedoro, which gained a popular anime adaptation before ending in 2018. Her next manga series, Dai Dark, began in 2019 and is currently published by Shogakukan's shōnen manga magazine Monthly Shōnen Sunday.

From 2020–2022, a travelling exhibition of Hayashida's artwork spanning the past 20 years was held in Tokyo, with the final exhibition featuring over 400 original art pieces. These included mixed media pieces, videos of her drawing process, and original manuscripts of Dorohedoro and Dai Dark.

== Works ==
- Sofa-chan (1997) one-shot; came in 2nd place for Monthly Afternoon's seasonal award
- Maken X Another (1999–2001) re-released in 2008 as Maken X Another Jack
- Dorohedoro (2000–2018) adapted into an anime in 2020
- Huvahh (2011) one-shot manga prequel for the video game Shadows of the Damned (also created the enemy designs)
- Underground Underground (2012) one-shot inside 138°E artbook
- Hanshin Tigers Sousetsu 80 Shuunen Kinen Zoukan (2015) took part in an anthology manga in honor of the Hanshin Tigers baseball team
- Dai Dark (2019–present) nominated for the print media category of the 2022 Next Manga Award
