= Sensei wa Koi o Oshie Rarenai =

Japanese manga series

- First tankōbon volume cover

先生は恋を教えられない
- Genre: Romantic comedy
- Manga
- Written by: Motomi Minamoto
- Published by: Shogakukan
- Magazine: Monthly Shōnen Sunday
- Original run: June 12, 2018 – June 10, 2022
- Volumes: 7
- icon

Sensei wa Koi o Oshie Rarenai (先生は恋を教えられない; lit. 'Teacher Can't Teach Love') is a Japanese manga series written and illustrated by Motomi Minamoto. It was serialized in Shogakukan's shōnen manga magazine Monthly Shōnen Sunday from June 2018 to June 2022, with its chapters collected in seven tankōbon volumes.

== Publication ==
Written and illustrated by Motomi Minamoto, Sensei wa Koi o Oshie Rarenai was serialized in Shogakukan's shōnen manga magazine Monthly Shōnen Sunday from June 12, 2018, to June 10, 2022. Shogakukan collected its chapters in seven tankōbon volumes, released from June 12, 2019, to September 12, 2022.

=== Volumes ===
No.	Japanese release date	Japanese ISBN
1	June 12, 2019	978-4-09-129270-4
2	September 12, 2019	978-4-09-129407-4
3	March 12, 2020	978-4-09-850035-2
4	November 12, 2020	978-4-09-850321-6
5	May 12, 2021	978-4-09-850564-7
6	December 10, 2021	978-4-09-850823-5
7	September 12, 2022	978-4-09-851275-1
