= Asoko de Hataraku Musubu-san =

Japanese manga series

- First tankōbon volume cover, featuring Musubu Kondo

あそこではたらくムスブさん
- Genre: Romantic comedy
- Manga
- Written by: Taishi Mori
- Published by: Shogakukan
- Imprint: Monthly Shōnen Sunday Comics
- Magazine: Monthly Shōnen Sunday
- Original run: November 10, 2017 – January 10, 2025
- Volumes: 7
- icon

Asoko de Hataraku Musubu-san (あそこではたらくムスブさん; lit. 'Musubu, the Girl Working There') is a Japanese manga series written and illustrated by Taishi Mori. It was serialized in Shogakukan's Monthly Shōnen Sunday from November 2017 to January 2025, with its chapters collected in seven tankōbon volumes.

== Plot ==
The story revolves around Goro Sagami (砂上 吾郎, Sagami Gōro), a 24-year-old man who starts working in Shonan Rubber Industry Co., Ltd. (湘南ゴム工業株式会社, Shōnan Gomu Kōgyō Kabushikigaisha), a condom company. Sagami is assigned to the Sales Planning Office and meets Musubu Kondo (近藤 結, Kondō Musubu), a young scientist of the General Development Department. Sagami harbors feelings for Musubu, who is initially too focused on her work to return them.

== Publication ==
Written and illustrated by Taishi Mori, Asoko de Hataraku Musubu-san was serialized in Shogakukan's Monthly Shōnen Sunday from November 10, 2017, to January 10, 2025. Shogakukan collected its chapters in seven tankōbon volumes, released from October 12, 2018, to February 12, 2025.

=== Volumes ===
No.	Japanese release date	Japanese ISBN
1	October 12, 2018	978-4-09-128629-1
2	November 12, 2019	978-4-09-129466-1
3	December 11, 2020	978-4-09-850347-6
4	December 10, 2021	978-4-09-850846-4
5	December 12, 2022	978-4-09-851440-3
6	December 12, 2023	978-4-09-853042-7
7	February 12, 2025	978-4-09-853854-6

== Reception ==
The manga was one of 50 nominees for the sixth Next Manga Awards in the print category in 2020. It was ranked tenth in the same category in the 2023 edition.
