= Kyō no Asuka Show =

Japanese manga series

- Manga volume 1 cover

今日のあすかショー
- Genre: Comedy; Slice of life
- Manga
- Written by: Taishi Mori
- Published by: Shogakukan
- Magazine: Monthly Big Comic Spirits
- Original run: August 27, 2009 – July 27, 2013
- Volumes: 4
- Original net animation
- Directed by: Masashi Kudo
- Music by: Tomoki Kikuya
- Studio: Silver Link
- Released: August 2, 2012 – January 5, 2013
- Runtime: 3 minutes
- Episodes: 20

Kyō no Asuka Show (Japanese: 今日のあすかショー, Hepburn: Kyō no Asuka Shō; "Today's Asuka Show") is a Japanese manga series written and illustrated by Taishi Mori. It was serialized in Shogakukan's seinen manga magazine Monthly Big Comic Spirits from August 2009 to July 2013, with its chapters compiled in four tankōbon volumes.

A 20-episode 3-minute original net animation (ONA) series adaptation was released between August 2012 and January 2013.

== Plot ==
Asuka Kyōno is a pretty but extremely clueless high school girl who has a knack for bringing herself into embarrassing, erotic-themed situations without herself noticing.

== Characters ==
Asuka Kyōno (京野あすか, Kyōno Asuka)
Voiced by: Arisa Noto
Asuka's father
Voiced by: Keiji Fujiwara
Mao Sawada (沢田麻央, Sawada Mao)
Voiced by: Kaori Furukawa

== Media ==
=== Manga ===
written and illustrated by Taishi Mori, Kyō no Asuka Show was serialized in Shogakukan's Monthly Big Comic Spirits from August 27, 2009, to July 27, 2013. Shogakukan compiled its chapters into four tankōbon volumes, released from August 12, 2010, to September 30, 2013.

==== Volumes ====
No.	Japanese release date	Japanese ISBN
1	August 12, 2010	978-4-06-382248-9
2	September 30, 2011	978-4-09-184109-4
3	September 28, 2012	978-4-09-184717-1; 978-4-09-159127-2 (SE)
4	September 30, 2013	978-4-09-185490-2

=== Original net animation ===
In June 2012, an original net animation (ONA) was announced by Monthly Big Comic Spirits. The ONA is produced by Silver Link and directed by Masashi Kudo. 20 episodes of 3 minutes each were launched from August 3, 2012, to January 5, 2013. It was later broadcast on AT-X and released on two Blu-ray sets on March 26, 2014.
