= Dai Dark =

Japanese manga series by Q Hayashida

- First tankōbon volume cover, featuring Zaha Sanko

大ダーク (Dai Dāku)
- Genre: Dark comedy; Dark fantasy; Science fiction
- Manga
- Written by: Q Hayashida
- Published by: Shogakukan
- English publisher: NA: Seven Seas Entertainment
- Imprint: Monthly Shōnen Sunday Comics
- Magazine: Monthly Shōnen Sunday
- Original run: March 12, 2019 – present
- Volumes: 9
- icon

Dai Dark (Japanese: 大ダーク, Hepburn: Dai Dāku; lit. 'Big Dark') is a Japanese manga series written and illustrated by Q Hayashida. It has been serialized in Shogakukan's shōnen manga magazine Monthly Shōnen Sunday since March 2019, with its chapters collected into nine tankōbon volumes as of October 2025. The manga is licensed for English release in North America by Seven Seas Entertainment.

== Synopsis ==
=== Setting ===
Taking place in outer space, which is divided between a "Regular Realm" and a "Dark Realm". The regular world is inhabited by two races: Aliens (also translated as 'Spacelings'), who are any type of organic humanoid; and Robos, a mix of mechanical humanoids and remote-controlled puppets. Regular Space is occupied by both neutral and hostile ships, with neutral ships often sustaining themselves by carrying and selling cargo under threat of attack from hostile bandit ships; the remnants of bandit attacks, plundered and destroyed ships drifting through space, commonly litter certain routes. Neutral ships include Great Trees, children's school ships run by Solar Mass' automated light-powered robots, and the Maltekya, merchant ships staffed by lobotomized remote-controlled aliens that avoid attacks by self-destructing with little provocation.

The closest sense of order or lawfulness is the theocratic dictatorship, the Solar Mass (also translated as 'Photosfere'), a series of ancient religious sects based around light magic and rumored to stem from a mysterious location named Zora. While all followers of the religion are dedicated to researching light magic and combating darkness, the faith has splintered into multiple competing sub-sects like The Light Head, who all ultimately serve their own interests. The church's higher-ranking members have managed to extend their lives to the point of being multiple centuries old, essentially living in a state of undeath through light magic and cybernetics powered by it. The church is also responsible for running multiple educational colonies for children, protected and maintained entirely by automated light-powered robots.

Meanwhile, the Dark Realm (or the "World of Darkness") is only accessible to dark beings and must be reached by passing through a black hole or equally lightless area. Dark races include dark aliens, hollow but sentient entities dubbed 'Packages' and other dark creatures of varying intelligence, some of whom possess unique powers. The World of Darkness is completely non-visible to regular beings as even light cannot exist within it, resulting in the followers of Light fearing and hunting dark beings, labeling them as Daemons. Regular entities are unable to tolerate the Dark Realms, which physically and mentally warps them into shadow creatures. The Dark Realm contains unusual technologies, including Skin of Darkness robes which use shadows to protect the wearer, and Dark Cores that can provide power and life to ship entities. A common currency with merchants of Darkness is alien bones, which can be traded for dark magic and dark supplies.

=== Premise ===
Zaha Sanko, a dark alien teen with a mysterious past, lives as a vagrant and fugitive to avoid capture; a legend claims that possessing his bones will grant the owner any wish they desire, resulting in most aliens being hostile towards him. Travelling with his guardian and "Package of Darkness" Avakian, the duo are seeking the person offering wishes for his bones. The pair regularly crosses paths with Shimada Death, another dark alien feared as the God of Death, who commonly feeds off the corpses they create. Evading a series of attacks and using the skeletons to purchase equipment, Sanko uses a Black Core to create a sentient ship named Moja, which also leads Shimada to join their crew. This then later expands to include Hajime Damemaru, another fugitive pursued by the Solar Mass.

== Characters ==
Zaha Sanko (ザハ=サンコ)
A teenage alien whose bones are rumored to grant any wish, making him a perpetual target. To protect him, Avakian enrolled him in a Solar Mass learning colony under the pseudonym "Meatball Spaghetti". Despite the constant threats and his frequent encounters with death, Sanko remains optimistic and friendly. He considers the skeletal being Shimada Death a friend. Sanko defends himself using his innate durability, a malleable shadow robe called the Skin of Darkness (闇の皮, Yami no Kawa), and a bone axe named Flesh of Darkness (闇の肉, Yami no niku) that cleanly strips flesh from bone.
Avakian (アバキアン, Abakian)
The Package of Darkness (闇のニーモツ, Yami no Nīmotsu), Avakian is a giant skeleton who acts as Zaha's guardian. He possesses significant internal storage and can reconfigure his skeletal structure, often disguising himself as a novelty backpack to avoid detection. Despite a sinister appearance, he is kind and nurturing towards Sanko, though highly mistrustful of Shimada Death. Avakian's body is covered in a transparent film called the Flesh of Darkness (闇の肉, Yami no Niku), which can mimic body parts precisely enough to fool biometric scanners. He is also capable of Flame Emission (火炎放射, Kaen Hōsha), exhaling intense, non-flammable flames.
Shimada Death (死ま田=デス, Shimada Desu)
The God of Death (死神, Shinigami), Shimada is a flippant entity who feeds on "death", which manifests as spiritual clouds resembling fried chicken. Routinely crossing paths with Zaha since his childhood, Shimada has no interest in his wish-granting bones, leading to a relationship Zaha considers a friendship. While insisting the arrangement is purely symbiotic, Shimada develops an attachment, occasionally saving his life. Shimada claims immortality, can teleport, and can cause death or explosive disintegration with a touch. Possessing the ability to sense death from a distance and preemptively, Shimada can also identify a being's age by sight.
Hajime Damemaru (一=ダメ丸, Hajime Damemaru)
A fugitive from the Solar Mass whose path crosses with Zaha's. Initially attempting to steal his bones to wish for a new name, he instead joins the group, sharing a mutual interest in opposing their common enemy. He is protected by a chitinous armor suit named Naghul'n (ナグールン, Nagurun). Despite being the only non-dark entity, Damemaru is immortal and possesses potent regenerative abilities, allowing him to recover from fatal injuries and develop resistances to previously harmful substances. He can also hypnotize others through prolonged eye contact. He claims to be sixteen, though his appearance suggests adulthood and his true age remains undeterminable.
Moja (モージャ, Mōja)
A clay golem quadruped with a dog skull head, powered by a Dark Core that functions as Zaha's sentient ship. A portable duplicate of a larger vessel, it provides the group with both transportation and counsel. As a dark creature, Moja survives within dark space, and its interior exudes enough dark energy to dissolve non-dark entities.

== Publication ==
Written and illustrated by Q Hayashida, Dai Dark started in Shogakukan's shōnen manga magazine Monthly Shōnen Sunday on March 12, 2019. Shogakukan has collected its chapters into individual tankōbon volumes. The first volume was published on November 12, 2019. As of October 10, 2025, nine volumes have been released.

In July 2020, Seven Seas Entertainment announced that they have licensed the manga for an English language release in North America. The first volume was published on April 27, 2021. In August 2025, Seven Seas Entertainment announced a three-in-one omnibus edition, with the first volume scheduled for March 2026.

=== Volumes ===
No.	Original release date	Original ISBN	English release date	English ISBN
1	November 12, 2019	978-4-09-129486-9	April 27, 2021	978-1-64827-116-8
Bone 1. "Bloodbath Wanderer" (血だるま漂流者, Chi Daruma Hyōryū-sha); Bone 2. "Fireball Mad Ax" (火だるまマッドアックス, Hi Daruma Maddo Akkusu); Bone 3. "Galactic School Days" (銀河スクールデイズ, Ginga Sukūrudeizu); Bone 4. "Allow Me to Kill You" (殺すんデス, Korosun desu); Bone 5. "So Dark It's Scary" (怖いくらいの闇の中, Kowai Kurai no Yami no Naka); Bone 6. "The Hateful Four" (ヘイトフル・フォー, Heitofuru Fō); "Bonus Bone 1"
2	August 12, 2020	978-4-09-850215-8	July 6, 2021	978-1-64827-267-7
Bone 7. "Marutech Kaimono Kikou" (マルテクヤマル秘買い物紀行, Maruteku Yamaru Hi Kaimono Kikō); Bone 8. "Bathroom Conference of Little Shits" (害悪たちのトイレ会議, Gaiaku-tachi no Toire Kaigi); Bone 9. "The Failson Show" (てんでダメ丸ショー, Tende Damemaru Shō); Bone 10. "Treepod Adventure" (コボク・アドベンチャー, Koboku Adobenchā); Bone 11. "Meat Meet" (肉片(ミート)・遭遇(ミート), Mīto Mīto); Bone 12. "Bloody Blossom Boy" (錯乱ボーイ, Sakuran Bōi); "Bonus Bone 2"
3	April 12, 2021	978-4-09-850496-1	December 14, 2021	978-1-64827-367-4
Bone 13. "Inside Lighthead" (インサイド・ライトヘッド, Insaido Raitoheddo); Bone 14. "Lighhead's Dark Side" (ライトヘッド・ダークサイド, Raitoheddo Dāku Saido); Bone 15. "How Much for That Damemaru" (ダメ丸ハウマッチ, Damemaru Hau Matchi); Bone 16. "Bone Improvement" (暗黒しっくり模様替え, Ankoku Shikkuri Moyōgae); Bone 17. "Ow Ticka Ow Ow" (チック痛っく, Chikku Itakku); Bone 18. "Fear of Failure" (ダメコンプレックス, Dame Konpurekkusu); "Bonus Bone 3"
4	November 12, 2021	978-4-09-850799-3	August 2, 2022	978-1-63858-379-0
Bone 19. "Made in Light" (メイド・イン・光, Meido in Hikari); Bone 20. "The Core" (ザ・核(コア), Za Koa); Bone 21. "The Sky, the Earth, and the Light Core Human" (空と大地と光核人間, Sora to Daichi to Hikari Kaku Ningen); Bone 22. "Nyu Hyu Hyu! Pool! Open!" (ニュヒュヒュ! プール開き!, Nyu Hyu Hyu! Pūru-biraki!); Bone 23. "Shining Forehead" (光る額, Hikaru Gaku); Bone 24. "My Fair Package" (マイ フェア ニーモツ, Mai Fea Nīmotsu); "Bonus Bone 4"
5	August 10, 2022	978-4-09-851251-5	March 28, 2023	978-1-63858-825-2
Bone 25. "Black Market" (闇アルバイター, Yami Arubaitā); Bone 26. "Brained by the Hanged Man" (大！脳！ハングドマン, Dai! Nō! Hangudo Man); Bone 27. "The Catacombs of Memory" (根ほり葉ほりメモリー, Nehori Hahori Memorī); Bone 28. "A New Light" (新たなる光, Aratanaru Hikari); Bone 29. "Haunted Hunt" (きもだめ死死死, Kimodame Shi Shi Shi); Bone 30. "Mount Tsurugi Day" (Mt.ツルギ デイ, Mt. Tsurugi Dei); "Bonus Bone 5"
6	April 12, 2023	978-4-09-852022-0	December 5, 2023	978-1-68579-563-4
Bone 31. "Many Dead Pointy-Heads" (尖り狩り, Togari Gari); Bone 32. "Prism of Hell" (骨ヘル三角柱, Hone Heru Sankakuchū); Bone 33. "Burnt Real Bad" (コンガリー悪, Kongarī Aku); Bone 34. "The Invincible Zaha Shimada" (無敵! ザハ死ま田, Muteki! Zaha Shimada); Bone 35. "Love and Intrigue Set Sail" (愛と策謀の旅立ち, Ai to Sakubō no Tabidachi); Bone 36. "Fleshy Flaying" (憎肉球, Niku Nikudama); Bone 37. "Bone Brouhaha" (骨騒動, Hone Sōdō); "Bonus Bone 6"
7	January 12, 2024	978-4-09-853096-0	August 27, 2024	979-8-89160-628-9
Bone 38. "Dark, Light, Grey Zone" (闇、光、グレーゾーン, Yami, Hikari, Gurē Zōn); Bone 39. "Slurp Slurp, Clatter Clatter, Splash Splash" (ズズズズガラガラベッシャベシャ, Zuzuzuzu Garagara Bessha Besha); Bone 40. "Jelly Nightmare" (ゼリーナイトメア, Zerī Naitomea); Bone 41. "U • K • A - Emergence" (U・K・A(ウカ), Uka); Bone 42. "14 – 11" (14-11); Bone 43. "Snake Work" (蛇仕事, Hebi Shigoto); Bone 44. "This Is the Damema-Room" (これが、ダメまルーム, Kore ga, Damema Rūmu); "Bonus Bone 7"
8	October 11, 2024	978-4-09-853641-2	April 29, 2025	979-8-89373-259-7
Bone 45. "What Happened to the Savage?" (未開人はどこに消えたのか？, Mikai Hito wa Doko ni Kieta no ka?); Bone 46. "Fake Fragility" (弱弱擬態, Yowa Yowa Gitai); Bone 47. "Black Tremors" (黒色トレマーズ, Kokushoku Toremāzu); Bone 48. "An Everyman with an Appetite" (ハラペコ一般男性, Harapeko Ippan Dansei); Bone 49. "Armor on Armor" (アーマー on アーマー, Āmā on Āmā); Bone 50. "What's Damemaru" (What's ダメ丸, What's Damemaru); Bone 51. "We Met in the Darkness" (出逢いは闇の中, Deai wa Yami no Naka); "Bonus Bone 8"
9	October 10, 2025	978-4-09-854278-9	April 28, 2026	979-8-89561-665-9
Bone 52. "Dark Appetite" (暗黒食欲, Ankoku Shokuyoku); Bone 53. "Tons of Sanko" (サンコがいっぱい, Sanko ga Ippai); Bone 54. "Evil Evil Restive Horse Girl" (邪邪ウマムスメ, Jaja uma Musume); Bone 55. "Fine Trip, Dark Mood" (いい旅闇気分, Ī Tabi Yami Kibun); Bone 56. "Newborn" (ぼ〜ん・ニューボーン, Bon Nyūbōn); Bone 57. "Eye Care" (瞳にご用心, Hitomi ni Goyōshin); Bone 58. "The Rookie IV" (ルーキーⅣ, Rūkī Ⅳ); Bone 59. "Express Darkness Home Delivery" (クラヤミ宅配便, Kurayami Takuhaibin); "Bonus Bone 9"
10	December 11, 2026	978-4-09-855054-8	—	—

=== Chapters not yet in tankōbon format ===
- Bone 60. Exciting Throwback (トキメキスロウバック, Tokimeki Suroubakku)
- Bone 61. Circling • Triangle • Square (まわる・さんかく・しかく, Mawaru-san Kaku Shikaku)
- Bone 62. TIME-RUG (タイムRUG, Taimu RUG)
- Bone 63. Moja Likes Cleanliness (モージャは綺麗好き, Mōja wa Kirei Suki)
- Bone 64. Ripped Triangle, Shimada Comes Again (さいては三角、また来てしま田。, Saite wa Sankaku, Mata Kite Shimada)
- Bone 65. Edge Eater (崖っぷちイーター, Gakeppuchi Ītā)
- Bone 66. With Food, the Good and the Bad (飯し良し悪し, Meshi Yoshiashi)

== Reception ==
Dai Dark ranked seventh on Takarajimasha's Kono Manga ga Sugoi! list of best manga of 2021 for male readers. The series was nominated for the 2022 Next Manga Award in the print manga category and placed fourteenth out of 50 nominees.
