= Radiation House =

Japanese manga series

- First tankōbon volume cover

ラジエーションハウス (Rajiēshon Hausu)
- Genre: Medical drama
- Manga
- Written by: Tomohiro Yokomaku
- Illustrated by: Taishi Mori
- Published by: Shueisha
- Magazine: Grand Jump
- Original run: October 21, 2015 – present
- Volumes: 21
- Television drama
- Directed by: Masayuki Suzuki
- Written by: Haruka Ōkita; Yu Murakami; Tatsuya Kanazawa; Tomohiro Yokomaku
- Music by: Takayuki Hattori
- Studio: Fuji TV
- Original network: Fuji TV
- Original run: April 8, 2019 – December 13, 2021
- Episodes: 22
- Live-action film
- Directed by: Masayuki Suzuki
- Written by: Haruka Ōkita
- Music by: Takayuki Hattori
- Released: April 29, 2022
- icon

Radiation House (Japanese: ラジエーションハウス, Hepburn: Rajiēshon Hausu) is a Japanese manga series written by Tomohiro Yokomaku and illustrated by Taishi Mori. It has been serialized in Shueisha's seinen manga magazine Grand Jump since October 2015. A two-season television drama adaptation, consisting of 11 episodes each, was broadcast on Fuji TV from April 2019 to December 2021. A live-action film premiered in April 2022.

== Plot ==
Iori Igarashi is a talented but socially awkward medical radiographer. He is given a chance to work at a hospital run by his childhood friend, An Amakasu. However, An does not seem to remember him, let alone recognize him. Nonetheless, Iori won't allow his personal feelings to get in the way of his work. He will continue to do his job to help his patients and the hospital staff.

== Media ==
=== Manga ===
Written by Tomohiro Yokomaku and illustrated by Taishi Mori, Radiation House started in Shueisha's seinen manga magazine Grand Jump on October 21, 2015. In February 2023, it was announced that the manga would enter on hiatus due to Mori's poor health; it resumed on April 19 of the same year. Shueisha has collected its chapters into individual tankōbon volumes. The first volume was released on June 17, 2016. As of November 18, 2026, 21 volumes have been released.

==== Volumes ====
No.	Release date	ISBN
1	June 17, 2016	978-4-08-890465-8
2	October 19, 2016	978-4-08-890516-7
3	March 17, 2017	978-4-08-890621-8
4	August 18, 2017	978-4-08-890737-6
5	January 19, 2018	978-4-08-890851-9
6	July 19, 2018	978-4-08-891081-9
7	March 19, 2019	978-4-08-891160-1
8	June 19, 2019	978-4-08-891305-6
9	January 17, 2020	978-4-08-891472-5
10	December 18, 2020	978-4-08-891744-3
11	September 17, 2021	978-4-08-892042-9
12	December 17, 2021	978-4-08-892179-2
13	July 19, 2022	978-4-08-892385-7
14	February 17, 2023	978-4-08-892611-7
15	September 19, 2023	978-4-08-892807-4
16	May 17, 2024	978-4-08-893243-9
17	November 19, 2024	978-4-08-893453-2
18	May 19, 2025	978-4-08-893673-4
19	November 19, 2025	978-4-08-893887-5
20	April 17, 2026	978-4-08-894170-7
21	November 18, 2026	978-4-08-894416-6

=== Drama ===
An eleven-episode television drama adaptation was broadcast on Fuji TV from April 8 to June 17, 2019. A second season was broadcast from October 4 to December 13, 2021.

=== Live-action film ===
In December 2021, it was announced that a live-action film adaptation, featuring the same cast from the drama, premiered on April 29, 2022.
