= Pseudo Harem =

Japanese manga series and its adaptation(s)

- Cover of the first tankōbon volume, featuring Rin Nanakura

疑似ハーレム (Giji Hāremu)
- Genre: Romantic comedy
- Manga
- Written by: Yū Saitō
- Published by: Shogakukan
- Imprint: Shōnen Sunday Comics Special
- Magazine: Self-published (June 20, 2018 – March 5, 2021); Monthly Shōnen Sunday (January 12, 2019 – March 12, 2021)
- Original run: June 20, 2018 – March 5, 2021
- Volumes: 6
- Anime television series
- Directed by: Toshihiro Kikuchi
- Produced by: Takanori Matsuoka; Masayuki Yaguchi; Yuuki Konishi; Shinji Oomori; Tatsuya Ono
- Written by: Yūko Kakihara
- Music by: Takeshi Watanabe
- Studio: Nomad
- Licensed by: Crunchyroll; EA/SEA: Medialink
- Original network: Tokyo MX, BS Fuji, AT-X
- Original run: July 5, 2024 – September 20, 2024
- Episodes: 12
- icon

Pseudo Harem, also known as Giji Harem (Japanese: 疑似ハーレム, Hepburn: Giji Hāremu), is a Japanese manga series written and illustrated by Yū Saitō. It was posted as a webcomic on Saitō's Twitter account from June 2018 to March 2021, and was later parallelly serialized in Shogakukan's Monthly Shōnen Sunday from January 2019 to March 2021, with its chapters collected into six tankōbon volumes. An anime television series adaptation produced by Nomad aired from July to September 2024.

== Plot ==
Eiji Kitahama, a second-year high school student, yearns for popularity more than anything. His days are filled with dreams of being surrounded by admiring peers. Rin Nanakura, his junior in the drama club, decides to use her acting skills to help Eiji achieve this goal. With her talent, she crafts a harem of loving girls, each one showering Eiji with affection. But behind these diverse characters is Rin herself, and her feelings for Eiji are genuine, though Eiji remains completely unaware.

As Eiji receives attention from the various "girls", he is enchanted by Rin's performances. Her colorful and dynamic acting brings joy to his life, leaving him wondering if the actress behind these roles will ever find a way into his heart. The line between reality and performance blurs, creating a drama of its own in which Eiji might discover that the most genuine love comes from the one person who had been there all along.

== Characters ==
Eiji Kitahama (北浜 瑛二, Kitahama Eiji)
Voiced by: Nobuhiko Okamoto
Eiji is a member of the Drama Club who is also Rin's senior. His wish is to be popular and have a harem, just like in manga. To fulfill his wish, Rin acts out many archetypes in hopes for her to color his world. He often mistakes Rin's actions of affection as method acting, as he is largely unaware she is in love with him. It is later revealed that he fell in love with Rin at first sight.
Rin Nanakura (七倉 凛, Nanakura Rin)
Voiced by: Saori Hayami
Rin is a member of the Drama Club who is a method actress. She gets into comedic situations with Eiji in which she poses as different archetypes such as "imp-chan", "tsundere-chan" and "cool-chan". She has a huge crush on Eiji, but Eiji himself is often unable to properly decipher her feelings due to her acting skills. At the end of the series, she becomes an actress and she and Eiji marry.
Ayaka Nanakura (七倉 綾香, Nanakura Ayaka)
Voiced by: Mai Narumi
She is the younger sister of Rin. She is an elementary school student.
Motokuni Nakayama (中山 元邦, Nakayama Motokuni)
Voiced by: Junichi Suwabe
Nakayama is a clubmate of Eiji and Rin who is also the member of the Drama Club.
Tsuguto Iwata (岩田 嗣人, Iwata Tsuguto) / Tsu-chan (つーちゃん, Tsū-chan)
Voiced by: Kōji Yusa
Iwata is a member of the Drama Club who works as a scriptwriter. He is also good at telling ghost stories.
Megu (めぐ)
Voiced by: Maria Abo
She is a student at Kouban High and a close friend of Rin.
Kiri Shirasawa (白沢 きり, Shirasawa Kiri)
Voiced by: Minako Sato
She is a first-year student who is a part of the Drama Club. She admires Rin.

== Media ==
=== Manga ===
Written and illustrated by Yū Saitō, Pseudo Harem was first posted as a webcomic on Saitō's Twitter account from June 20, 2018, to March 5, 2021. The manga was subsequently serialized in parallel in Shogakukan's Monthly Shōnen Sunday from January 12, 2019, to March 12, 2021, collecting its chapters into six tankōbon volumes, released from March 12, 2019, to April 12, 2021.

==== Volumes ====
No.	Japanese release date	Japanese ISBN
1	March 12, 2019	978-4-09-129095-3
2	August 8, 2019	978-4-09-129365-7
3	January 10, 2020	978-4-09-129580-4
4	June 12, 2020	978-4-09-850140-3
5	November 12, 2020	978-4-09-850325-4
6	April 12, 2021	978-4-09-850468-8

=== Anime ===
An anime television series adaptation was announced on April 10, 2023. It is produced by Nomad and directed by Toshihiro Kikuchi, with Yūko Kakihara handling series scripts, Yoshihisa Sato designing the characters, and Takeshi Watanabe composing the music, with Pony Canyon credited for music production. The series aired from July 5 to September 20, 2024, on Tokyo MX and other networks. (Note: Tokyo MX listed the series premiere on July 4, 2024, at 24:30, which is effectively July 5 at 12:30 a.m. JST.) The opening theme song is "Blouse" (ブラウス) performed by Gohobi, while the ending theme song is "Ad-lib" (アドリブ) performed by Saori Hayami as her character Rin Nanakura. Crunchyroll streamed the series. Medialink licensed the series in East (Note: Excluding Mainland China, North and South Korea, and Japan.) and Southeast Asia for streaming on Ani-One Asia's YouTube channel.

==== Episodes ====
No.	Title	Directed by	Storyboarded by	Original release date
1	"The Beginning of a Story?"; Transliteration: "Monogatari no Hajimari?" (Japanese: 物語の始まり？)	Toshihiro Kikuchi	Toshihiro Kikuchi	July 5, 2024
2	"Confession?"; Transliteration: "Kokuhaku?" (Japanese: 告白？)	Yūichi Satō	Toshihiro Kikuchi	July 12, 2024
3	"Lesson in Love?"; Transliteration: "Ren'ai Shinan?" (Japanese: 恋愛指南？)	Ryō Ōkubo	Hideaki Uehara	July 19, 2024
4	"Wow?" (Note: Stylized in all caps)	Ikuhiro Matsui	Hiroyuki Yamada	July 26, 2024
5	"Summer Vacation"; Transliteration: "Natsu Yasumi" (Japanese: 夏休み)	Yudai Hanaoka	Hideki Tonokatsu	August 2, 2024
6	"First Date?"; Transliteration: "Hatsu Dēto?" (Japanese: 初デート？)	Nao Miyoshi	Yuta Suzuki	August 9, 2024
7	"Graduation"; Transliteration: "Sotsugyō" (Japanese: 卒業)	Takanori Yano	Toshihiro Kikuchi	August 16, 2024
8	"Adults"; Transliteration: "Otona" (Japanese: 大人)	Takashi Ando	Hiroaki Shimura	August 23, 2024
9	"A Person To Love"; Transliteration: "Sukina Hito" (Japanese: 好きな人)	Yusuke Nakagama	Daisuke Kurose	August 30, 2024
10	"Birthday"; Transliteration: "Bāsudei" (Japanese: バースデイ)	Yūichi Satō	Yūichi Satō	September 6, 2024
11	"Love Triangle?"; Transliteration: "San-kaku Kankei?" (Japanese: 三角関係？)	Higashio Yamauchi	Masami Watanabe	September 13, 2024
12	"The Beginning of a Story"; Transliteration: "Monogatari no Hajimari" (Japanese: 物語の始まり)	Toshihiro Kikuchi	Toshihiro Kikuchi	September 20, 2024

== Reception ==
In 2019, the series was nominated for the fifth Next Manga Awards in the print category and was ranked seventh out of 50 nominees.
