= Koroshiya S no Yuragi =

Japanese manga series

- First tankōbon volume cover

殺し屋Sのゆらぎ
- Genre: Romantic comedy
- Manga
- Written by: Erika Funamoto
- Published by: Shogakukan
- Imprint: Shōnen Sunday Comics Special
- Magazine: Monthly Shōnen Sunday
- Original run: December 12, 2018 – March 12, 2021
- Volumes: 4
- icon

Koroshiya S no Yuragi (殺し屋Sのゆらぎ; "Fluctuations of the Hitman S") is a Japanese manga series written and illustrated by Erika Funamoto. It was serialized in Shogakukan's shōnen manga magazine Monthly Shōnen Sunday from December 2018 to March 2021, with its chapters collected in four tankōbon volumes.

== Publication ==
Written and illustrated by Erika Funamoto, Koroshiya S no Yuragi was serialized in Shogakukan's shōnen manga magazine Monthly Shōnen Sunday from December 12, 2018, to March 12, 2021. Shogakukan collected its chapter in four tankōbon volumes, released from June 12, 2019, to May 12, 2021.

=== Volumes ===
No.	Japanese release date	Japanese ISBN
1	June 12, 2019	978-4-09-129277-3
2	February 12, 2020	978-4-09-129716-7
3	November 12, 2020	978-4-09-850322-3
4	May 12, 2021	978-4-09-850565-4

== Reception ==
The manga was nominated for the 2020 Next Manga Award in the print category.
