= Tetsugaku Letra =

Japanese manga series

- First tankōbon volume cover

鉄楽レトラ (Tetsugaku Retora)
- Genre: Slice of life
- Manga
- Written by: Mizu Sahara
- Published by: Shogakukan
- Magazine: Monthly Shōnen Sunday
- Original run: April 12, 2011 – December 12, 2014
- Volumes: 6
- icon

Tetsugaku Letra (Japanese: 鉄楽レトラ, Hepburn: Tetsugaku Retora) is a Japanese manga series written and illustrated by Mizu Sahara. It was serialized in Shogakukan's shōnen manga magazine Monthly Shōnen Sunday from April 2011 to December 2014, with its chapters collected in six tankōbon volumes.

== Publication ==
Written and illustrated by Mizu Sahara, Tetsugaku Letra was serialized in Shogakukan's shōnen manga magazine Monthly Shōnen Sunday from April 12, 2011, to December 12, 2014. Shogakukan collected its chapters in six tankōbon volumes, released from October 12, 2011, to February 12, 2015.

=== Volumes ===
No.	Japanese release date	Japanese ISBN
1	October 12, 2011	978-4-09-123445-2
2	April 12, 2012	978-4-09-123616-6
3	November 12, 2012	978-4-09-124077-4
4	July 12, 2013	978-4-09-124340-9
5	May 12, 2014	978-4-09-124740-7
6	February 12, 2015	978-4-09-125754-3
