= Les Misérables (manga) =

Japanese manga series

- First tankōbon volume cover
- Genre: Historical
- Created by: Victor Hugo
- Manga
- Illustrated by: Takahiro Arai
- Published by: Shogakukan
- English publisher: NA: Seven Seas Entertainment
- Imprint: Shōnen Sunday Comics Special
- Magazine: Monthly Shōnen Sunday
- Original run: September 12, 2013 – May 12, 2016
- Volumes: 8
- icon

Les Misérables (stylized as LES MISERABLES) is a Japanese manga series by Takahiro Arai, based on Victor Hugo's 1862 novel of the same name. It was serialized in Shogakukan's shōnen manga magazine Monthly Shōnen Sunday from September 2013 to May 2016, with its chapters collected in eight tankōbon volumes.

== Publication ==
Based on Victor Hugo's novel of the same name, Takahiro Arai's Les Misérables manga adaptation was serialized in Shogakukan's shōnen manga magazine Monthly Shōnen Sunday from September 12, 2013, to May 12, 2016. Shogakukan collected its chapters in eight tankōbon volumes, released from December 12, 2013, to July 12, 2016.

In February 2022, Seven Seas Entertainment announced that they licensed the series for English release in North America. They released a four-volume omnibus edition from December 13, 2022, to December 5, 2023.

=== Volumes ===
No.	Original release date	Original ISBN	English release date	English ISBN
1	December 12, 2013	978-4-09-124536-6	December 13, 2022	978-1-63858-995-2
2	April 11, 2014	978-4-09-124687-5	December 13, 2022	978-1-63858-995-2
3	August 12, 2014	978-4-09-125200-5	March 28, 2023	978-1-63858-996-9
4	January 9, 2015	978-4-09-125518-1	March 28, 2023	978-1-63858-996-9
5	May 12, 2015	978-4-09-126110-6	July 25, 2023	978-1-68579-603-7
6	October 9, 2015	978-4-09-126338-4	July 25, 2023	978-1-68579-603-7
7	March 11, 2016	978-4-09-127040-5	December 5, 2023	978-1-68579-945-8
8	July 12, 2016	978-4-09-127350-5	December 5, 2023	978-1-68579-945-8

== See also ==
- Adaptations of Les Misérables
- Case Closed: Zero's Tea Time, another manga series by the same illustrator
