= 365 Days to the Wedding =

Japanese manga series and its adaptations

- First tankōbon volume cover

結婚するって、本当ですか (Kekkon Surutte, Hontō desu ka?)
- Genre: Comedy-drama; Romantic comedy; Slice of life
- Manga
- Written by: Tamiki Wakaki
- Published by: Shogakukan
- English publisher: NA: Seven Seas Entertainment
- Magazine: Weekly Big Comic Spirits
- Original run: March 16, 2020 – June 12, 2023
- Volumes: 11
- Television drama

Map for the Wedding
- Directed by: Ryō Miyawaki; Hitomi Kitagawa
- Written by: Keiko Kaname; Akahiko Takaishi
- Music by: Ryo Yoshimata
- Licensed by: Amazon Prime Video
- Original run: October 7, 2022
- Episodes: 10
- Anime television series
- Directed by: Hiroshi Ikehata
- Written by: Kazuho Hyodo
- Music by: Shun Narita; Yūsuke Seo
- Studio: Ashi Productions
- Licensed by: Crunchyroll (streaming); SEA: Plus Media Networks Asia
- Original network: Tokyo MX, BS11
- English network: SEA: Aniplus Asia
- Original run: October 3, 2024 – December 19, 2024
- Episodes: 12
- icon

365 Days to the Wedding (Japanese: 結婚するって、本当ですか, Hepburn: Kekkon Surutte, Hontō desu ka?; lit. 'Are You Really Getting Married?') is a Japanese manga series written and illustrated by Tamiki Wakaki. It was serialized in Shogakukan's seinen manga magazine Weekly Big Comic Spirits from March 2020 to June 2023, with its chapters collected in eleven tankōbon volumes.

A ten-episode drama adaptation, released in English under the title Map for the Wedding, premiered on Amazon Prime Video in October 2022. An anime television series adaptation produced by Ashi Productions aired from October to December 2024.

== Plot ==
Takuya Ohara and Rika Honjoji work at the same travel agency. The company announced that they were opening a new branch in Irkutsk, Siberia (Anchorage, Alaska in the live-action and anime adaptations), and unmarried employees will be recruited to work there. Fearing they both were going to be chosen, they decided to fake their relationship until someone was chosen.

== Characters ==
Takuya Ohara (大原 拓也, Ōhara Takuya)
Voiced by: Kentarō Kumagai
Rika Honjoji (本城寺 莉香, Honjōji Rika)
Voiced by: Saori Hayami
Asako Kurokawa (黒川 麻子, Kurokawa Asako)
Voiced by: Ami Koshimizu
Hiromi Gonda (権田 広見, Gonda Hiromi)
Voiced by: Fukushi Ochiai
Natsumi Komiya (小宮 夏海, Komiya Natsumi)
Voiced by: Kana Asumi
Keisuke Itsuki (伊槻 佳祐, Itsuki Keisuke)
Voiced by: Haruki Ishiya
Susumu Shinshi (進士 奨, Shinshi Susumu)
Voiced by: Kentaro Tone
Jouji-san (ジョージさん)
Voiced by: Jouji Nakata
Claudia (クラウディア, Kuraudia)
Voiced by: Nao Tōyama
Nao Umiyama (海山 ナオ, Umiyama Nao)
Voiced by: Fairouz Ai
Kōichi Ōhara (大原 耕一, Ōhara Kōichi)
Voiced by: Tesshō Genda

== Media ==
=== Manga ===
Written and illustrated by Tamiki Wakaki, 365 Days to the Wedding was serialized in Shogakukan's seinen manga magazine Weekly Big Comic Spirits from March 16, 2020, to June 12, 2023. Shogakukan collected its chapters in eleven tankōbon volumes, released from August 7, 2020, to July 12, 2023.

On February 8, 2023, Seven Seas Entertainment announced that it had licensed the manga. The eleven volumes were released from November 14, 2023, to April 14, 2026.

==== Volumes ====
No.	Original release date	Original ISBN	English release date	English ISBN
1	August 7, 2020	978-4-09-860648-1	November 14, 2023	979-8-88843-263-1
1. "Are You Really Getting Married?"; 2. "Do You Really Need to Announce It?"; 3. "Do You Really Need to Celebrate It?"; 4. "Does There Really Need to Be a Backstory?"; 5. "Do You Really Need to Propose?"; 6. "Do You Really Need an Engagement Ring?"; 7. "What Does Marriage Really Mean? (Part 1)"; 8. "What Does Marriage Really Mean? (Part 2)"
2	November 12, 2020	978-4-09-860759-4	February 13, 2024	979-8-88843-332-4
9. "Can You Introduce Yourself Properly? (Part 1)"; 10. "Can You Introduce Yourself Properly? (Part 2)"; 11. "Can You Introduce Yourself Properly? (Part 3)"; 12. "Can You Share Your Crisis? (Part 1)"; 13. "Can You Share Your Crisis? (Part 2)"; 14. "Can You Share Your Crisis? (Part 3)"; 15. "Can You Share Your Crisis? (Part 4)"; 16. "Can You Share Your Life? (Part 1)"; 17. "Can You Share Your Life? (Part 2)"; 18. "Can You Share Your Life? (Part 3)"
3	March 12, 2021	978-4-09-860880-5	May 7, 2024	979-8-88843-577-9
19. "Can You Share Your Life? (Part 4)"; 20. "Can You Share Your Life? (Part 5)"; 21. "Can You Share Your Life? (Part 6)"; 22. "Can You Share Your Life? (Part 7)"; 23. "Are You Happy Together? (Part 1)"; 24. "Are You Happy Together? (Part 2)"; 25. "Are You Happy Together? (Part 3)"; 26. "Are You Happy Together? (Part 4)"; 27. "Are You Happy Together? (Part 5)"; 28. "Are You Happy Together? (Part 6)"; 29. "Are You Happy Together? (Part 7)"
4	July 12, 2021	978-4-09-861072-3	August 20, 2024	979-8-88843-578-6
30. "Is This Really a Confession of Love? (Part 1)"; 31. "Is This Really a Confession of Love? (Part 2)"; 32. "Is This Really a Confession of Love? (Part 3)"; 33. "Is This Really a Confession of Love? (Part 4)"; 34. "Can You Handle a Date? (Part 1)"; 35. "Can You Handle a Date? (Part 2)"; 36. "Can You Handle a Date? (Part 3)"; 37. "Can You Handle a Date? (Part 4)"; 38. "Can You Handle a Date? (Part 5)"; 39. "Can You Handle a Date? (Part 6)"
5	November 12, 2021	978-4-09-861180-5	November 12, 2024	979-8-88843-579-3
40. "Are We Really Going to Live Together? (Part 1)"; 41. "Are We Really Going to Live Together? (Part 2)"; 42. "Are We Really Going to Live Together? (Part 3)"; 43. "Are We Really Going to Live Together? (Part 4)"; 44. "Are We Really Going to Live Together? (Part 5)"; 45. "Are We Really Going to Live Together? (Part 6)"; 46. "Are You Fine with This Being the End? (Part 1)"; 47. "Are You Fine with This Being the End? (Part 2)"; 48. "Are You Fine with This Being the End? (Part 3)"; 49. "Are You Fine with This Being the End? (Part 4)"; 50. "Are You Fine with This Being the End? (Part 5)"
6	March 11, 2022	978-4-09-861258-1	January 7, 2025	979-8-89160-172-7
51. "What Does a Marriage Need? (Part 1)"; 52. "What Does a Marriage Need? (Part 2)"; 53. "What Does a Marriage Need? (Part 3)"; 54. "What Does a Marriage Need? (Part 4)"; 55. "Are You Bored Because Life Isn't Working Out? (Part 1)"; 56. "Are You Bored Because Life Isn't Working Out? (Part 2)"; 57. "Are You Bored Because Life Isn't Working Out? (Part 3)"; 58. "Are You Bored Because Life Isn't Working Out? (Part 4)"; 59. "Are You Bored Because Life Isn't Working Out? (Part 5)"; 60. "Are You Bored Because Life Isn't Working Out? (Part 6)"
7	July 12, 2022	978-4-09-861328-1	April 15, 2025	979-8-88843-496-3
61. "Are You Bored Because Life Isn't Working Out? (Part 7)"; 62. "Are You Bored Because Life Isn't Working Out? (Part 8)"; 63. "We're All Girls Here, So Can We Be Honest? (Part 1)"; 64. "We're All Girls Here, So Can We Be Honest? (Part 2)"; 65. "We're All Girls Here, So Can We Be Honest? (Part 3)"; 66. "What Is It Like to Become Family? (Part 1)"; 67. "What Is It Like to Become Family? (Part 2)"; 68. "What Is It Like to Become Family? (Part 3)"; 69. "What Is It Like to Become Family? (Part 4)"; 70. "What Is It Like to Become Family? (Part 5)"
8	October 12, 2022	978-4-09-861427-1	July 1, 2025	979-8-89373-002-9
71. "What Is It Like to Become Family? (Part 6)"; 72. "If We're Getting Married, What Do We Do About Our Parents? (Part 1)"; 73. "If We're Getting Married, What Do We Do About Our Parents? (Part 2)"; 74. "If We're Getting Married, What Do We Do About Our Parents? (Part 3)"; 75. "If We're Getting Married, What Do We Do About Our Parents? (Part 4)"; 76. "If We're Getting Married, What Do We Do About Our Parents? (Part 5)"; 77. "If We're Getting Married, What Do We Do About Our Parents? (Part 6)"; 78. "If We're Getting Married, What Do We Do About Our Parents? (Part 7)"; 79. "If We're Getting Married, What Do We Do About Our Parents? (Part 8)"; 80. "Too Many Decisions to Make? (Part 1)"
9	January 12, 2023	978-4-09-861567-4	October 7, 2025	979-8-89373-344-0
81. "Too Many Decisions to Make? (Part 2)"; 82. "Too Many Decisions to Make? (Part 3)"; 83. "Too Many Decisions to Make? (Part 4)"; 84. "Too Many Decisions to Make? (Part 5)"; 85. "Too Many Decisions to Make? (Part 6)"; 86. "Too Many Decisions to Make? (Part 7)"; 87. "Too Many Decisions to Make? (Part 8)"; 88. "Too Many Decisions to Make? (Part 9)"; 89. "What Even Is Marriage? (Part 1)"; 90. "What Even Is Marriage? (Part 2)"
10	April 12, 2023	978-4-09-861687-9	January 6, 2026	979-8-89373-591-8
91. "What Even Is Marriage? (Part 3)"; 92. "What Even Is Marriage? (Part 4)"; 93. "What Even Is Marriage? (Part 5)"; 94. "What Even Is Marriage? (Part 6)"; 95. "What Even Is Marriage? (Part 7)"; 96. "What Do Family Memories Taste Like?"; 97. "Can You Talk to Your Mother? (Part 1)"; 98. "Can You Talk to Your Mother? (Part 2); 99. "Can You Talk to Your Mother? (Part 3)"; 100. "Can You Talk to Your Mother? (Part 4)"
11	July 12, 2023	978-4-09-861737-1	April 14, 2026	979-8-89373-592-5
101. "Can You Talk to Your Mother? (Part 5)"; 102. "Can You Talk to Your Mother? (Part 6); 103. "Can You See the Ocean Yet? (Part 1)"; 104. "Can You See the Ocean Yet? (Part 2)"; 105. "Can You See the Ocean Yet? (Part 3)"; 106. "Finally, Can You Enjoy Marriage? (Part 1)"; 107. "Finally, Can You Enjoy Marriage? (Part 2)"; 108. "Finally, Can You Enjoy Marriage? (Part 3)"; 109. "Where Will Your Marriage Take You? (Part 1)"; 110. "Where Will Your Marriage Take You? (Part 2)"

=== Drama ===
In July 2022, it was announced that the manga would receive a drama adaptation. The drama stars Wakana Aoi and Kanta Sato as the two lead characters, and was directed by Ryō Miyawaki and Hitomi Kitagawa, with scripts by Keiko Kaname and Akahiko Takaishi and music composed by Ryo Yoshimata. The ten-episode series premiered on October 7, 2022, on Amazon Prime Video in Japan and select territories, and released in English under the title Map for the Wedding. Aimer performed the theme song "Ivy Ivy Ivy".

=== Anime ===
In April 2023, it was announced that the manga would receive an anime adaptation, which was later revealed to be a television series produced by Ashi Productions and directed by Hiroshi Ikehata, with scripts written by Kazuho Hyodo, characters designed by Shuji Maruyama, and music composed by Shun Narita and Yūsuke Seo. The series aired from October 3 to December 19, 2024, on Tokyo MX and BS11. The opening theme song is "Kirakira" (キラキラ; lit. 'Sparkling'), performed by HoneyWorks featuring HaKoniwalily, while the ending theme song is "Tsumari wa" (つまりは; lit. 'In Short'), performed by Gohobi.

Crunchyroll streamed the series. Plus Media Networks Asia licensed the series in Southeast Asia for simulcasting on Aniplus Asia.

==== Episodes ====
No.	Title	Directed by (Note: Production staff information is taken from the ending credits of each episode.)	Written by	Storyboarded by	Original release date
1	"Why Don't We Get Married?"; Transliteration: "Watashi to, Kekkon Shimasen ka?" (Japanese: 私と、結婚しませんか?)	Tomio Yamauchi	Kazuho Hyodo	Hiroshi Ikehata	October 3, 2024
Ohara is a social introvert at the JTC travel agency who struggles with talking to people, so he is often yelled at by his manager, Kurokawa, and is frequently terrified by his co-worker Honjoji glaring at him. In reality, Honjoji is also an introvert with little interest in others. JTC's head office requires someone, preferably unmarried, to transfer to Alaska in 365 days. Ohara and Honjoji both fear they will be chosen. Ohara admits to Honjoji that he plans to quit his job to avoid the transfer, but Honjoji impulsively asks him to fake a relationship with her until someone else gets transferred. He eventually agrees, and Honjoji convinces Kurokawa they are engaged but want it kept secret for personal reasons. Instead, Kurokawa throws them a party with their co-workers. Facing questions about their relationship, Honjoji distracts everyone by singing karaoke. Honjoji begins inventing the story of their fake first date but would like him to think of the words he used for his fake proposal. Ohara is flustered as she has already bought wedding rings. He suddenly thinks of the perfect words but cannot bring himself to say them out loud. Honjoji is happy to wait until he is ready.
2	"What Does It Mean to Get Married?"; Transliteration: "Kekkon Surutte, Nan desu ka?" (Japanese: 結婚するって、なんですか?)	Chen Xiaoshen	Ken'ichi Yamashita	Mitsuko Ōya	October 10, 2024
Ohara receives an anonymous call from someone who knows their engagement is fake. Their co-worker Gonda asks to visit Ohara's home, so Honjoji brings some of her things over to make it appear she spends time there. Gonda admits he needs help to ask their co-worker Komiya on a date. After he leaves, Honjoji admits she is confused why their co-workers seem obsessed with their relationship. Ohara suspects they view marriage as happiness, like when he spends time with his cat Kama, or when Honjoji indulges her hobby of studying maps. Suddenly flustered around each other, they try to remember that their relationship is fake. Two weeks later, Ohara's father, Koichi, visits JTC, worried by a rumour that Ohara got engaged. Honjoji panics and lies, claiming to know nothing. However, she quickly feels guilty and takes Koichi to a coffee shop to wait for Ohara. Koichi turns out to have very traditional beliefs about marriage. As his eldest son, Ohara must have a traditional wedding, a highly complex public ceremony which includes their whole village of over 200 people, otherwise their family will suffer dishonour. Honjoji feels ill at the idea of such a public ordeal. Ohara rushes to the coffee shop.
3	"Can We Share Our Predicaments?"; Transliteration: "Pinchi o, Wakachi Aemasu ka?" (Japanese: ピンチを、分かち合えますか?)	Akira Mano	Yutaka Satō	Hiroshi Ikehata	October 17, 2024
Koichi admits he was joking and Aso village weddings are now much smaller events. Koichi recalls hearing about the wedding from the JTC branch near Aso. Ohara promises to visit Aso at the weekend. Ohara is asked to accompany Princess Claudia of Liechtbourg as she visits Tokyo. Kurokawa warns him Claudia is married but promiscuous. Honjoji is unsure how to react. Realising Claudia dislikes tourist attractions, Ohara takes her to a cat shrine, a shopping arcade, and even a school rooftop. Honjoji struggles with jealousy, despite her and Ohara not being lovers. Ohara is glad the visit was successful, until Claudia asks to visit his home. Honjoji convinces herself to visit Ohara's home, using the excuse of dropping off a gift, but rushes inside when she realizes Claudia is present. At first, she is upset, until it turns out that Claudia invited Honjoji to meet her too, but Honjoji never saw the messages. Claudia reveals she is considering divorcing her husband to live with her girlfriend Marie and settling down to a happy, normal marriage. After Claudia leaves, Honjoji gives Ohara his gift, a frog-shaped stone, since Koichi told her Ohara loved frogs as a child. She then flees, embarrassed, but Ohara finds her cute.
4	"Can We Share Our Lives?"; Transliteration: "Jinsei o, Wakachi Aemasu ka?" (Japanese: 人生を、分かち合えますか?)	Yū Yabuuchi	Ken'ichi Yamashita	Masayoshi Nishida	October 24, 2024
Gonda asks Ohara about Aso, causing a misunderstanding among their coworkers that Honjoji is meeting his parents. Ohara explains he is going alone, but Honjoji receives an anonymous call reminding her they are being watched and that it would be better if Honjoji went on the trip. Knowing she will probably have to apologise to Ohara's parents, Honjoji makes sure to dress well. Honjoji tells Ohara about her family; her father was absent, and her mother travelled for work, so Honjoji would study maps to find all the places her mother was working. As soon as they get off the plane, they encounter Ohara's grandmother (Koichi's mother), and Honjoji ends up blurting out the truth, that she and Ohara are not engaged. Seeming to ignore this, Grandma takes them to the family fruit shop where Honjoji helps harvest melons. Grandma tells Honjoji she is confident they will end up marrying, knowing Ohara, she is certain he has feelings for Honjoji, so his being brave enough to visit could only mean he is planning to announce their engagement; he just has not realised it himself yet. Honjoji is so shocked she passes out from heat stroke. Ohara carries her inside, where Koichi suddenly arrives.
5	"How About We Travel Together?"; Transliteration: "Issho ni Tabi o, Shimasen ka?" (Japanese: 一緒に旅を、しませんか?)	Fumio Maezono	Kazuho Hyо̄dо̄	Fumikazu Satо̄	October 31, 2024
Ohara admits they are not getting married. Koichi is furious as they could have told him in the coffee shop. The doctor diagnoses exhaustion and insists she rest. Ohara admits the truth to his two older sisters and his mother. Honjoji awakens and feels guilty that he had to apologise alone. Despite the late hour, Honjoji asks to go for a walk. Talking, Honjoji starts to wonder if marriage is just two people who get along. Ohara almost admits something to her, but is distracted by all the frogs. Curious about what Ohara almost admitted, Honjoji does not get any sleep. The next morning, Honjoji finds herself fantasising about Ohara's messy hair but quickly stops. As the flight home is not for hours, they visit Aso's volcano museum where Honjoji becomes unusually enthusiastic. A school trip causes a commotion, but Ohara proves adept at dealing with children, and together they give an impromptu geography lesson. On the drive back, Honjoji fantasises about his hair again. Ohara encounters Nao Miyama, a childhood friend. Nao teases him by ruffling his hair, causing Honjoji to feel foolish for allowing herself to fantasise. Nao reveals she works as a glassmaker and will be visiting Tokyo for work experience, leaving Ohara and Honjoji speechless from shock.
6	"Are Two People Happy Together?"; Transliteration: "Futari de Iru tte, Shiawase desu ka?" (Japanese: 二人でいるって、幸せですか?)	Akira Mano, Ryota Komatsu	Yukata Satо̄	Mitsuko О̄ya	November 7, 2024
Honjoji decides to resist feeling anything for Ohara. Their co-worker Shinshi brags about his great marriage. The next day, JTC is thrown into chaos when Shinshi misses work, leaving a lot of customers inconvenienced. Shinshi's young son Hideo visits, revealing that Shinshi's wife had asked for a divorce. The usually quiet co-worker George, sends Ohara with Hideo to look for Shinshi. Ohara realises that with his limited understanding of marriage, he cannot even begin to understand divorce, or help Hideo. Eventually, all of JTC find Shinshi drunk, but he runs away. Honjoji ends up looking after Hideo and is reminded of her parents arguing. George captures Shinshi, who returns to normal after seeing Hideo cry. Despite feeling terrible, Shinshi is forced to return home to talk with his wife. JTC announces its yearly Inter-branch Display Contest. Kurokawa decides their display will focus on the ocean, but everyone is still depressed after the Shinshi incident. George points out that just because Shinshi was happy does not mean his wife was, and soon everyone has differing opinions about marriage. This only makes Ohara more confused, especially as he and Honjoji are still not speaking. Honjoji is startled when Nao appears from nowhere, desperately asking for her help.
7	"Can I Come Over to Your Place?"; Transliteration: "Heya ni Itte mo, Ii desu ka?" (Japanese: 部屋に行っても、いいですか?)	Hideki Hiroshima	Ken'ichi Yamashita	Hiroaki Shimura	November 14, 2024
Nao cannot find her new apartment, which turns out to be in the building next door to Honjoji's. Nao invites herself to Honjoji's apartment for drinks. As Honjoji nervously starts to become drunk, she reveals that Ohara is bad at communicating, and she cannot tell if he likes her or not. Also drunk, Nao calls Ohara and demands that he visit Honjoji's apartment. Nao then passes out. Ohara arrives, and Honjoji is still drunk enough that she demands to know what he almost said in Aso. Ohara claims he was going to say he enjoyed their walk, which leaves Honjoji disappointed. As they are talking again, Ohara admits the world is so confusing that he often cannot find the right words. Honjoji admits she has experienced many disappointments, so it became easier to switch off her feelings, and yet with Ohara, she is so confused all the time that she cannot turn them off. Ohara abruptly asks her to be his real girlfriend. Internally, they both panic and spend over 10 minutes staring at each other with no idea what to say next. Ohara eventually leaves from sheer embarrassment, taking the unconscious Nao with him. Honjoji passes out from the alcohol and stress.
8	"Are Declarations of Love Genuine?"; Transliteration: "Ai no Kokuhaku-tte, Hontō desu ka?" (Japanese: 愛の告白って、ほんとうですか?)	Masahiko Watanabe	Yukata Satо̄	Masayoshi Nishita	November 21, 2024
Ohara plans to spend his day off depressed at home, but Gonda visits to tell him about a new dating app. Ohara is shocked to learn that most modern marriages started via dating apps. Gonda met a woman named Kaori on the app who is a fan of a idol group Gonda likes. Ohara finds the whole idea depressing. Amazingly, Kaori and Gonda hit it off and spent all day together. Three days later, Gonda tells Ohara he wants to marry Kaori. Ohara is curious why Gonda wants to marry. Gonda admits he craves a stable family life to make up for his bad childhood. Ohara urges him to go for it if it makes him happy. Gonda asks Kaori to be his girlfriend to marry. Kaori reveals she is a single mother with a baby boy, so he needs to be certain he wants to marry her. After several days, Gonda arranges to meet Kaori again, but she sends her friend Ichika with the message that he not need to worry about her and she enjoyed meeting him. Gonda admits to Ohara he is not ready to marry, since the moment he was faced with responsibility, he could not handle it and hurt Kaori. Seeing Gonda cry makes Ohara think about his feelings for Honjoji.
9	"Rika-san, How Are You?"; Transliteration: "Rika-san, Ogenkidesuka?" (Japanese: 莉香さん、お元気ですか?)	Jun Takada & Keisuke Nishijima	Kazuho Hyodo	Jun Takada	November 28, 2024
Nao finally catches up to Honjoji to apologise and offers her a free glass-making class. With nothing else to do except worry about Ohara Honjoji accepts and meets Nao's mentor, Hoshi. Glass making turns out to be physically taxing, yet Honjoji feels more clear-headed. She realises that turning off her emotions has stopped her from being able to make decisions. Honjoji receives a surprise message from her mother, Ritsu, who is visiting Tokyo and wishes to see her. Ritsu, an interior designer with a good-natured but overbearing personality, talks so much that Honjoji can barely respond. Honjoji realises she will probably never be as decisive as Ritsu about anything. Ritsu abruptly asks about marriage and warns Honjoji that choosing the right man is vital. Honjoji misses several calls from Ohara, convincing him she is avoiding him. Ritsu eventually leaves but calls an unknown person to ask them about the rumour that Honjoji is getting married. Honjoji feels guilty when she sees Ohara's missed calls and convinces herself that Ohara cannot possibly have feelings for her but has just been confused by their fake relationship. Becoming angry at him and herself, she marches over to his apartment to reject him, only when he opens the door, she instead asks him on a date.
10	"Are You Okay with Dating?"; Transliteration: "Dēto suru tte, Daijōbu desu ka?" (Japanese: デートするって、大丈夫ですか?)	Dīroku	Kenichi Yamashita	Masayoshi Nishida	December 5, 2024
Ohara follows Honjoji's instructions and meets her in Hamura city where she reveals she will be touring Tamagawa Aqueduct, but he is free to go home if he finds it boring. Honjoji plans to be her normal self all day without considering his feelings, hoping that once Ohara sees the real her, he will change his mind. Ohara is fascinated by Honjoji's passion for geography and especially her smile. Honjoji mistakenly believes Ohara is bored and continues ignoring him, yet Ohara claims to be enjoying himself. Shocked her plan backfired, Honjoji decides to end it here and will accept the transfer to Alaska and never see him again. Shocked by her own words, she cries as she realises she wants to stay with him. Ohara decides to stop being afraid, grabs her hand, and they kiss. After getting over the shock, Honjoji decides she needs to think about everything they have been through, leaving Ohara alone and bewildered. Honjoji makes it home before completely losing her mind; embarrassed, panicking, nervous, happy, and flustered. Kurokawa receives a phone call about Honjoji and Ohara. At work, they are nervous as they keep thinking about the kiss. Kurokawa invites them both to discuss something very important.
11	"Are You Serious About Living Under the Same Roof?"; Transliteration: "Hitotsu Yane no Kudatte, Maji desu ka?" (Japanese: 一つ屋根の下って、本気(マジ)ですか?)	Akira Mano	Yutaka Satо̄	Mitsuko О̄ya	December 12, 2024
Kurokawa asks them to create an online blog about their careers and home life, designed to show potential recruits that JTC supports family values. They have no idea what to do since they do not have a home life, but refusing might draw attention from the anonymous phone caller. Honjoji decides they should do the blog, meaning she has to move into Ohara's apartment. To prevent misunderstandings and situations, she creates strict rules, even setting up a tent as her private space. Honjoji also faces Kama, Ohara's territorial pet cat, whose reaction to her presence is uncertain at best. Honjoji discovers Ohara is an excellent cook, since he collects exotic spices from different countries whenever he goes on vacation. They next struggle with using the bathroom, so they compromise by visiting a public bathhouse. Bedtime arrives with both of them worrying that something might happen. Honjoji retreats to her tent, and they end up texting each other. Honjoji struggles with the heat inside the insulated tent. Both consider asking the other if they can join them, but cannot muster the courage. Honjoji eventually escapes from her tent to cool down. Ohara wonders if things would be less difficult if they actually got married.
12	"Are You Really Getting Married?"; Transliteration: "Kekkon Suru tte, Hontō desu ka?" (Japanese: 結婚するって、本当ですか?)	Fumio Maezuno; Masato Uchibori	Kazuho Hyodo	Hiroshi Ikehata	December 19, 2024
Kurokawa takes the blog to her boss Mamaru as proof that Honjoji and Ohara are engaged. Mamaru decides that Gonda will transfer to Alaska. Ohara is filled with guilt and ends up admitting everything to Kurokawa. Kurokawa reveals Honjoji did the same thing, but tells them not to worry as she has already volunteered to go to Alaska, viewing it as an adventure for her and her husband. They end their fake engagement, and Honjoji moves out of Ohara's apartment, but cries as she leaves. Ohara realizes he is letting fear control him, rushes after her to ask her to marry him for real. Following his example, Honjoji agrees, and they both confess they love each other. They admit the truth to their co-workers, but reveal that this time their engagement is genuine. The anonymous caller congratulates Ohara on getting married for real. Unable to believe their good fortune, Ohara and Honjoji act like love-struck teenagers. Ritsu is revealed to have been in contact with Komiya, while their co-worker Keisuke is hinted to be the anonymous caller. Ohara's family is thrilled at the news, as are Nao, Claudia, and her girlfriend Marie. Ohara and Honjoji continue working at JTC together, only now they share a kiss every morning.
