= Asagiro: Asagi Ōkami =

Japanese manga series

- First tankōbon volume cover

アサギロ～浅葱狼～
- Genre: Epic; Historical
- Manga
- Written by: Minoru Hiramatsu
- Published by: Shogakukan
- Imprint: Monthly Shōnen Sunday Comics
- Magazine: Monthly Shōnen Sunday
- Original run: May 12, 2009 – present
- Volumes: 34

Asagiro: Asagi Ōkami (Japanese: アサギロ～浅葱狼～) is a Japanese manga series written and illustrated by Minoru Hiramatsu. It has been serialized in Shogakukan's shōnen manga magazine Monthly Shōnen Sunday since May 2009, with its chapters collected in 34 tankōbon volumes as of November 2026.

== Publication ==
Written and illustrated by Minoru Hiramatsu, Asagiro: Asagi Ōkami started in Shogakukan's shōnen manga magazine Monthly Shōnen Sunday on May 12, 2009. (Note: It started in the magazine's first issue (June issue) of 2009 (cover date June 12), which was released on May 12.) Shogakukan has collected its chapters into individual tankōbon volumes. The first volume was released on December 12, 2009. As of November 12, 2026, 34 volumes have been released.

The series has also been serialized on Shogakukan's online platform Sunday Webry since July 1, 2017.

=== Volumes ===
No.	Release date	ISBN
1	December 12, 2009	978-4-09-122106-3
2	July 12, 2010	978-4-09-122387-6
3	February 10, 2011	978-4-09-122738-6
4	August 12, 2011	978-4-09-123129-1
5	February 10, 2012	978-4-09-123479-7
6	August 10, 2012	978-4-09-123757-6
7	February 12, 2013	978-4-09-124119-1
8	August 12, 2013	978-4-09-124396-6
9	February 12, 2014	978-4-09-124590-8
10	August 12, 2014	978-4-09-125190-9
11	February 12, 2015	978-4-09-125739-0
12	August 12, 2015	978-4-09-126256-1
13	February 12, 2016	978-4-09-127019-1
14	August 12, 2016	978-4-09-127368-0
15	February 10, 2017	978-4-09-127540-0
16	September 12, 2017	978-4-09-127739-8
17	February 9, 2018	978-4-09-128153-1
18	August 9, 2018	978-4-09-128477-8
19	March 12, 2019	978-4-09-129083-0
20	September 12, 2019	978-4-09-129408-1
21	April 10, 2020	978-4-09-850085-7
22	November 12, 2020	978-4-09-850320-9
23	May 12, 2021	978-4-09-850563-0
24	November 12, 2021	978-4-09-850797-9
25	May 12, 2022	978-4-09-851120-4
26	November 10, 2022	978-4-09-851373-4
27	May 12, 2023	978-4-09-852050-3
28	November 10, 2023	978-4-09-853026-7
29	May 10, 2024	978-4-09-853314-5
30	November 12, 2024	978-4-09-853691-7
31	May 12, 2025	978-4-09-854095-2
32	November 12, 2025	978-4-09-854336-6
33	May 12, 2026	978-4-09-854593-3
34	November 12, 2026	978-4-09-855003-6

== See also ==
- Shinsengumi
