= Welcome to the El-Palacio =

Japanese manga series

- First tankōbon volume cover, featuring Ouka Shumisen

ここが噂のエル・パラシオ (Koko ga Uwasa no Eru-Parashio)
- Genre: Harem; Romantic comedy
- Manga
- Written by: Takao Aoyagi
- Published by: Shogakukan
- Magazine: Monthly Shōnen Sunday
- Original run: May 12, 2009 – August 12, 2013
- Volumes: 7
- Television drama
- Music by: LiLi
- Studio: TV Tokyo; The Works
- Original network: TXN (TV Tokyo)
- Original run: October 8, 2011 – December 24, 2011
- icon

Welcome to the El-Palacio (Japanese: ここが噂のエル・パラシオ, Hepburn: Koko ga Uwasa no Eru Parashio; lit. 'This Is the Famous El Palacio') is a Japanese manga series written and illustrated by Takao Aoyagi. It was serialized in Shogakukan's Monthly Shōnen Sunday from May 2009 to August 2013, with its chapters collected in seven tankōbon volumes. A 12-episode Japanese television drama adaptation was broadcast on TV Tokyo from October to December 2011.

== Plot ==
A young man awakens in El-Palacio, a struggling all-female professional wrestling group, with no memory of his past. He discovers Ouka Shumisen, one of the wrestlers, rescued him from a near-fatal accident—though the ordeal left him with amnesia. Ōoka dubs him "Tadasuke Ōoka" after the samurai magistrate and assigns him as El-Palacio's live-in referee and handyman while he searches for his identity.

== Characters ==
Tadasuke Ōoka (大岡 忠輔, Ōoka Tadasuke)
Portrayed by: Kouhei Takeda
Afflicted by amnesia, he recalls nothing of his past and resides at El-Palacio, working as a cleaner, launderer, and match referee. Ouka names him after a famed samurai known for fairness and integrity. Despite his dependable and kind demeanor, he frequently struggles with Ouka's eccentric behavior and initially lacks familiarity with professional wrestling customs. Nevertheless, he embraces his role earnestly, upholding impartiality even when pressured—such as during the match between Ouka and Azumi, where his own fate hangs in the balance. When urged to manipulate the outcome, he refuses and officiates honestly. Later, he glimpses a fragmented memory of being rescued from bullies by a young girl, heavily suggested to be Ouka.
Ouka Shumisen (須弥仙 桜花, Shumisen Ouka)
Portrayed by: Eriko Sato
Ouka leads El-Palacio as its bold, outspoken figurehead. Unapologetically brash and headstrong, she disregards others' opinions, a trait that carries into her wrestling style—earning her an unwanted heel reputation. Though abrasive, she genuinely cares for El-Palacio's members, preferring tough-love guidance over hand-holding. As one of the group's original members alongside Mariko, she strives to revive its former glory, often resorting to reckless methods to draw attention. Initially treating Tadasuke as little more than a pet, she gradually respects him as he proves himself a principled referee, eventually developing romantic feelings. While Tadasuke's fragmented memories suggest a childhood connection between them, Ouka never confirms it.
Bunny Kisaragi (バニー・キサラギ, Kisaragi Bani)
Portrayed by: Rina Takeda
Bunny is El-Palacio's masked high-flyer, playing a heroic face beloved by children. She claims carrots give her strength, prompting fans to gift them to her. A talented seamstress but poor cook, she hides her past as Sae Kisaragi (如月 冴江), a former karate dojo heir saved by Ouka after a suicide attempt. She never removes her mask except before Ouka and Tadasuke, who saw her by accident. Bonding with Tadasuke over their reinvented lives, she wonders if he would accept his past self should his memories return.
Mariko Tanahashi (棚橋 万里子, Tanahashi Marika)
Portrayed by: Rina Sawayama
Mariko serves as El-Palacio's nurturing caretaker, known for her kindness and culinary skills. However, she transforms into the ruthless gunslinger "Mary the Kid" (マリー・ザ・キッド) in the ring, adopting a cold cowgirl persona. While the group treats her dual identities as separate, Tadasuke struggles with fans who fear Mariko due to her heel character. Sensitive about being the oldest at 25, she occasionally slips into her aggressive ring persona when teased about her age. Observant and perceptive, she alone notices both Ouka and Hina's romantic interest in Tadasuke.
Itsuka Makihara (牧原 いつか, Makihara Itsuka)
Portrayed by: Yuzuki Aikawa
One of the younger members of El-Palacio, Itsuka is a high school student who has a very casual personality. She usually skips school, feeling it is a waste of time and believing that her classmates do not understand or respect pro wrestling. She is also the biggest eater among the wrestlers at El-Palacio. Her in-ring persona is based on Sun Wukong from the classic novel Journey to the West.
Hina Asano (浅野, Makihara Itsuka)
Portrayed by: Shizuka Nakamura
Hina, El-Palacio's 14-year-old wrestler, is gentle yet insecure—the group's youngest and most timid member. She harbors quiet feelings for Tadasuke, treating him with noticeable kindness that makes her affection obvious to others. Her innocent charm and moe appeal earn her a devoted male fanbase, many resentful of Tadasuke's proximity to her.
Azumi
Portrayed by: Io Shirai
Azumi reigns as HEAt's top champion, having abandoned El-Palacio during its decline for greater fame. She returns to claim Ouka's Violet Belt, but when met with indifference, raises the stakes by challenging for "ownership" of Tadasuke as well. Despite her ruthless ambition, she retains some loyalty—sending a HEAt rookie to train at El-Palacio to hone her skills.
Death Carpenter (デス・カーペンター, Desu Kāpentā)
HEAt's top-ranked heel, she rivals Ouka in the national rankings. Portraying a brutal carpenter in the ring, she wields tools like hammers and barbed wire as weapons. Tadasuke discovers her true identity as Yuki Shirato (白戸雪)—a regular carpenter by day, completely separate from her vicious wrestling persona.

== Media ==
=== Manga ===
Written and illustrated by Takao Aoyagi, Welcome to the El-Palacio was serialized in Shogakukan's Monthly Shōnen Sunday from May 12, 2009, to August 12, 2013. Shogakukan collected its chapters in seven tankōbon volumes, released from January 12, 2010, to October 11, 2013.

==== Volumes ====
No.	Japanese release date	Japanese ISBN
1	January 12, 2010	978-4-09-122090-5
2	August 12, 2010	978-4-09-122546-7
3	May 12, 2011	978-4-09-122834-5
4	October 12, 2011	978-4-09-123287-8
5	June 12, 2012	978-4-09-123614-2
6	March 12, 2013	978-4-09-124121-4
7	October 11, 2013	978-4-09-124437-6

=== Drama ===
A 12-episode television drama adaptation was broadcast on TV Tokyo from October 8 to December 24, 2011. (Note: TV Tokyo listed the series air dates on Friday at 24:12, which is effectively Saturday at 0:12 JST.) The theme song for the series is "Ready Go", performed by 4Minute.

== See also ==
- Dai-13 Hokenshitsu, another manga series by the same author
