= Dai-13 Hokenshitsu =

Japanese manga series

- First tankōbon volume cover

第13保健室
- Genre: Comedy
- Manga
- Written by: Takao Aoyagi
- Published by: Shogakukan
- Magazine: Monthly Shōnen Sunday
- Original run: May 12, 2014 – September 12, 2016
- Volumes: 4

Dai-13 Hokenshitsu (第13保健室; "The 13th School Infirmary") is a Japanese manga series written and illustrated by Takao Aoyagi. It was serialized in Shogakukan's shōnen manga magazine Monthly Shōnen Sunday from May 2014 to September 2016.

== Publication ==
Written and illustrated by Takao Aoyagi, Dai-13 Hokenshitsu was serialized in Shogakukan's shōnen manga magazine Monthly Shōnen Sunday from May 12, 2014, to September 12, 2016. Shogakukan collected its chapters in four tankōbon volumes, released from November 12, 2014, to October 12, 2016.

=== Volumes ===
No.	Japanese release date	Japanese ISBN
1	November 12, 2014	978-4-09-125524-2
2	June 12, 2015	978-4-09-126155-7
3	March 11, 2016	978-4-09-127048-1
4	October 12, 2016	978-4-09-127445-8

== See also ==
- Welcome to the El-Palacio, another manga series by the same author
