= Hitori Bocchi no Chikyū Shinryaku =

Japanese manga series

- First tankōbon volume cover

ひとりぼっちの地球侵略
- Genre: Action, science fiction
- Manga
- Written by: Maiko Ogawa
- Published by: Shogakukan
- Magazine: Monthly Shōnen Sunday
- Original run: March 12, 2012 – September 12, 2018
- Volumes: 15
- icon

Hitori Bocchi no Chikyū Shinryaku (ひとりぼっちの地球侵略) is a Japanese manga series written and illustrated by Maiko Ogawa. It was serialized in Shogakukan's shōnen manga magazine Monthly Shōnen Sunday from March 2012 to September 2018, with its chapters collected in fifteen tankōbon volumes.

== Plot ==
Misaki Hirose enrolls at Seisho Prefectural High School. On the morning of the entrance ceremony, a masked girl suddenly appears and chases him, saying that she will "take his life". The girl is Nozomi Otori, a second-year student at the same school. She tells Misaki that ten years ago, a fleet of spaceships attacked the town and that she gave him her heart when he suffered a fatal heart injury. She invites him to join her in her plan to invade Earth, but he does not believe her and refuses. He goes home. That night, Misaki's grandfather is attacked by aliens. To protect his family, Misaki agrees to help Nozomi invade Earth.

== Publication ==
Written and illustrated by Maiko Ogawa, Hitori Bocchi no Chikyū Shinryaku was serialized in Shogakukan's shōnen manga magazine Monthly Shōnen Sunday from March 12, 2012, to September 12, 2018. Shogakukan collected its chapters in fifteen tankōbon volumes, released from July 12, 2012, to November 12, 2018.

=== Volumes ===
No.	Japanese release date	Japanese ISBN
1	July 12, 2012	978-4-09-123754-5
2	December 12, 2012	978-4-09-123878-8
3	May 10, 2013	978-4-09-124271-6
4	October 11, 2013	978-4-09-124419-2
5	March 12, 2014	978-4-09-124588-5
6	August 12, 2014	978-4-09-125198-5
7	January 9, 2015	978-4-09-125519-8
8	June 12, 2015	978-4-09-126150-2
9	December 11, 2015	978-4-09-126598-2
10	June 10, 2016	978-4-09-127240-9
11	December 12, 2016	978-4-09-127469-4
12	May 12, 2017	978-4-09-127621-6
13	October 12, 2017	978-4-09-127736-7
14	April 12, 2018	978-4-09-128261-3
15	November 12, 2018	978-4-09-128695-6
