= Case Closed: Zero's Tea Time =

Japanese manga series

- First tankōbon volume cover, featuring Rei Furuya

名探偵コナン ゼロの日常(ティータイム) (Meitantei Conan Zero no Tī Taimu)
- Created by: Gosho Aoyama
- Manga
- Written by: Takahiro Arai
- Published by: Shogakukan
- English publisher: SG: Shogakukan Asia
- Imprint: Shōnen Sunday Comics Special
- Magazine: Weekly Shōnen Sunday
- Original run: May 9, 2018 – May 25, 2022
- Volumes: 6
- Anime television series
- Directed by: Tomochi Kosaka
- Produced by: Shuho Kondo; Emi Sato; Hiroya Nakata; Kiyoaki Terashima
- Written by: Yoshiko Nakamura
- Music by: Tomisiro
- Studio: TMS Entertainment
- Licensed by: Netflix (streaming rights)
- Original network: Tokyo MX, ytv, BS Nippon
- Original run: April 5, 2022 – May 10, 2022
- Episodes: 6
- icon

Case Closed: Zero's Tea Time, also known as Detective Conan: Zero's Tea Time (Japanese: 名探偵コナン ゼロの日常(ティータイム), Hepburn: Meitantei Konan Zero No Tī Taimu), is a Japanese manga series written and illustrated by Takahiro Arai. It is a spin-off of the Case Closed manga by Gosho Aoyama, with Aoyama supervising the project, and is centered on the character Toru Amuro. It was serialized in Shogakukan's Weekly Shōnen Sunday from May 2018 to May 2022. A six-episode anime television series adaptation produced by TMS Entertainment was broadcast from April to May 2022.

Arai launched another spin-off in Weekly Shōnen Sunday, titled Detective Conan: Police Academy Arc – Wild Police Story, which ran from October 2019 to November 2020.

== Characters ==
Rei Furuya (降谷 零, Furuya Rei)
Voiced by: Tōru Furuya (Japanese); Kyle McCarley (English)
He has three faces: he protects Japan as Rei Furuya of the Public Security Police, serves as an apprentice detective under Kogoro Mori as "Toru Amuro", and also infiltrates a black-ops organization under the code name "Bourbon".
Azusa Enomoto (榎本 梓, Enomoto Azusa)
Voiced by: Mikiko Enomoto (Japanese); Janice Kawaye (English)
Works at the Poirot coffee shop, located downstairs from the Mori Detective Agency.
Midori Kuriyama (栗山 緑, Kuriyama Midori)
Voiced by: Asako Dodo (Japanese); Julie Ann Taylor (English)
A secretary supporting Eri Kisaki, who runs the Kisaki Law Office.
Yuya Kazami (風見 裕也, Kazami Yuya)
Voiced by: Nobuo Tobita (Japanese); Ray Chase (English)
A public security police officer in the Public Safety Department of the Tokyo Metropolitan Police Department. He works hard to assist Amuro as his right-hand man.
Haro (ハロ)
Voiced by: Megumi Han
A stray dog that suddenly appeared in front of the mortuary.

== Media ==
=== Manga ===
Written and illustrated by Takahiro Arai, with supervision by Gosho Aoyama, the manga was serialized in Shogakukan's Weekly Shōnen Sunday from May 9, 2018, to May 25, 2022, with its conclusion announced as the end of its first part. The series was only published when Aoyama's main series, Case Closed, was on hiatus. Shogakukan collected its chapters in six tankōbon volumes, released from August 8, 2018, to June 17, 2022.

Shogakukan Asia licensed the manga for English language release in Southeast Asia in January 2019.

Arai published another spin-off, titled Detective Conan: Police Academy Arc – Wild Police Story, which ran in Weekly Shōnen Sunday from October 2, 2019, to November 18, 2020.

==== Volumes ====
No.	Release date	ISBN
1	August 8, 2018	978-4-09-128536-2
2	October 8, 2018	978-4-09-128638-3
3	April 10, 2019	978-4-09-128884-4
4	November 18, 2019	978-4-09-129497-5
5	October 18, 2021	978-4-09-850803-7
6	June 17, 2022	978-4-09-851175-4

=== Anime ===
On October 4, 2021, it was announced that the manga would receive an anime adaptation. In November 2021, at Netflix's "Festival Japan" virtual event, it was revealed that they would stream the series. It is produced by TMS Entertainment and directed by Tomochi Kosaka, with scripts written by Yoshiko Nakamura, character designs handled by Kyōko Yoshimi, and music composed by Tomisiro. The series was broadcast for six episodes on Tokyo MX, ytv, and BS Nippon from April 5 to May 10, 2022. The opening theme is "Shooting Star" by Rakura, while the ending theme is "Find the truth" by Rainy. The series premiered on Netflix outside of Japan on July 29, 2022.

==== Episodes ====
No.	Title	Directed by (Note: Information is taken from the ending credits of each episode.)	Written by	Storyboarded by	Original release date	English release date
1	"Time. 1"	Tomochi Kosaka	Yoshiko Nakamura	Tomochi Kosaka	April 5, 2022	July 29, 2022
2	"Time. 2"	Tomochi Kosaka	Yoshiko Nakamura	Jirō Kanai, Iwao Teraoka	April 12, 2022	July 29, 2022
3	"Time. 3"	Yasuhito Takahashi	Yoshiko Nakamura	Iwao Teraoka	April 19, 2022	July 29, 2022
4	"Time. 4"	Yasuhito Takahashi	Yoshiko Nakamura	Iwao Teraoka	April 26, 2022	July 29, 2022
5	"Time. 5"	Minoru Tozawa	Yoshiko Nakamura	Yasuyuki Honda	May 3, 2022	July 29, 2022
6	"Time. 6"	Hitomi Ezoe	Yoshiko Nakamura	Jiro Kanai	May 10, 2022	July 29, 2022

== Reception ==
Detective Conan: Zero's Tea Time ranked sixth on the "Nationwide Bookstore Employees' Recommended Comics of 2018" ranking by the Honya Club website. The series ranked seventh on AnimeJapan's "Most Wanted Anime Adaptation" poll in 2019.

== See also ==
- Les Misérables, another manga series by Takahiro Arai
