= Q and A (manga) =

Japanese manga series

- Volume 1 of Q and A with Atsushi (left) and Yuho (right)

QあんどA (Kyū ando Ē)
- Genre: Romantic comedy
- Manga
- Written by: Mitsuru Adachi
- Published by: Shogakukan
- Magazine: Monthly Shōnen Sunday
- Original run: May 12, 2009 – April 12, 2012
- Volumes: 6
- icon

Q and A (Japanese: QあんどA, Hepburn: Kyū ando Ē) is a Japanese manga series written and illustrated by Mitsuru Adachi. It was serialized in Shogakukan's Monthly Shōnen Sunday from May 2009 to March 2012. It was one of the first manga to be launched in Gessan. The "Q" in the title is for the nickname "Q-chan" for character Hisashi, and the "A" for Atsushi.

== Plot ==
Atsushi Ando and his family moved away from his hometown after the death of his older brother, Hitsushi, nicknamed Q-chan, but they eventually return after six years. When returning home from his first day out after moving in, Atsushi sees his brother is still around in the form of a ghost, waiting for the family to come back all these years. In a feverish haze, he is convinced he is just seeing things, but the next morning realizes that his brother's ghost is still present. Not only that, but the only one who can see Hitsushi's ghost is Atsushi.

== Characters ==
Atsushi Ando
15-years-old and a first year in high school. Atsushi lived in the shadow of his brother, always being compared to him and being given high expectations. He accidentally joins the track and field team when Q-chan submits his application for him against his will.
Hisashi Ando (Q-chan)
Currently deceased, but living on in spirit as a ghost that only his younger brother Atsushi can see (although now Hisashi is younger than Atsushi currently is). He dies six years before the series begins and was age 11 at the time of his death. He was very popular in school and was known for being very fast and setting school records. As a ghost, he frequently flips girls skirts and engages in overall perverted acts. The nickname Q-chan (Kyu-chan) comes from another way of reading "Hisashi."
Yuho Maezawa
Yuho was in the same class as Atsushi in first grade, but does not recognize him when he returns. Her family owns a pharmacy.
Riki Jinno
He formerly bullied Atsushi as a child and continues to appear to be a bully in general. It appears that he had a crush on Yuho in junior high school and sent her love letters. He is the captain of the high school's track team, although he has not participated in practice and bullied the other team members into making him captain.
Kyoko Kurosumi
A quiet girl in Atsushi's class who seems dark and mysterious and can apparently see ghosts and the like.
Kosei Maezawa
Yuho's older brother who is a manga artist. He is a freeloader and often breaks the fourth wall.

== Publication ==
Written and illustrated by Mitsuru Adachi, Q and A started in the debut issue of Shogakukan's shōnen manga magazine Monthly Shōnen Sunday on May 12, 2009. The series finished on March 12, 2012. (Note: Anime News Network incorrectly stated that the series would end with the May 2012 issue. However, it actually ended with the April issue, which was released in March.) Its chapters were collected in six tankōbon volumes, released from November 12, 2009, to May 11, 2012. Shogakukan republished the series in three wideban volumes, released from June 10 to August 12, 2016. Shogakukan republished the series again in three bunkoban volumes, released from July 12 to September 13, 2019.

=== Volumes ===
No.	Japanese release date	Japanese ISBN
1	November 12, 2009	978-4-09-122098-1
2	May 12, 2010	978-4-09-122239-8
3	October 12, 2010	978-4-09-122579-5
4	April 12, 2011	978-4-09-122829-1
5	November 11, 2011	978-4-09-123288-5
6	May 11, 2012	978-4-09-123607-4

== Reception ==
The second volume peaked at #3 on the Japanese Manga Rankings. The fifth volume peaked at #28 and the sixth and final volume peaked at #19 and sold an estimated 58,938 copies in total.
