= Gohobi =

Japanese band

Gohobi ゴホウビ
- Origin: Hiroshima Prefecture, Japan
- Genres: Rock, pop, anison
- Years active: 2018–present
- Labels: Gohobi Records; Pony Canyon
- Members: Cody (vocals, guitar); Susie (vocals, keyboard); 405 (bass); Muncha (drums, chorus)
- Website: gohobi.site

Gohobi (ゴホウビ, Gohoubi) is a Japanese band signed to Pony Canyon. It was formed in 2018 by Kazuma Kodama, formerly of the band Goodbye Holiday, and singer Yurika Sugie. They released their music independently under their own label Gohobi Records, before making their major debut in 2023 under Pony Canyon. Their music has been used in television commercials and radio programs, as well as anime television series such as Pseudo Harem and 365 Days to the Wedding.

== History ==
Gohobi was formed in November 2018 by vocalists Kazuma Kodama, also known as Cody, and Yurika Sugie, also known as Susie. Kodama was previously part of the band Goodbye Holiday, which disbanded earlier that year, while Sugie was active as a solo singer. They were later joined by Shingo Nishizuka, also known as 405, and Megumi Kodaki, also known as Muncha, two other musicians whom Kodama had worked with. Nishizuka was Sugie's college classmate, while Kodaki was one of her support members during her solo career. At the time, Nishizuka and Kodaki were reluctant to join another band as they had recently left their own bands, but were encouraged to work with Sugie. The band's initial concept was to be a band whose listeners could feel like they were at home, while they also described themselves as being a "five-man band with a tofu mentality".

The band was initially active as an independent artist, releasing tracks under their own record label Gohobi Records. They would release five songs over the next three months, as well as the mini-album We are Gohobi. One of their songs was used in a commercial promoting the 4th anniversary of Abema's Pigg Party social game. A planned solo concert at the Shibuya.WWW venue in 2020 was postponed and later canceled, replaced with a free online concert. The band also hosted the Monday show of the program Tokyo Niigata Music Convoy on the Niigata-based radio station Niigata Kenmin FM Broadcast until the station's closure at the end of June 2020. Founding member Akira Ōmori, who was also Kodama's bandmate in Goodbye Holiday, left the group that same year.

During a concert at Shibuya.WWW in 2022, the band announced that it would make its major debut under Pony Canyon in 2023. Their major debut release was the digital single "Suki na Fuku" (好きな服) which was released on January 18, 2023. In 2024, their song "Blouse" (ブラウス) was used as the opening theme to the anime television series Pseudo Harem. Later that year, their song "Tsumari wa" (つまりは) was used as the ending theme to the anime television series 365 Days to the Wedding.

== Members ==
=== Current members ===
- Kazuma Kodama (児玉 一真, Kodama Kazuma) (Cody) – vocals, guitar
- Yurika Sugie (杉恵 ゆりか, Sugie Yurika) (Susie) – vocals, keyboard
- Shingo Nishizuka (西塚 真吾, Nishizuka Shingo) (405) – bass
- Megumi Kodaki (小瀧 恵, Kodaki Megumi) (Muncha) – drums, chorus

=== Former members ===
- Akira Ōmori (大森 皓, Ōmori Akira) (Morishi) – guitar
