= Rainy (singer) =

Japanese pop singer

- Also known as: Ruca
- Born: Ruca Sharon Pike; June 28, 2008 (age 18); Fukuoka, Japan
- Genres: J-pop
- Years active: 2018–present
- Label: B Zone (2022–present)
- Website: rainy.bzone.co.jp

YouTube information
- Channel: Rainy
- Years active: 2022–present
- Subscribers: 18.5 thousand
- Views: 8.69 million
- Last updated: August 5, 2026

Ruca Sharon Pike (パイク琉華シャロン, Paiku Ruka Sharon; born June 28, 2008), known professionally as Rainy (stylized as Rainy。), is a Japanese-Australian former model and singer-songwriter who debuted on 5 May 2022 and is currently signed under the B-Zone label, a subsidiary of B Zone. She is half Australian and half Japanese.

== Career ==
Between 2018 and 2021, under the stage name Ruca (Lucia), she was an image model and child singer in the second generation of the Studio fluke model agency's group Team KSC. In 2019, Rainy won the Grand Prix at "Kyushu Teen's Audition 2019" held by the Being Group. In 2020, she made an appearance on the music television program Ongaku Champ 2020 Haru Special broadcast on TV Asahi, performing Chris Hearts's I love you.

Between January and March 2022, Rainy uploaded English cover songs on her YouTube channel. During the recording sessions, her face had not yet been revealed and was shown in silhouette. On 4 May, she made her major debut with the debut single "Find the Truth" as an artist of B Zone Group and its eponymous recording label. The song served as an ending theme to the anime television series Case Closed: Zero's Tea Time.

In 2023, her third digital single Kizunaen was used as a theme song to the console game Fire Emblem Engage. On her 15th birthday on 28 June, she released her first full-length album Rainy Universe. In August, she released her first physical single ...and Rescue me, which served as an ending theme to the television series Case Closed. The song debuted at number 36 on the Weekly Charts and charted for 5 weeks.

== Discography ==
As of the 2023, she has released 5 digital singles, 1 physical single and one original album.

=== Singles ===
Title	Album details	Peak chart positions
Title	Album details	JPN Oricon
...and Rescue me	Released: 23 August 2023; Label: B Zone; Formats: CD, digital download, streaming	36

=== Collaboration singles ===
Title	Album details	Peak chart positions
Title	Album details	JPN Oricon
Find the Truth/Shooting Star	Released: 13 April 2022; Label: B Zone; Formats: CD, digital download, streaming	16

=== Digital singles ===
Year	Single	Reference
2022	"Find the Truth"	
2022	"All or Nothing"	
2023	"Kizunaen" (絆炎)	
2023	"Teenager"	
2023	"Rainbow Christmas"	
2024	"Shine"	
2024	"Gemini"	
2024	"Find the truth -English ver.-"	
2024	"All or Nothing -English ver.-"	
2024	"Riff/Rain"	
2024	"Fight Song"	
2025	"But No Love" (But ノーラヴ)	

=== Albums ===
Title	Album details	Peak chart positions
Title	Album details	JPN Oricon
Rainy Universe	Released: 28 June 2023; Label: B Zone; Formats: CD, digital download, streaming	-
