= Sumomo Yumeka =

Japanese manga artist

Sumomo Yumeka (夢花 李, Yumeka Sumomo) is a Japanese manga artist, who also writes as Mizu Sahara (佐原 ミズ, Sahara Mizu). She writes in a variety of demographics, publishing yaoi manga as Sumomo Yumeka and seinen manga as Mizu Sahara. She is best known in the west for The Day I Became a Butterfly and Same Cell Organism, both under the Yumeka byline, and the manga adaptation of Voices of a Distant Star under Mizu Sahara. Her series My Girl was adapted as a live-action television series which began broadcasting in October 2009.

== Works ==
=== As Sumomo Yumeka ===
- Kokoro Kikai
- Soshite Hibi Koishiteku
- Soshite Koi ga Hajimaru by Kei Tsukimura (illustrator only)
- Natsukashi Machi no Rozione
- Dousabou Seibutsu (published in English by Digital Manga Publishing as Same Cell Organism)
- Chou ni Naru Hi (published in English by Digital Manga Publishing as The Day I Became a Butterfly)
- Tengusin (published in English by Aurora Publishing as Tengu-Jin)
- Nemunoki no Geshukusou
- Kon no Ki Konoha
- Kimi wa Boku no Taiyou
- Hate ni Aru Kimi
- Kaze Shinshutsu Shita
- The Snake and the Boy (Mitoshōnen)
- Boku wa Sakana

=== As Mizu Sahara ===
- Basu Hashiru (includes a series of shorts under the title Nanairo Sekai)
- My Girl
- Hoshi no Koe (written by Makoto Shinkai, illustrator only, published in English by Tokyopop as Voices of a Distant Star)
- Kumo no Mukou, Yakusoku no Basho (written Makoto Shinkai, illustrator only)
- Watashitachi no Shiawase na Jikan (adaption of novel by Ji-Young Gong)
- Tetsugaku Letra
- Itsuya-san
- Okashiratsuki
