= Taishi Mori =

Japanese manga artist

Taishi Mori モリ タイシ
- Born: April 17, 1976 (age 50) Misono, Mie, Japan
- Area: Manga artist
- Notable works: Kyō no Asuka Show

Taishi Mori (モリ タイシ, Mori Taishi; born April 17, 1976) is a Japanese manga artist.

== Works ==
- Kyō no Asuka Show (2009–2013), adapted into an anime.
- Manekoi (-2013)
- Kuchibiru ni uta o (2013–2014), based on a novel of the same name by Eiichi Nakata. A film adaptation has been released in February 2015.
- Radiation House (2015–present)
- Naa-tan to Goshujin-tama (2015)
- Asoko de Hataraku Musubu-san (2017–2025), story and art.
