= Ryō Wada =

Japanese screenwriter and novelist

Ryō Wada (和田 竜, Wada Ryō; born December, 1969) is a Japanese screenwriter and historical novelist. Two of his novels have been adapted to films, The Floating Castle and Land of Stealth.

== Life ==
He was born in Osaka but raised in Asaminami in Hiroshima. As a child he was an avid reader of SF novels, in particular Nerawareta Gakuen, but in high school he became more interested in films after watching The Terminator. After graduating from Waseda University he worked for three years as an assistant director for a television production company. In 2003 his original screenplay won the "Kido Award" sponsored by the Motion Picture Producers Association of Japan to train and educate new screenwriters. In 2007 he made his debut as a fiction writer by turning his winning script into the historical novel Nobō no Shiro (のぼうの城; "Floating Castle") which sold over two million copies. The novel was adapted into a film in 2012 with Wada writing the script. In 2013 Wada published the two-volume historical novel Murakami Kaizoku no Musume (村上海賊の娘; "The Murakami Pirate’s Daughter"), which garnered both the Booksellers Award and the Yoshikawa Eiji Prize for historical fiction and quickly became a bestseller.

== Works ==
- Nobō no Shiro (のぼうの城; "Floating Castle") - Shogakukan, 2007 - adapted into The Floating Castle (2012)
- Shinobi no Kuni (忍びの国; "Land of Stealth") - Shinchosha, 2008 - adapted into Mumon: The Land of Stealth (2017)
- Kotarō No Hidariude (小太郎の左腕; "Kotarō's Left Hand") - Shogakukan, 2009
- Murakami Kaizoku no Musume (村上海賊の娘; "The Murakami Pirate’s Daughter") - Shinchosha, 2013

=== Manga ===
- Shinobi no Kuni illustrated by Mutsumi Banno - serialized in Monthly Shōnen Sunday (2009 - 2010, 4 Volumes)
- Shinobi no Kuni Anthology (2017, 1 Volume)
- Murakami Kaizoku no Musume illustrated by Shirō Yoshida - serialized in Big Comic Spirits (2015 - , 8 Volumes)
