= Mane Mane Nichi Nichi =

Japanese manga series

- Mane Mane Nichi Nichi: Baseball Manager Everyday
- First tankōbon volume cover, featuring (from left to right) Yuki Himemiya, Akane Nagisa, and Karina Ichinose

マネマネにちにち (Mane Mane Nichi Nichi)
- Genre: Comedy; Slice of life; Sports
- Manga
- Written by: Sōichirō Yamamoto
- Published by: Shogakukan
- English publisher: NA: Yen Press
- Imprint: Shōnen Sunday Comics Special
- Magazine: Monthly Shōnen Sunday
- Original run: July 12, 2024 – present
- Volumes: 4

Mane Mane Nichi Nichi: Baseball Manager Everyday (マネマネにちにち, Mane Mane Nichi Nichi) is a Japanese manga series written and illustrated by Sōichirō Yamamoto. It began serialization in Shogakukan's shōnen manga magazine Monthly Shōnen Sunday in July 2024, and has been compiled into four tankōbon volumes as of September 2026.

== Plot ==
The series follows three high school students, Akane Nagisa, Karina Ichinose and Yuki Himemiya, who serve as managers of their school's baseball club. Each of them became managers for different reasons, but despite their different backgrounds and interest in baseball, the three become friends.

== Characters ==
Akane Nagisa (渚 茜, Nagisa Akane)
Voiced by: Rie Takahashi (PV)
A high school student and one of the three managers. She decided to become a manager despite knowing nothing about baseball as she wanted to become more popular.
Karina Ichinose (一ノ瀬 かりな, Ichinose Karina)
Voiced by: Kanna Nakamura (PV)
A high school student and a gyaru. In contrast to Nagisa, she is knowledgeable about baseball, much to the others' surprise.
Yuki Himemiya (姫宮 ユキ, Himemiya Yuki)
Voiced by: Yūko Natsuyoshi (PV)
A high school student. She initially became a manager because her boyfriend was a player on the team at the time, although they since broke up. She is currently dating Shimohara, one of the other players.
Taichi Karasuma (烏丸 太一, Karasuma Taichi)
A high school student who is a first-year member of the baseball club. He is a childhood friend of Nagisa who is a huge fan of baseball.
Shibata (柴田)
A high school student who is a first-year member of the baseball club. He seemingly has a crush on Ichinose.
Shimohara (下原)
A high school student who is a first-year member of the baseball club. He is Himemiya's current boyfriend.
Yagami (八神先輩, Yagami-senpai)
A high school student who is a second-year member of the baseball club. He tends to be scary whenever he is angry.
Hayashi (林)
A high school student who is a first-year member of the baseball club. He often witnesses the various things the managers do.
Tanabe (田辺先生, Tanabe-sensei)
The advisor of the baseball club who is not particularly knowledgeable about the sport.

== Publication ==
Written and illustrated by Sōichirō Yamamoto, Mane Mane Nichi Nichi: Baseball Manager Everyday began serialization in Shogakukan's Monthly Shōnen Sunday on July 12, 2024. The first tankōbon volume was released on March 12, 2025. To promote the volume's release, Shogakukan released a promotional video featuring the voice actresses who played the heroines of Yamamoto's previous works. The first volume gained attention online for costing more compared to other series from the same magazine. Four volumes have been released as of September 11, 2026.

During their panel at San Diego Comic-Con 2026, Yen Press announced that they had licensed the series for English publication.

No.	Release date	ISBN
1	March 12, 2025	978-4-09-853899-7
1. Ketsubatto (ケツバット); 2. Ocha (お茶); 3. Riyū Senshuken (理由選手権); 4. Mote (モテ); 5. Barikan (バリカン); 6. Eroihon (エロい本); 7. Suburi (素振り); 8. Ranningu (ランニング); 9. Neko (ネコ); 10. Wasuremono (忘れ物); 11. Konomi (好み); 12. Onigiri (おにぎり); 13. Kabe ni Mimi Ari (壁に耳アリ); 14. Yaruki (やる気); 15. Kintore (筋トレ); 16. Junbi (準備); 17. Renshūshiai (練習試合); 18. Gohōbi (ごほうび); 19. Negai (願い); Bonus: Taiburēku (タイブレーク)
2	September 11, 2025	978-4-09-854256-7
20. Koromogae (衣替え); 21. Esu to Emu (SとM); 22. Saizu (サイズ); 23. Nagisa Burendo (渚ブレンド); 24. Pūru Sōji (プール掃除); 25. Eki (駅); 26. Kansetsu Kisu (間接キス); 27. Aroma (アロマ); 28. Janken (じゃんけん); 29. "DVD"; 30. Sainbōru (サインボール); 31. Dōga (動画); 32. Omamori (お守り); 33. Uso (嘘); 34. Ōkisa (大きさ); 35. Hagemashikata (励まし方); 36. Jishuren (自主練); 37. Sakebeyo (叫べよ); Bonus: Taiburēku (タイブレーク)
3	March 12, 2026	978-4-09-854482-0
38. Erasa (えらさ); 39. Genjitsu Tōhi (現実逃避); 40. Gohōbi (ご褒美); 41. Ka? (蚊?); 42. Jun'i (順位); 43. Kubimoto (首元); 44. Ashimizu (足水); 45. Hayaoki (早起き); 46. Ukkari (うっかり); 47. Shimakuri (しまくり); 48. Raibaru (ライバル); 49. Iikata (言い方); 50. Mizugi Erabi (水着選び); 51. Onee-chan (おねえちゃん); 52. Kaion (快音); 53. Kaisuiyoku (海水浴); 54. Gyakunan (逆ナン); 55. Hatsu Nanpa (初ナンパ); Bonus: Taiburēku (タイブレーク)
4	September 11, 2026	978-4-09-854820-0
56. Tōkōbi (登校日); 57. Tanjōbi (誕生日); 58. Otomarikai (お泊まり会); 59. Kanshōteki? (感傷的?); 60. Hanabi (花火); 61. Shingakki (新学期); 62. Jūnan (柔軟); 63. Okigasa (置き傘); 64. Apiiru (アピール); 65. Akane no Hyōden (茜の票田); 66. Fukushū Yoshū (復習予習); 67. Sensen (宣戦); 68. Toribia (トリビア); 69. Hirugohan (昼ご飯); 70. Junbi no Hi (準備の日); 71. Yoru no Rōka (夜の廊下); 72. Anokoro Towa (あの頃とは); Bonus: Taiburēku (タイブレーク)

== Reception ==
The series was nominated for the 2025 Next Manga Award in the print category, and was ranked nineteenth; it was also nominated for the same award in 2026, and was ranked sixth.
