= Inexpressive Kashiwada and Expressive Oota =

Japanese manga series by Fuyu Azuma

- First tankōbon volume cover, featuring Akito Oota (back), and Hiyori Kashiwada (front)

顔に出ない柏田さんと顔に出る太田君 (Kao ni Denai Kashiwada-san to Kao ni Deru Ōta-kun)
- Genre: Romantic comedy
- Manga
- Written by: Fuyu Azuma
- Published by: Fujimi Shobo
- English publisher: NA: Kadokawa
- Imprint: Dragon Comics Age
- Magazine: Niconico Seiga (Dra Dra Sharp#)
- Original run: June 22, 2018 – June 9, 2023
- Volumes: 10
- Manga

Inexpressive Kashiwada and Expressive Oota+
- Written by: Fuyu Azuma
- Published by: Fujimi Shobo
- Imprint: Dragon Comics Age
- Magazine: Niconico Seiga (Dra Dra Sharp#)
- Original run: October 13, 2023 – present
- Volumes: 3
- Anime television series
- Directed by: Tomohiro Kamitani
- Written by: Michiko Yokote
- Music by: Yukari Hashimoto; Tetsuya Shitara
- Studio: Studio Polon
- Licensed by: Crunchyroll
- Original network: Tokyo MX, Kansai TV, BS11, HTB, AT-X, NCC
- Original run: October 4, 2025 – December 20, 2025
- Episodes: 12
- icon

Inexpressive Kashiwada and Expressive Oota (Japanese: 顔に出ない柏田さんと顔に出る太田君, Hepburn: Kao ni Denai Kashiwada-san to Kao ni Deru Ōta-kun) is a Japanese web manga series written and illustrated by Fuyu Azuma. It was serialized on Niconico Seiga's Dra Dra Sharp# website from June 2018 to June 2023. An anime television series adaptation produced by Studio Polon aired from October to December 2025.

== Plot ==
Ota frequently makes fun of his classmate, Kashiwada, because her expression never changes. However, his prank never succeeds, mainly due to her getting clued in by his own extremely expressive face. Unbeknownst to them, Kashiwada does change expression, but can be hardly noticed, including her crush towards Ota.

== Characters ==
Hiyori Kashiwada (柏田 ひより, Kashiwada Hiyori)
Voiced by: Shiori Mikami (PV), Akane Fujita (anime)
Usually referred to as Kashiwada-san (柏田さん, Kashiwada-san) by others, she is a seemingly inexpressive girl, whom nobody knows what she is thinking. Instead, most of her expressions are conveyed through her twin ponytails. She and Oota were classmates in kindergarten, and she felt sad when he moved away. She had been attached to him since their kindergarten days and was happy to be reunited with him in high school.
Akito Oota (太田 秋人, Ōta Akito)
Voiced by: Daisuke Kishio (PV), Kyōhei Natsume (anime)
Usually referred to as Oota (太田くん, Ōta-kun) by others, he is a mischievous and selfish boy who is very expressive. He is very easy to read. He is concerned with Kashiwada's inexpressive face and has been trying to make her let out expressions, but to no avail.
Tadokoro (田所君, Tadokoro-kun)
Voiced by: Yūya Hirose (anime)
Oota's friend, who, despite being very optimistic and laid back about almost everything, is also a worry-wart. He questions things Oota does to Kashiwada, but does anything Oota commands him to anyway.
Sata (佐田君, Sata-kun)
Voiced by: Sōhei Horikane (anime)
Oota's honourable student friend who has calm demeanor. He loves to observe Oota and Kashiwada's interactions.
Tabuchi (田淵さん, Tabuchi-san)
Voiced by: Yumiri Hanamori (anime)
The class president, who loves Kashiwada. She thinks Oota is bullying Kashiwada, and has been trying to protect her.
Odajima (小田島さん, Odajima-san)
Voiced by: Mayu Mineda (anime)
A high-spirited girl who is able to read Kashiwada's feelings, but also the only one who is oblivious to Kashiwada's feelings towards Oota. She also likes to see Oota's flustered expression, but she also blushes when Oota does things similar to romantic advances towards her. She eventually realizes that she has romantic feelings towards Oota.
Oota's older sister (太田姉, Ōta Ane)
Voiced by: Shiori Mikami (anime)
Oota's older sister who frequently shows grin on her face and loves to teases her younger brother. She also tries to develop relationships between Oota and Kashiwada—messing with them while at it.
Kashiwada's older brother (柏田兄, Kashiwada Ani)
Voiced by: Daisuke Kishio (anime)
Kashiwada's older brother who dotes on her. Like Kashiwada, he shows lack of emotions behind his smiling face.

== Media ==
=== Manga ===
Written and illustrated by Fuyu Azuma, Inexpressive Kashiwada and Expressive Oota started on Niconico Seiga's Dragon Dragon Age on June 22, 2018; the site was renamed Dra Dra Sharp# in December 2018. The series finished on June 9, 2023. Fujimi Shobo collected its chapters in ten tankōbon volumes, released from December 7, 2018, to July 7, 2023. A promotional video animated by Seven Arcs was released on October 3, 2022; Yui Kinoshita directed, supervised, designed the characters, and wrote the storyboard for the PV. Risa Yoshida was an animation director.

In North America, the manga is licensed for digital English release by Kadokawa.

A spin-off manga series also illustrated by Azuma, titled Inexpressive Kashiwada and Expressive Oota+ (顔に出ない柏田さんと顔に出る太田君+, Kao ni Denai Kashiwada-san to Kao ni Deru Ōta-kun+), began serialization on the same website on October 13, 2023. As of December 9, 2025, three volumes has been released.

==== Volumes ====
No.	Release date	ISBN
1	December 7, 2018	978-4-04-072977-0
2	July 9, 2019	978-4-04-073256-5
3	December 9, 2019	978-4-04-073423-1
4	July 9, 2020	978-4-04-073709-6
5	December 9, 2020	978-4-04-073903-8
6	July 9, 2021	978-4-04-074165-9
7	December 9, 2021	978-4-04-074340-0
8	July 8, 2022	978-4-04-074591-6
9	December 9, 2022	978-4-04-074780-4
10	July 7, 2023	978-4-04-075073-6

==== Inexpressive Kashiwada and Expressive Oota+ ====
No.	Release date	ISBN
1	May 9, 2024	978-4-04-075429-1
2	April 9, 2025	978-4-04-075863-3
3	December 9, 2025	978-4-04-076188-6

=== Anime ===
An anime television series adaptation was announced on March 14, 2025. It is produced by Studio Polon and directed by Tomohiro Kamitani, with Michiko Yokote handling series composition, Naoto Nakamura designing the characters and serving as chief animation director, and Yukari Hashimoto and Tetsuya Shitara composing the music. The series aired from October 4 to December 20, 2025, on Tokyo MX and other networks. The opening theme song is "Hyakumensō" (百面相; 'Funny Faces'), performed by Hashimero, while the ending theme song is "Amanojaku Hero" (あまのじゃくヒーロー; 'Contradiction-Filled Hero'), performed by Sangatsu no Phantasia. Crunchyroll is streaming the series.

==== Episodes ====
No.	Title	Directed by (Note: Production staff information is taken from the ending credits of each episode.)	Written by	Storyboarded by	Original release date
1	"Those Who Are Completely Inexpressive and Those Who Are Super Expressive"; Transliteration: "Mattaku Kao ni Denai Hito to Mechakucha Kao ni Deru Hito" (Japanese: まったく顔に出ない人とめちゃくちゃ顔に出る人)	Ken Katō	Michiko Yokote	Tomohiro Kamitani	October 4, 2025
2	"Kashiwada-san and Oota-kun and the Pool"; Transliteration: "Kashiwada-san to Ōta-kun to Pūru" (Japanese: 柏田さんと太田君とプール)	Asahi Kubo	Tōko Machida	Natsumi Yasue	October 11, 2025
3	"Kashiwada-san and Oota-san and the Gym Storage Room"; Transliteration: "Kashiwada-san to Ōta-kun to Taiiku Sōko" (Japanese: 柏田さんと太田君と体育倉庫)	Masayuki Matsumoto	Michiko Yokote	Kōji Yoshikawa & Hikaru Takeuchi	October 18, 2025
4	"Kashiwada-san and Oota-kun and a Date"; Transliteration: "Kashiwada-san to Ōta-kun to Dēto" (Japanese: 柏田さんと太田君とデート)	Masayuki Iimura	Tōko Machida	Katsuyuki Kodera	October 25, 2025
5	"Kashiwada-san and Oota-kun and Winter Vacation"; Transliteration: "Kashiwada-san to Ōta-kun to Fuyuyasumi" (Japanese: 柏田さんと太田君と冬休み)	Shigeki Awai	Michiko Yokote	Katsuyuki Kodera	November 1, 2025
6	"Kashiwada-san and Oota-kun's Memories"; Transliteration: "Kashiwada-san to Ōta-kun to Omoide" (Japanese: 柏田さんと太田君と思い出)	Ken Katō	Tōko Machida	Kōji Yoshikawa & Hikaru Takeuchi	November 8, 2025
7	"Kashiwada-san and Oota-kun and Chocolate"; Transliteration: "Kashiwada-san to Ōta-kun to Chokorēto" (Japanese: 柏田さんと太田君とチョコレート)	Masayuki Matsumoto	Michiko Yokote	Masayuki Matsumoto	November 15, 2025
8	"Kashiwada-san and Oota-kun and Lies"; Transliteration: "Kashiwada-san to Ōta-kun to Uso" (Japanese: 柏田さんと太田君と嘘)	Asahi Kubo	Tōko Machida	Natsumi Yasue	November 22, 2025
9	"Kashiwada-san and Oota-kun and the New School Term"; Transliteration: "Kashiwada-san to Ōta-kun to Shin Gakki" (Japanese: 柏田さんと太田君と新学期)	Masayuki Iimura	Michiko Yokote	Kōji Yoshikawa & Hikaru Takeuchi	November 29, 2025
10	"Kashiwada-san and Oota-kun and Rain"; Transliteration: "Kashiwada-san to Ōta-kun to Ame" (Japanese: 柏田さんと太田君と雨)	Shigeki Awai, Ryūtetsu	Tōko Machida	Hiroyuki Shimazu	December 6, 2025
11	"Kashiwada-san and Oota-kun and Memories"; Transliteration: "Kashiwada-san to Ōta-kun to Umi" (Japanese: 柏田さんと太田君と海)	Ken Katō	Michiko Yokote	Natsumi Yasue	December 13, 2025
12	"Kashiwada-san and Oota-kun and the Summer Festival"; Transliteration: "Kashiwada-san to Ōta-kun to Natsu Matsuri" (Japanese: 柏田さんと太田君と夏祭り)	Masayuki Matsumoto	Michiko Yokote	Masayuki Matsumoto & Tomohiro Kamitani	December 20, 2025
