= Peach Boy Riverside =

Japanese manga series

- Cover of remake manga Peach Boy Riverside volume 1 by Kodansha

ピーチボーイリバーサイド (Pīchi Bōi Ribāsaido)
- Genre: Dark fantasy
- Manga

Web manga
- Written by: Coolkyousinnjya
- Published by: Neetsha
- Magazine: Weekly Young VIP
- Original run: January 2008 – present
- Manga

Remake
- Written by: Coolkyousinnjya
- Illustrated by: Johanne
- Published by: Kodansha
- English publisher: NA: Kodansha USA
- Imprint: Monthly Shōnen Magazine Comics
- Magazine: Shōnen Magazine R (2015–2023); Magazine Pocket; Monthly Magazine Base (2023–2024)
- Original run: August 20, 2015 – July 9, 2024
- Volumes: 16
- Anime television series
- Directed by: Shigeru Ueda
- Written by: Keiichirō Ōchi
- Music by: Takaaki Nakahashi
- Studio: Asahi Production
- Licensed by: Crunchyroll (streaming); SA/SEA: Medialink
- Original network: Tokyo MX, BS NTV, AT-X
- Original run: July 1, 2021 – September 16, 2021
- Episodes: 12
- icon

Peach Boy Riverside (ピーチボーイリバーサイド, Pīchi Bōi Ribāsaido) is a Japanese manga series written and illustrated by Coolkyousinnjya, serialized on Neetsha's webcomic distribution site Weekly Young VIP since January 2008. The remake version written by Coolkyousinnjya and illustrated by Johanne was serialized in Kodansha's shōnen manga magazine Shōnen Magazine R, as well as the website and app Magazine Pocket, from August 2015 to July 2024, and was collected in sixteen tankōbon volumes. The manga is licensed in North America by Kodansha USA. An anime television series adaptation produced by Asahi Production aired from July to September 2021.

== Characters ==
Sally (サリー, Sarī) / Saltherine Aldarake (サルトリーヌ・アルダレイク, Sarutorīnu Arudareiku)
Voiced by: Haruka Shiraishi
Kibitsu Mikoto (キビツ ミコト)
Voiced by: Nao Tōyama
Frau (フラウ, Furau)
Voiced by: M.A.O
Hawthorn Grattor (ホーソン・グラトール, Hōson Guratōru)
Voiced by: Toshiki Masuda
Carrot (キャロット, Kyarotto) / Meki (眼鬼)
Voiced by: Megumi Toda
Dog (犬, Inu)
Voiced by: Jiro Saito
Winnie Emex (ウィニー・エメクス, Winī Emekusu)
Voiced by: Haruka Tomatsu
Millia (ミリア, Miria) / Hatsuki (髪鬼)
Voiced by: Mayu Mineda
Sumeragi (皇鬼)
Voiced by: Daisuke Hirakawa
Todoroki (轟鬼)
Voiced by: Misato Murai
Juserino (ジュセリノ, Juserino)
Voiced by: Yurika Kubo
Atla (アトラ, Atora)
Voiced by: Yuko Suzuhana
Chūki (忠鬼)
Voiced by: Taku Yashiro
Kyūketsuki (吸血鬼)
Voiced by: Satoshi Mikami
Kiki (樹鬼)
Voiced by: Mugihito
Sleep Ogre (惰眠鬼, Daminki)
Voiced by: Masumi Tazawa
Hiko (彦)
Voiced by: Toshiyuki Morikawa
Noburega (ノブレガ)
Voiced by: Shunsuke Takeuchi

== Media ==
=== Manga ===
No.	Original release date	Original ISBN	English release date	English ISBN
1	February 17, 2016	978-4-06-392514-2	June 29, 2021	978-1-646513-39-0
1. "The Princess and the Imported Peach"; 2. "The Former Princess and the Rabbit Girl"; 3. "The Peach and I"
2	October 17, 2016	978-4-06-392550-0	August 31, 2021	978-1-646513-40-6
4. "Smiles and Impulses"; 5. "Ogres and Humans"; 6. "Races and Places"; 7. "The Peach and the Peach"
3	June 16, 2017	978-4-06-392589-0	October 19, 2021	978-1-646513-41-3
8. "The Witch and the Magic"; 9. "Hawthorn and the Truth"; 10. "Ideals and Reality"; 11. "Sally and Ogres"
4	February 16, 2018	978-4-06-510928-1	December 21, 2021	978-1-646513-42-0
12. "Resolution and Departure"; 13. "The Harefolk and the Former Ogre"; 14. "Heaven and True Identity"; 15. "Carrot and Sally"
5	October 17, 2018	978-4-06-513318-7	February 1, 2022	978-1-646513-43-7
16. "Ogres and Momotaro"; 17. "Ogres and Meetings"; 18. "Tournaments and Prize Money"; 19. "Sally and Crossroads"
6	June 17, 2019	978-4-06-515947-7	April 5, 2022	978-1-646513-44-4
20. "The Hand Taken and One Not Taken"; 21. "Meki and Carrot"; 22. "Comrades and Comrades"; 23. "The Ravages of War and Hatred"
7	February 17, 2020	978-4-06-518539-1	June 14, 2022	978-1-646513-45-1
24. ""Mikoto" and the Past"; 25. "The Weakest and the Coolest"; 26. "Heart of the Peach and Heart of a Man"; 27. "Harefolk and Harefolk"
8	August 17, 2020	978-4-06-520362-0	September 27, 2022	978-1-646515-27-1
28. "The Overlord and the Ogre Horn"; 29. "Monsters and Cravings"; 30. "Clownery and Cowards"; 31. "The Nameless and the Rest of the Dream"; 32. "Those Who Hunt and Those Who Kill"; 33. "Krow and the Overlord"
9	February 17, 2021	978-4-06-521947-8	November 29, 2022	978-1-646515-28-8
34. "Mikoto and Swords"; 35. "Mikoto and Ogre-Slaying"; 36. "Mikoto and Mikoto"; 37. "Momotaro and the Ogre God"; 38. "Mikoto and the Peach"; 39. "Parting and Journeys"
10	August 17, 2021	978-4-06-524136-3	February 21, 2023	978-1-646515-29-5
40. "Long Journeys and the Harmonious City"; 41. "Speeches and War"; 42. "Sally and the Princess"; 43. "Hawthorne and the Ogre God"; 44. "Enemies and Friends"; 45. "Hearts and Walls"
11	February 17, 2022	978-4-06-526466-9	May 16, 2023	978-1-646517-15-2
46. "Middle and Middle Ogres"; 47. "The Princesses and the Night Party"; 48. "Sisters and Succession"; 49. "Domencia and Ideas"; 50. "The Princess and the King"; 51. "Declarations of War and Restoration"
12	August 17, 2022	978-4-06-528504-6	August 8, 2023	978-1-646517-16-9
52. "Self-Defense and Alliances"; 53. "Memories of Carrot"; 54. "Mikoto and the Scheme"; 55. "Vengeance and Excuses"; 56. "Those Who Dwell Within the Heart"; 57. "Reunions and Resolve"
13	February 16, 2023	978-4-06-530670-3	November 7, 2023	978-1-646517-17-6
58. "Underground and Taboo"; 59. "Witch to Witch"; 60. "The Black Rabbit and the Zealot"; 61. "Krow and The One Who Waits"; 62. "Concepts and Intervention"; 63. "Jucerino and War"
14	August 17, 2023	978-4-06-532779-1	June 18, 2024	978-1-646519-06-4
64. "Menshinki and Zonshinki"; 65. "Chuki and Middle"; 66. "Middle and Humanity"; 67. "The Ogre God and the Peach Eye"; 68. "Legacy and Curses"; 69. "Silence and Rage"
15	March 15, 2024	978-4-06-535038-6	September 23, 2025	979-8-888774-55-7
70. "Knight and Knight"; 71. "Princess and Princess"; 72. "Lance and Shield"; 73. "True Feelings and Long-Held Desires"; 74. "Resignation and Optimism"; 75. "Promises and Parting"
16	September 17, 2024	978-4-06-536573-1	October 6, 2026	979-8-888775-40-0
76. "Revenge and Destruction"; 77. "Divisions and Unity"; 78. "Destruction and Regeneration"; 79. "Promises and Revenge"; 80. "The Strongest and the Evilest"; 81. "Sally and Mikoto"

=== Anime ===
An anime television series adaptation of the remake version was announced on August 7, 2020. The series is animated by Asahi Production and directed by Shigeru Ueda, with Keiichirō Ōchi handling series composition, Satomi Kurita and Masato Katō handling the character designs, and Takaaki Nakahashi composing the series' music. It aired from July 1 to September 16, 2021, on Tokyo MX, BS NTV, and AT-X. Q-MHz produced the opening theme song, "Dark spiral journey" featuring Yuko Suzuhana, while Mitei no Hanashi performed the ending theme song, "Yoru o Koeru Ashioto" (Footsteps Across the Night). Crunchyroll streamed the series outside of Asia. Medialink has licensed the series in Southeast Asia and South Asia, and is streaming it on their Ani-One YouTube channel, but this series is only viewable on their YouTube channel with Ani-One Ultra Membership scheme. Ani-One will upload this anime to their YouTube channel from July 1 for Hong Kong, Taiwan and Macau and from July 15 for other Asian regions.

==== Episode list ====
The series is released in two different versions: the "On air version" (オンエア版, On'ea-ban) which airs in an anachronical order that rearranges the chronological order of the original story, while the "Time series version" (時系列版, Jikeiretsu-ban) (which is exclusively released on the Japanese streaming platform dAnime Store) follows the chronological order of the original story.

On air version	Time series version	Title (Note: All English titles are taken from Crunchyroll.)	Directed by (Note: Information is taken from the ending credits of each episode.)	Written by	Storyboarded by	Original release date	Original release date
1	2	"The Ex-Princess and the Harefolk"; Transliteration: "Moto Hime to Ujin" (Japanese: 元姫と卯人)	Shigeru Ueda	Keiichirō Ōchi	Shigeru Ueda	July 1, 2021 (Note: This episode was pre-screened on June 20, 2021.)	July 8, 2021
2	3	"Ogres and Humans"; Transliteration: "Oni to Ningen" (Japanese: 鬼と人間)	Masayuki Iimura	Keiichirō Ōchi	Akira Oguro	July 8, 2021	July 15, 2021
3	9	"Sally and a Crossroads"; Transliteration: "Sarī to Kiro" (Japanese: サリーと岐路)	Masato Suzuki	Keiichirō Ōchi	Hidetoshi Namura	July 15, 2021	August 26, 2021
4	1	"The Princess and the Peach"; Transliteration: "Hime to Momo" (Japanese: 姫と桃)	Akira Koremoto	Keiichirō Ōchi	Shigeru Ueda	July 22, 2021	July 1, 2021
5	7	"Frau and the Vampire"; Transliteration: "Furau to Kyūketsuki" (Japanese: フラウと吸血鬼)	Takaaki Ishiyama	Kazuhiko Inukai (Note: Credited in the TV version but not in the streaming version.); Keiichirō Ōchi (Note: Credited in the streaming version but not in the TV version.)	Akira Oguro	July 29, 2021	August 12, 2021
6	8	"Carrot and Millia"; Transliteration: "Kyarotto to Miria" (Japanese: キャロットとミリア)	Hisaya Takabayashi	Kazuhiko Inukai	Yasuo Ejima	August 5, 2021	August 19, 2021
7	4	"Species and Belonging"; Transliteration: "Shuzoku to Ibasho" (Japanese: 種族と居場所)	Masayuki Iimura	Keiichirō Ōchi	Hidetoshi Namura	August 12, 2021	July 22, 2021
8	10	"Companion and Companion"; Transliteration: "Nakama to Nakama" (Japanese: 仲間と仲間)	Sumito Sasaki	Kazuhiko Inukai	Akira Oguro	August 19, 2021	September 2, 2021
9	12	"Mikoto and Mikoto"; Transliteration: "Mikoto to Mikoto" (Japanese: ミコトとミコト)	Masato Suzuki	Keiichirō Ōchi	Takaharu Ozaki	August 26, 2021	September 16, 2021
10	11	"Horror and Resentment"; Transliteration: "Senka to Urami" (Japanese: 戦禍と恨み)	Takaaki Ishiyama	Kazuhiko Inukai	Akira Oguro	September 2, 2021	September 9, 2021
11	5	"Ideals and Reality"; Transliteration: "Risō to Genjitsu" (Japanese: 理想と現実)	Takahiro Ōtsuka	Kazuhiko Inukai	Hidetoshi Namura	September 9, 2021	July 29, 2021
12	6	"Resolutions and Goodbyes"; Transliteration: "Ketsui to Wakare" (Japanese: 決意と別れ)	Shigeru Ueda	Keiichirō Ōchi	Shigeru Ueda	September 16, 2021	August 5, 2021

=== Game ===
A video game adaptation, Peach Boy Riverside Battle Saga, was launched on the HTML5 game platform, G123, on July 1, 2021.
