= When Will Ayumu Make His Move? =

Japanese manga series

- First tankōbon volume cover, featuring Ayumu Tanaka (left) and Urushi Yaotome (center)

それでも歩は寄せてくる (Sore de mo Ayumu wa Yosete Kuru)
- Genre: Romantic comedy; Slice of life
- Manga

Shōgi no Yatsu
- Written by: Sōichirō Yamamoto
- Published by: Self-published (webcomic)
- Original run: April 22, 2018 – November 20, 2018
- Manga
- Written by: Sōichirō Yamamoto
- Published by: Kodansha
- English publisher: NA: Kodansha USA
- Magazine: Weekly Shōnen Magazine
- Original run: March 6, 2019 – November 15, 2023
- Volumes: 17
- Anime television series
- Directed by: Mirai Minato
- Produced by: Shinichi Nakamura; Takahiro Suzuki; Hayato Kaneko; Yoshiyuki Shioya; Masahiko Itou
- Written by: Deko Akao
- Music by: Shun Narita
- Studio: Silver Link
- Licensed by: Sentai Filmworks
- Original network: TBS, BS-TBS
- Original run: July 8, 2022 – September 23, 2022
- Episodes: 12
- icon

When Will Ayumu Make His Move? (Japanese: それでも歩は寄せてくる, Hepburn: Sore de mo Ayumu wa Yosete Kuru; lit. "Even So, Ayumu Approaches") (Note: Ayumu is written with the character 歩 (also read as fu), abbreviation for the shogi piece fuhyō (歩兵; "infantry"), equivalent to pawn in chess.) is a Japanese manga series written and illustrated by Sōichirō Yamamoto. The series originally began as a webcomic titled Shōgi no Yatsu (将棋のやつ; lit. "Shogi Guy"), which was published in 2018. The manga was later serialized in Kodansha's Weekly Shōnen Magazine from March 2019 to November 2023. An anime television series adaptation by Silver Link aired from July to September 2022.

== Plot ==
Ayumu Tanaka is a first-year high school student who is a member of the shogi club. In love with his senpai, Urushi Yaotome, he plans to confess his feelings once he beats her in a game of shogi. However, because he is a beginner, she wins every time. Urushi meanwhile suspects Ayumu has a crush on her and unsuccessfully attempts to get him to admit it.

== Characters ==
Ayumu Tanaka (田中 歩, Tanaka Ayumu)
Voiced by: Hiroki Yasumoto (2019 commercial), Yoshimasa Hosoya (2021 commercial), Yōhei Azakami (anime)
A first-year high school student, Ayumu is a member of the shogi club.
Urushi Yaotome (八乙女 うるし, Yaotome Urushi)
Voiced by: Yuka Iguchi (2019 commercial), Konomi Kohara (2021 commercial), Kanna Nakamura (anime)
A second-year student, Urushi is Ayumu's senpai in the shogi club.
Takeru Kakuryu (角竜 タケル, Kakuryū Takeru)
Voiced by: Tsubasa Gouden (anime)
Takeru is a first-year student who is one of Ayumu's childhood friends. Like Ayumu, he is also proficient in kendo. A member of the library committee, he has a crush on Sakurako.
Sakurako Mikage (御影 桜子, Mikage Sakurako)
Voiced by: Hina Yōmiya (anime)
Sakurako is a first-year student who is one of Ayumu's childhood friends. A member of the library committee, she is a shy girl who likes to hypnotize Takeru and is unaware that he has a crush on her.
Rin Kagawa (香川 凛, Kagawa Rin)
Voiced by: Haruna Mikawa (anime)
Rin is a student who was Ayumu and Takeru's kōhai in their middle school kendo club. She later attends the same high school as them when they become second-years.
Maki (マキ)
Voiced by: Kana Hanazawa (anime)
Maki is a second-year student who is Urushi's best friend. She like to tease Urushi concerning Ayumu and is a fan of their relationship.

== Media ==
=== Manga ===
Written and illustrated by Sōichirō Yamamoto, When Will Ayumu Make His Move? originally began as a webcomic titled Shōgi no Yatsu, which Yamamoto posted on his Twitter account from April 22 to November 20, 2018. When Will Ayumu Make His Move? was later serialized in Kodansha's Weekly Shōnen Magazine from March 6, 2019, to November 15, 2023. Kodansha collected its chapters into seventeen tankōbon volumes from July 4, 2019, to December 15, 2023.

In March 2021, Kodansha USA announced that they licensed the manga for English release in North America.

==== Volumes ====
No.	Original release date	Original ISBN	English release date	English ISBN
1	July 4, 2019	978-4-06-516105-0	September 21, 2021 (print); October 19, 2021 (digital)	978-1-64-651349-9 (print); 978-1-63-699487-1 (digital)
Chapters 1–14
2	October 17, 2019	978-4-06-517207-0	December 7, 2021 (print); November 23, 2021 (digital)	978-1-64-651350-5 (print); 978-1-63-699582-3 (digital)
Chapters 15–28
3	February 17, 2020	978-4-06-518457-8	January 18, 2022	978-1-64-651351-2 (print); 978-1-63-699680-6 (digital)
Chapters 29–41
4	June 17, 2020	978-4-06-519298-6	March 8, 2022 (print); March 1, 2022 (digital)	978-1-64-651352-9 (print); 978-1-63-699694-3 (digital)
Chapters 42–54
5	October 16, 2020	978-4-06-521014-7	May 3, 2022	978-1-64-651353-6 (print); 978-1-68-491284-1 (digital)
Chapters 55–68
6	January 15, 2021	978-4-06-521014-7	July 12, 2022 (print); July 5, 2022 (digital)	978-1-64-651530-1 (print); 978-1-68-491318-3 (digital)
Chapters 69–80
7	April 16, 2021	978-4-06-522888-3	September 6, 2022	978-1-64-651531-8 (print); 978-1-68-491618-4 (digital)
Chapters 81–94
8	July 16, 2021	978-4-06-524013-7	November 8, 2022	978-1-64-651532-5 (print); 978-1-68-491726-6 (digital)
Chapters 95–108
9	October 15, 2021	978-4-06-525144-7	January 10, 2023	978-1-64-651616-2 (print); 978-1-68-491833-1 (digital)
Chapters 109–121
10	January 17, 2022	978-4-06-526608-3	March 28, 2023 (print); March 14, 2023 (digital)	978-1-64-651661-2 (print); 978-1-68-491950-5 (digital)
Chapters 122–135
11	April 15, 2022	978-4-06-527538-2	May 16, 2023	978-1-64-651739-8 (print); 979-8-88-933000-4 (digital)
Chapters 136–149
12	July 15, 2022	978-4-06-528499-5	July 18, 2023	978-1-64-651740-4 (print); 979-8-88-933115-5 (digital)
Chapters 150–161
13	November 17, 2022	978-4-06-529709-4	September 26, 2023 (print); September 19, 2023 (digital)	978-1-64-651915-6 (print); 979-8-88-933234-3 (digital)
Chapters 162–174
14	March 16, 2023	978-4-06-530971-1	November 21, 2023	978-1-64-651916-3 (print); 979-8-88-933307-4 (digital)
Chapters 175–187
15	July 14, 2023	978-4-06-532191-1	April 16, 2024	979-8-88-877078-8 (print); 979-8-88-933543-6 (digital)
Chapters 188–200
16	October 17, 2023	978-4-06-533248-1	July 16, 2024	979-8-88-877287-4 (print); 979-8-88-933708-9 (digital)
Chapters 201–213
17	December 15, 2023	978-4-06-533936-7	October 15, 2024	979-8-88-877288-1 (print); 979-8-89-478141-9 (digital)
Chapters 214–225

=== Anime ===
An anime television series adaptation was announced on January 8, 2021. The series was animated by Silver Link and directed by Mirai Minato, with Deko Akao overseeing the series' scripts, and Kazuya Hirata designing the characters. It aired from July 8 to September 23, 2022, on TBS and BS-TBS. (Note: TBS listed the series premiere at 25:28 on July 7, 2022, which is July 8 at 1:28 a.m.) The opening theme song is "Kakehiki wa Poker Face" (駆け引きはポーカーフェイス) by Kana Hanazawa, while the ending theme song is "50 Centi" (50センチ) by Kanna Nakamura. Sentai Filmworks has licensed the series.

==== Episodes ====
No.	Title (Note: All English titles are taken from Hidive.)	Directed by (Note: Information is taken from the ending credits of each episode.)	Written by	Storyboarded by	Original release date
1	"You Are Cute, Senpai"; Transliteration: "Senpai wa Kawaiinode" (Japanese: センパイは可愛いので)	Mirai Minato	Deko Akao	Mirai Minato	July 8, 2022
Ayumu Tanaka and Urushi Yaotome are the only members of their school's shogi club. During their first match, Ayumu tells Urushi she is cute. Suspecting he has a crush on her, Urushi attempts to make him admit it by offering him a hug and later a kiss, to no avail, as Ayumu has promised himself to only confess once he beats her. Sometime later, Urushi sees Ayumu being invited into the kendo club, but becomes relieved when he tells her that he will stay with her. After one of her friends ditches joining the club after getting a boyfriend, Urushi asks Ayumu what would he do in that situation. His answer makes Urushi think that he would like her as a girlfriend, but Ayumu remains steady on his promise. Sometime later, despite hating PE, Urushi attends class after being encouraged by Ayumu. After continuing to fall victim to Ayumu's flattery, Urushi tries to harden herself, but succumbs when Ayumu comes close to her to see her side of the shogi board. After school, Ayumu invites Urushi to share his umbrella on their way home. Delighted, she accepts and tells him that they may share it again someday.
2	"I Want to Make You Happy, Senpai"; Transliteration: "Yorokonde Hoshīnode" (Japanese: よろこんでほしいので)	Yūshi Ibe	Deko Akao	Mirai Minato	July 15, 2022
On Sports Day, Urushi's friend Maki teases her for being so close to Ayumu. During his competitions, Ayumu does well, prompting some boys to approach him to join their sporting club. However, Urushi tells them about their shogi club, but they deny even knowing that club existed. Ayumu tells a depressed Urushi that he will get their club noticed and attract potential members. When she says that would make her happy, Ayumu becomes even more motivated. They then nervously hold each other during the three-legged race, which results in constant tripping. Later, Ayumu carries Urushi towards the referee after he got a challenge in a slip of paper, flustering her. Later in the library, Sakurako Mikage hypnotizes Takeru Kakuryu into joining the shogi club after Ayumu asks him, but they realize they will not be able to walk home together. After school, Ayumu tells Urushi that he got another member for their club. They celebrate with taiyaki, and Urushi embarrasses herself after she says she likes the shogi piece that bears Ayumu's name, flattering him. Elsewhere, Sakurako and Takeru enjoy some taiyaki together.
3	"I Want to Go on a First Date, Senpai"; Transliteration: "Hatsu Dēto ga Shitainode" (Japanese: 初デートがしたいので)	Haruka Hirota	Deko Akao	Kubo Shiba	July 22, 2022
Urushi attempts to get Ayumu to notice her new hairstyle. After Sakurako takes Takeru away with her, Ayumu exhibits jealousy to Urushi for complimenting Takeru. In the library, Takeru asks Sakurako if she likes anyone, which she denies. When she asks him the same question, he lies to her and says he does not like anyone. This causes them to promise to help each other out after they have found love. Sometime later, Ayumu asks Urushi on a date. After she does not refuse, Ayumu looks for her in their culture festival, and finds her selling yakisoba. As such, he decides to help her. Now free, Urushi caves in on the date, and they have a great time. After Maki finds and teases them, Urushi admits that it is her first date, but Ayumu expresses his joy for having the honor. They then enter a haunted house where Urushi is shocked when Ayumu holds her hand. Takeru becomes nervous while hiding in the haunted house with Sakurako, so he bursts out yelling, scaring Urushi. Afterwards, Urushi says she enjoyed herself, prompting Ayumu to ask her to call him by his first name, which embarrasses her.
4	"I Want to Spend Time Together, Senpai"; Transliteration: "Issho ni Sugoshitainode" (Japanese: 一緒に過ごしたいので)	Misaki Nishimoto	Yumi Suzumori	Mirai Minato	July 29, 2022
Ayumu overreacts when Urushi tries to scare him, leaving her shaken. He then places Urushi in a box after she says that she is cold. As they clean their clubroom, Urushi finds an old DVD player. She asks Ayumu if he has DVDs. Initially believing he is hiding an adult film, she is relieved when it turns out to be a horror movie. Urushi agrees to start a match with less pieces, enabling Ayumu to defeat her. Before he can say anything, however, a teacher arrives and spoils their moment. Afterwards, as Takeru walks home with Sakurako, they agree to spend their Christmas together. Later, Ayumu tells Urushi he meant to say that he wishes to beat her in a fair game, and wishes her a happy New Year, embarrassing her. Ayumu feels down, however, as he was unable to ask her out. On New Year's Day, Maki ditches Urushi after they run into Ayumu at the temple. Ayumu untimely asks Urushi to spend Christmas with him. They then receive their luck, and Urushi reveals she wished for their club to become official. As such, Ayumu says he asked for her wish to come true.
5	"I Want to Know More, Senpai"; Transliteration: "Motto Shiritainode" (Japanese: もっと知りたいので)	Masahiro Hosoda	Deko Akao	Yūichi Nihei	August 5, 2022
Urushi dreams of Ayumu nearly kissing her. They go to a library the next day, where Ayumu buys shogi books, and learns of Urushi's favorite manga. After Ayumu asks her if she thinks about him, an embarrassed Urushi takes him to a restaurant, where the chef tells him some of her childhood anecdotes. Near Urushi's house, they run into Kin, her cat. As he says pets resemble their owners, he begins calling Kin all sorts of cute adjectives, making Urushi think he is saying them to her. They nearly kiss when he catches Urushi after Kin jumped on her. Elsewhere, Takeru and Sakurako are watching a movie where Sakurako imitates the female protagonist. However, Sakurako fails to kiss Takeru after the final scene differs from the ending of the book the movie is based on. Outside, she asks him if he would have preferred the other ending, which Takeru confirms. That night, Urushi accidentally video calls Ayumu. As they talk, she becomes flustered after Ayumu says he feels as if they were together. Urushi hangs up after he falls asleep, but is too embarrassed to sleep herself.
6	"I Want to Get It From You, Senpai"; Transliteration: "Senpai Kara Moraitainode" (Japanese: センパイからもらいたいので)	Yamato Ōuchi	Yumi Suzumori	Kōji Sawai	August 12, 2022
Urushi gets Ayumu chocolate for Valentine's Day. After teasing her, Maki tells Urushi to find the perfect moment. Later, Sakurako prevents Takeru from attending the shogi club by seizing the chocolate she gave him. Meanwhile, Urushi practices her gift presentation. However, she gets too nervous when she sees an uneasy Ayumu. She tries to slip the chocolate into his bag, but she trips and reveals it instead. She then nervously gives it to Ayumu, delighting him. Elsewhere, Sakurako gives Takeru a chocolate with a heart, which he says he likes after eating it. Sometime later, they all study for their exams. Sakurako teases Takeru by whispering to his ear. Urushi asks Ayumu if they are dating, pointing out how obvious Sakurako's crush for Takeru is due to how close she comes to him. However, she comes too close to Ayumu herself, and backs down nervously. On White Day, Ayumu gives Urushi a gift. He then reveals that while he answered every question correctly during the exam, he placed it in the wrong column, meaning he has to take remedial class. He apologizes for being unable to play, disappointing Urushi.
7	"I Can't Just Quit, Senpai"; Transliteration: "Yameru Wake ni wa Ikanainode" (Japanese: 辞めるわけにはいかないので)	Haruka Hirota	Deko Akao	Kubo Shiba	August 19, 2022
Ayumu and Urushi go with Takeru and Sakurako to see which classroom they are in this year, and Urushi is happy that she shares the same classroom number with Ayumu. Later on, Urushi runs into Maki's friends, Miku and Hinano. The next day, Urushi and Ayumu prepare flyers to invite people to their club, as Ayumu remembers when he joined the club a year prior. As he walked with Takeru to join the kendo club, Takeru told him what love felt like. Suddenly, a flyer flew towards his face as Urushi apologized, resulting in him immediately falling in love with her. Back in the present, a girl named Rin Kagawa appears, intending to take both Ayumu and Takeru back into the kendo club. Ayumu agrees to a bout where he will join the kendo club if he loses. As they set off, Urushi remembers all they have gone through, and realizes that even if she officializes her club, it will not matter if Ayumu is not with her. As such, she rushes to see the match, where Ayumu delights her when he says he won. Having lost, Rin agrees to join the shogi club.
8	"It's a Role I Refuse to Relinquish, Senpai"; Transliteration: "Yuzurenai Yakumenanode" (Japanese: 譲れない役目なので)	Yūsuke Sekine	Yumi Suzumori	Hiromitsu Kanazawa	August 26, 2022
After the club becomes official, Urushi has Ayumu play against Rin, becoming shocked when Rin wins. She then becomes nervous when she believes Rin will take the club presidency from her if she defeats her. However, she receives encouragement from Ayumu, which enables her to win. Later on, Urushi asks Ayumu if he would have preferred being by themselves in the club. However, his answer flusters her, so she tries to get him back, but Rin interrupts her. Rin later asks Urushi if she likes Ayumu, which she denies, but says she would like it if he liked her back. After she gets confirmation from Takeru, Rin confronts Ayumu. After he says he did leave the kendo club for Urushi, Rin remembers how she wanted to beat Ayumu at kendo in order to confess to him. As such, she says she will help him improve at shogi in order to confess. Afterwards, Urushi holds a party for the new members, and Urushi thanks Ayumu for his help in making the club official. Urushi then approaches him, but only to remove a petal from his neck, embarrassing them both after he says he thought she would hug him.
9	"I Want to Make Memories, Senpai"; Transliteration: "Omoide o Tsukuritainode" (Japanese: 思い出を作りたいので)	Masahiro Hosoda	Deko Akao	Kubo Shiba	September 2, 2022
Ayumu asks Urushi if she wants to hang out during the last day of Golden Week. However, she is disappointed to learn it will be a club outing. Sometime later, Takeru and Sakurako are looking for four-leaf clovers, which leads to an awkward moment after Takeru finds one. The next day, while Urushi waits for Ayumu and Rin, she is approached by Maki, Miku, and Hinano. Once Ayumu and Rin finally arrive, they head to the arcade where they meet up with Takeru. After they play some games, Ayumu and Urushi have their pictures taken in a photo booth. At school, Sakurako informs Takeru another boy told her that he likes her. When she wonders how does it feel to like someone, he explains it. Recalling their previous outing, Sakurako realizes she has a crush on Takeru.
10	"I Can't Back Down, Senpai"; Transliteration: "Shirizokenai Shōbunanode" (Japanese: 退けない勝負なので)	Yamato Ōuchi	Yumi Suzumori	Kōji Sawai	September 9, 2022
When Ayumu and Urushi arrive at Urushi's house, they have a conversation about Urushi's father. Just as Ayumu is about to leave, Urushi's father shows up, which causes Urushi to nervously escort Ayumu to the restaurant. There, she reveals the reason she was nervous was due to her father giving up his dream of being a professional shogi player. Once Urushi's father finds them, Ayumu challenges him to a game of shogi, which her father wins. After the game, Urushi's mother reveals the real reason why her father quit, much to his chagrin. At school, Urushi informs Ayumu and Rin she will attending the school trip for third-years next week. Rin decides to train Ayumu while Urushi is away. After school, Urushi hangs out with Maki, Miku and Hinano, while Ayumu hangs out with Rin. Later that night, Ayumu meets up with Urushi and he gives her a good luck charm before she leaves the next day.
11	"I Want to Get Stronger, Senpai"; Transliteration: "Tsuyoku Natte Itainode" (Japanese: 強くなっていたいので)	Yūshi Ibe	Yumi Suzumori	Mirai Minato	September 16, 2022
During the class trip, Urushi, Maki, Miku, and Hinano visit several locations in Nara. Meanwhile in school, Ayumu, Rin, and Takeru have a meeting in the club room. Ayumu then continues his training with Rin. Back in Nara, while in their hotel room, Urushi and Maki play a game of shogi. Afterwards, Urushi sends a text message to Ayumu. On the third day, the girls hang out together. Later that night, Urushi awaits having a phone call with Ayumu.
12	"I Want to Win and Tell You How I Feel, Senpai"; Transliteration: "Katte Tsutaetainode" (Japanese: 勝って伝えたいので)	Mirai Minato	Deko Akao	Mirai Minato	September 23, 2022
Urushi and Ayumu have a conversation over the phone. On the last day of the trip, Urushi unknowingly loses her good luck charm after she bumps into a stranger. Just as the girls are ready to leave, Urushi notices her charm is missing and she goes on a search to find it. When she finally does, Urushi realizes she likes Ayumu, much to Maki's delight. Meanwhile, Rin and Takeru tell Ayumu he is ready to challenge Urushi. During lunch, Rin regrets not telling Ayumu she has a crush on him. When Urushi returns, she gives the club their souvenirs. Later, Takeru and Sakurako have library duty, while Rin excuses herself so Ayumu can confess his feelings to Urushi after he finally defeats her with a four-piece handicap. However, he decides to wait until he is better than her.

== Reception ==
In 2020, the manga was nominated for the 6th Next Manga Awards and placed 3rd out of the 50 nominees with 19,182 votes.
