= Fudatsuki no Kyōko-chan =

Japanese manga series

- First tankōbon volume cover, Kenji (left) and Kyōko Fudatsuki (right)

ふだつきのキョーコちゃん
- Genre: Comedy
- Manga
- Written by: Sōichirō Yamamoto
- Published by: Shogakukan
- Imprint: Shōnen Sunday Comics Special
- Magazine: Monthly Shōnen Sunday
- Original run: August 12, 2013 – June 11, 2016
- Volumes: 7
- icon

Fudatsuki no Kyōko-chan (ふだつきのキョーコちゃん) is a Japanese manga series written and illustrated by Sōichirō Yamamoto. It was serialized in Shogakukan's shōnen manga magazine Monthly Shōnen Sunday from August 2013 to June 2016, with its chapters collected in seven tankōbon volumes.

== Plot ==
Kenji Fudatsuki is a high school student who is a delinquent and seemingly has a sister complex as he is very protective of his sister Kyōko, fixing her hair ribbon, and not allowing anyone to get near her. In reality, he has a crush on a classmate named Hibino. Furthermore, the reason why Kenji is always by Kyōko's side is due to her being a jiangshi who regularly needs to feed on his blood, with her ribbon serving as a talisman to prevent her from attacking people. Keiji is determined to find a way to look out for Kyōko while overcoming his reputation so he can confess his feelings to Hibino.

== Publication ==
Written and illustrated by Sōichirō Yamamoto, Fudatsuki no Kyōko-chan was serialized in Shogakukan's shōnen manga magazine Monthly Shōnen Sunday from August 12, 2013, to June 11, 2016. Shogakukan collected its chapters in seven tankōbon volumes, released from January 10, 2014, to July 12, 2016.

=== Volumes ===
No.	Japanese release date	Japanese ISBN
1	January 10, 2014	978-4-09-124597-7
2	June 12, 2014	978-4-09-124760-5
3	November 12, 2014	978-4-09-126650-7
4	April 10, 2015	978-4-09-127389-5
5	September 11, 2015	978-4-09-127541-7
6	February 12, 2016	978-4-09-127018-4
7	July 12, 2016	978-4-09-127353-6
