= Mayu Mineda =

Japanese voice actress and singer

- 峯田 茉優
- Born: 28 November 1997 (age 28)
- Occupations: Voice actress; singer
- Years active: 2018–present
- Agent: VIMS
- Notable work: Kanako Mitsue in Stars Align; Meguru Hachimiya in The Idolmaster Shiny Colors; Millia in Peach Boy Riverside; Higuruma in In the Heart of Kunoichi Tsubaki
- Musical career
- Genres: J-Pop
- Instrument: Vocals
- Years active: 2023–present
- Label: Dreamusic
- Website: dreamusic.co.jp/artist/minedamayu/

Mayu Mineda (峯田 茉優, Mineda Mayu; born 28 November 1997) is a Japanese voice actress and singer from Nagano Prefecture, affiliated with VIMS. She is known for portraying Kanako Mitsue in Stars Align, Meguru Hachimiya in The Idolmaster Shiny Colors, Millia in Peach Boy Riverside, and Higuruma in In the Heart of Kunoichi Tsubaki.

== Biography ==
Mayu Mineda, a native of Nagano Prefecture, was born on 28 November 1997. As a junior high school student, she was head of her school's art club, went to school with future voice actress Nanami Atsugi, discovered an interest in anime while watching MegaMan NT Warrior, bought a character CD of Azusa Nakano (the main protagonist of K-On) and felt that two of the characters Aoi Yūki was voicing – Diane from The Seven Deadly Sins and Madoka Kaname from Puella Magi Madoka Magica – "fit perfectly together" despite having "completely different personalities". She became interested in voice acting because of her interest in anime and acting, the latter of which was inspired by her family's visits to Shiki Theatre Company musicals.

She was educated at Japan Narration Acting Institute, and she joined VIMS in 2017. In July 2019, she was cast as Kanako Mitsue in Stars Align. In April 2020, she was cast as Shaei Miyama in A Certain Scientific Railgun T. In May 2021, she was cast as Millia in Peach Boy Riverside. In March 2022, she was cast as Higuruma in In the Heart of Kunoichi Tsubaki.

Mineda voices Meguru Hachimiya in The Idolmaster Shiny Colors, a spin-off of The Idolmaster franchise. As part of the franchise, she performed in several of Illumination Stars' singles, two of which reached the Top 5 in the Oricon Singles Chart.

She and Ryōta Suzuki co-hosted the AnimeJapan 2021 livestream on 18 February. Her debut mini album, "Who Are Me?", was released from Dreamusic on 2 August 2023.

== Filmography ==
=== Anime television ===
==== 2018 ====
- Merc Storia: Mukiryoku no Shōnen to Bin no Naka no Shōjo, child
- Ms. Vampire Who Lives in My Neighborhood, girl A

==== 2019 ====
- Arifureta: From Commonplace to World's Strongest, Taeko Sugawara
- Beyblade Burst GT, spectator
- Domestic Girlfriend, female student B
- Dr. Stone, child
- Fire Force, Sister Sakura
- Let's! Gonjirō, staff
- Stars Align, Kanako Mitsue
- Wasteful Days of High School Girls, students
- We Never Learn, Hazuki Yuiga

==== 2020 ====
- A Certain Scientific Railgun T, Shaei Miyama
- Ahiru no Sora, Akiyoshi
- Mewkledreamy, Director Oshio
- Monster Girl Doctor, fairy
- Genie Family 2020, Mihoshi Amanogawa
- Saikyō Kamizmode, Rin Tanba

==== 2021 ====
- Peach Boy Riverside, Millia

==== 2022 ====
- In the Heart of Kunoichi Tsubaki, Higuruma

==== 2023 ====
- Sacrificial Princess and the King of Beasts, Princess Alba
- Synduality: Noir, Kanata (young)

==== 2025 ====
- Inexpressive Kashiwada and Expressive Oota, Odajima-san

=== Animated film ===
==== 2020 ====
- Monster Strike the Movie: Lucifer - Zetsubō no Yoake, Orane

=== Video games ===
==== 2018 ====
- Brown Dust, Eldora, Sui
- Hentai Shōjo: Formation Girls, Masumi Ōyama
- Kurokishi to Shiro no Maou, Elrune
- Phantom of the Kill, Neil

==== 2019 ====
- Gunvolt Chronicles: Luminous Avenger iX, RoRo
- Kingdom of Heroes, Hildegard
- Monster Strike, Orane
- Project NOAH, Sakiya Momohara
- Kōya no Kotobuki Hikōtai: Ōzora no Take Off Girls!, Ritta

==== 2020 ====
- BraveSword X BlazeSoul, Luisette
- Girls' Frontline, Magal (Micro Galil), Gr VP70
- Magia Record, Suzuka Sakuya
- World Flipper, Samasa

==== 2021 ====
- Caligula2, Key
- Last Period, Clever
- The Idolmaster Shiny Colors, Meguru Hachimiya

==== 2022 ====
- Alchemist Garden, Chelmy
- Gunvolt Chronicles: Luminous Avenger iX 2, Roro

==== 2023 ====
- Grim Guardians: Demon Purge, Kasumi Sakaguchi

=== Other ===
==== 2024 ====
- VOICEPEAK, Miyamai Moca
- Synthesizer V AI, Miyamai Moca
