= Saint Cecilia and Pastor Lawrence =

Japanese manga series

- First tankōbon volume cover

白聖女と黒牧師 (Shiro Seijo to Kuro Bokushi)
- Genre: Fantasy; Romantic comedy
- Manga
- Written by: Hazano Kazutake
- Published by: Kodansha
- English publisher: NA: Kodansha USA
- Magazine: Shōnen Magazine R; (April 20, 2017 – January 20, 2023); Monthly Magazine Base; (February 20, 2023 – present)
- Original run: April 20, 2017 – present
- Volumes: 13
- Anime television series
- Directed by: Sumie Noro
- Written by: Yuka Yamada
- Music by: Ruka Kawada
- Studio: Doga Kobo
- Licensed by: Crunchyroll; SEA: Plus Media Networks Asia
- Original network: Tokyo MX, GYT, GTV, BS11, ABC, CBC
- English network: SEA: Aniplus Asia; US: Crunchyroll Channel
- Original run: July 13, 2023 – September 28, 2023
- Episodes: 12
- icon

Saint Cecilia and Pastor Lawrence (Japanese: 白聖女と黒牧師, Hepburn: Shiro Seijo to Kuro Bokushi; lit. 'White Saint and Black Pastor') is a Japanese manga series written and illustrated by Hazano Kazutake. It was serialized in Kodansha's Shōnen Magazine R online magazine from April 2017 to January 2023, when the magazine was disbanded, and was transferred to the Monthly Magazine Base website in February 2023, with its chapters collected into thirteen tankōbon volumes as of February 2024. An anime television series adaptation produced by Doga Kobo aired from July to September 2023.

== Plot ==
Dwelling in the small outskirts of a peaceful town, Lawrence works as a local pastor for the townsfolk. When in need, he is responsible for guiding people to the church to visit the "Saint"—a symbol of good morals who heeds each parishioner's struggles and grants them sincere advice. Cecilia, a kind young girl, is tasked to fulfill this role; however, this tiresome job quickly exhausts her. That, paired with her hidden somnolent nature, often causes her to laze around the church. This leaves Lawrence to care for the church all by himself. While Cecilia sleeps in anticipation for her next visitor, Lawrence caters to her needs alongside performing the church's numerous responsibilities. Slowly but surely, they begin to form a comfortable and trusting friendship with one another. Lawrence accepting Cecilia's lax nature elates her while she grows accustomed to Lawrence's overly-doting nature. However, as the adoring and absent-minded saint's feelings for the dense and overly protective pastor progress past friendship, how will he respond?

== Characters ==
Cecilia (セシリア, Seshiria)
Voiced by: Hime Sawada (Japanese); Hannah Alyea (English)
Cecilia is a holy lady saint who publicly portrays herself as refined and dignified, but she only shows her languid demeanor when she is alone with Lawrence, whom she harbors a secret crush for.
Lawrence (ローレンス, Rōrensu)
Voiced by: Kaito Ishikawa (Japanese); Josh Bangle, Katelyn Barr (young) (English)
Lawrence is a local pastor of a small rural church who looks after Cecilia, though he is rather dense when she tries to flirt with him.
Abel (アベル, Aberu)
Voiced by: Haruki Ishiya (Japanese); Austin Tindle (English)
Abel Nordley is Lawrence's best friend who studied with Lawrence at the seminary. He is very outgoing and joyful, though he can be serious and insensitive sometimes.
Hazelita (ヘーゼリッタ, Hēzeritta)
Voiced by: Kanna Nakamura (Japanese); Sarah Roach (English)
Hazelita Aldridge is Giselbert's younger sister. She is a friend of Lawrence and Cecilia, and she has a love interest for Abel, who is her tutor.
Mel (メル, Meru)
Voiced by: Haruka Tomatsu (Japanese); Anastasia Muñoz (English)
Mel is a fortune teller.
Rebecca (レベッカ, Rebekka)
Voiced by: Mai Nakahara (Japanese); Erin Lundquist (English)
Rebecca is Erik's mother and a clothing shop owner.
Erik (エリック, Erikku)
Voiced by: Makoto Koichi (Japanese); Lexi Nieto (English)
Erik is Rebecca's son.
Giselbert (ギーゼルベルト, Gīzeruberuto)
Voiced by: Tomoaki Maeno (Japanese); Ben Balmaceda (English)
Giselbert Aldridge is Hazelita's older brother.
Frederica (フレデリカ, Furederika)
Voiced by: Reina Ueda (Japanese); Natalie Van Sistine (English)
Frederica is a holy lady saint from Hazelita and Giselbert's hometown who died after the wealthy family that kept her in custody only worshiped her holiness and refused to treat her like a mortal.

== Media ==
=== Manga ===
Written and illustrated by Hazano Kazutake, Saint Cecilia and Pastor Lawrence began serialization in Kodansha's Shōnen Magazine R online magazine on April 20, 2017. On January 20, 2023, the series was transferred to the Monthly Magazine Base website after the disbandment of Shōnen Magazine R. As of February 2024, thirteen tankōbon volumes have been published. In North America, Kodansha USA has licensed the series for English digital publication.

==== Volumes ====
No.	Original release date	Original ISBN	English release date	English ISBN
1	December 15, 2017	978-4-06-510598-6	June 22, 2021	978-1-63-699158-0
2	June 15, 2018	978-4-06-511598-5	July 27, 2021	978-1-63-699243-3
3	December 17, 2018	978-4-06-513827-4	August 31, 2021	978-1-63-699313-3
4	June 17, 2019	978-4-06-515948-4	September 28, 2021	978-1-63-699376-8
5	December 17, 2019	978-4-06-518029-7	October 26, 2021	978-1-63-699426-0
6	June 17, 2020	978-4-06-519980-0	November 23, 2021	978-1-63-699476-5
7	December 17, 2020	978-4-06-521785-6	December 28, 2021	978-1-63-699534-2
8	June 17, 2021	978-4-06-523226-2	January 25, 2022	978-1-63-699566-3
9	December 16, 2021	978-4-06-525795-1	July 19, 2022	978-1-68-491362-6
10	June 16, 2022	978-4-06-527773-7	January 31, 2023	978-1-68-491665-8
11	December 15, 2022	978-4-06-529747-6	July 25, 2023	979-8-88-933048-6
12	May 17, 2023	978-4-06-531391-6	October 31, 2023	979-8-88-933198-8
13	February 16, 2024	978-4-06-533417-1	July 30, 2024	979-8-88-933631-0

=== Anime ===
An anime television series adaptation was announced in June 2022. It is produced by Doga Kobo and directed by Sumie Noro, with scripts written by Yuka Yamada, character designs handled by Hiromi Nakagawa, and music composed by Ruka Kawada. The series was initially scheduled for April 2023, but was later delayed due to the COVID-19 pandemic affecting the production. It aired from July 13 to September 28, 2023, on Tokyo MX and other networks. The opening theme song is "Koi Sekai" (コイセカイ; lit. 'Love World'), performed by ClariS, and the ending theme song is "Toko Siesta" (トコシエスタ), performed by Sasanomaly. Crunchyroll is streaming the series. Aniplus Asia licensed the series in Southeast Asia.

==== Episodes ====
No.	Title	Directed by	Written by	Storyboarded by	Original release date
1	"The Relationship Between Them"; Transliteration: "Futari no Kankei" (Japanese: ふたりの関係)	Sumie Noro	Yuka Yamada	Sumie Noro	July 13, 2023
Lawrence is a local pastor of a small rural church, where he takes care of a holy lady saint named Cecilia. She is shown to have a hidden somnolent nature, while he is overprotective of her well-being. As Lawrence makes his rounds visiting homes in the village, Cecilia ends up doing a card trick for a group of children in lieu of performing a miracle. Lawrence and Cecilia briefly visit a clothing shop owner named Rebecca, who gives Cecilia a piece of clothing as an offering. Upon returning to the church, Lawrence scolds Cecilia for discouraging a little girl named Lily, who wishes to marry Lawrence when she is older. While making scones and black tea for Cecilia, Lawrence recalls how he first met her one year ago. The next day during breakfast, Lawrence tells Cecilia that he does not like shellfish because he got sick from eating too much of it during childhood. Lawrence and Cecilia shop at the flea market, where Cecilia ends up receiving many food samples as offerings from the various food vendors. They run under an awning when it starts raining, though they are lent an umbrella to share from a nice couple passing by. When the rain ironically lets up, Cecilia purposely faceplants into a puddle, prompting Lawrence to carry her back to their house. After Cecilia takes a bath, she finds that Lawrence has fallen asleep in the living room.
2	"The Things They Protect"; Transliteration: "Futari no Mamoru Mono" (Japanese: ふたりの守るもの)	Hiroaki Yoshikawa & Takashi Takeuchi	Yuka Yamada	Hiroaki Yoshikawa & Takashi Takeuchi	July 20, 2023
Lawrence's longtime friend Abel shows up unannounced, hoping to work alongside Cecilia and Lawrence at the church. It is revealed that Lawrence and Abel attended the same seminary in their youth. While Abel takes a stroll outside, Lawrence prepares to clean the church since a new moon is approaching. Cecilia confesses that she lazes around in front of Lawrence because he accepts her for who she is. After sending off Abel to make his rounds, Lawrence starts having a chronic headache, which worries Cecilia. Abel returns and realizes that Cecilia gave Lawrence too much divine protection. In the past, Lawrence's grandfather Oswell told him that lady saints are rumored to have the power of giving divine protection. Back in the present, Cecilia and Abel take Lawrence to rest in his bedroom. Abel mentions to Cecilia that giving Lawrence too much divine protection is actually harmful, though Abel is aware that Cecilia has a crush on Lawrence. Cecilia compliments and critiques Abel for being there for Lawrence. When Abel gets hungry, Cecilia struggles to make something in the kitchen. After waking up, Lawrence eats the mystery food without hesitation and enjoys the flavor, much to Cecilia's surprise. Lawrence tells Abel that he genuinely respects Cecilia as a lady saint. When Lawrence removes a spider from Cecilia's bedroom, he believes that she needs him just as much as the other way around.
3	"Lawrence's Concerns"; Transliteration: "Rōrensu no Kigakari" (Japanese: ローレンスの気がかり)	Ryouki Kamitsubo	Michihiro Tsuchiya	Ryouki Kamitsubo	July 27, 2023
After Abel catches a cold from being out in the rain, Cecilia stay behind to look after him while Lawrence conducts a church service. When he returns home, he feels uneasy, though he is uncertain of the reason. The next day, Lawrence bakes scones, cookies and madeleines for Cecilia to enjoy as a way to alleviate his guilty conscience. Abel gives Lawrence a letter from a former classmate at the seminary, which brings up concern as to how Cecilia would be introduced outside town. Cecilia reassures Lawrence that she is content with her current living arrangement, making Lawrence no longer uneasy. Upon finding a red scarf left behind at the church, Lawrence and Cecilia convince Abel to join them for a walk to the town square in order to return the red scarf to its owner. They chance upon a fortune teller named Mel, who uses a crystal ball to give their readings. When Cecilia's cape tears from getting caught in a nail, Cecilia visits Rebecca to choose a different outfit. After Rebecca reveals that Lawrence has been feeling lonely until Cecilia came into his life, Cecilia briefly meets Rebecca's son Erik. As Cecilia admires the view of the town from a balcony, a girl named Hazelita saves Cecilia from tripping down the stairs. Lawrence and Abel walk back to the town square after returning the red scarf its owner. Cecilia is overjoyed when Lawrence compliments her new outfit.
4	"She Who Is Called the Lady Saint"; Transliteration: "Seijo to Yobareru Mono" (Japanese: 聖女と呼ばれるもの)	Hiroshi Haraguchi	Yuka Yamada	Hiroshi Haraguchi	August 3, 2023
Hazelita pays a visit to the church in order to find Abel, revealed to be Hazelita's tutor. Moreover, Hazelita is surprised that Cecilia is the holy lady saint residing with Lawrence. Cecilia is impressed that Hazelita knows how to make a flower crown. At the house, Abel persuades Lawrence to allow Hazelita to stay overnight. Stemming from a past sad memory about another holy lady saint, later recognized as Frederica, Hazelita interrogates Lawrence about his angle for Cecilia living with him. Abel reveals to Cecilia that any holy lady saint including Frederica is susceptible to dying from disease just like any mortal. Hazelita notices how much Cecilia appreciates Lawrence's hospitality during dinnertime. Abel and Hazelita find it amusing that Lawrence has never addressed Cecilia by her name. The next day, Hazelita tells Abel that there is nothing suspicious going on between Cecilia and Lawrence. When Lawrence recalls that he made a box of silly-faced ornaments during his youth, Cecilia tries her best to say how adorable they are, though Abel and Hazelita can see through how dense Lawrence and Cecilia are acting.
5	"First Official Trip"; Transliteration: "Hajimete no Shutchō" (Japanese: はじめての出張)	Geisei Morita & Sumie Noro	Michihiro Tsuchiya	Ryōta Itō	August 10, 2023
Abel and Hazelita accompany Cecilia and Lawrence on a trip to visit an elderly woman named Corinne. After telling Cecilia about Lawrence during his childhood when Oswell was alive up until a few years ago, Corinne later informs Lawrence that she hears whispering voices coming from the lake after sundown. There is a rising suspicion of fairies living in the lake when Abel noticed a sudden splash while Hazelita was unable to take photos there. In the evening by the lake, Lawrence worries that he will be able to follow in Oswell's footsteps as a pastor, though Cecilia recognizes Lawrence for being a great cook. Cecilia further explains that Lawrence will never feel alone as long as she is around. After learning from Lawrence about fairies living in the lake, Cecilia communicates with the fairies while Lawrence witnesses Cecilia seemingly talking to the air and water. The next day, Corinne is well-rested and bids farewell to Cecilia, Lawrence, Abel and Hazelita. On Valentine's Day, Abel and Hazelita tell Cecilia that giving baked chocolates is a tradition. Cecilia asks Lawrence to teach her how to make baked chocolate, though he is unaware that it would be for him. Lawrence leaves the house to fetch some more ingredients in the town square, where he briefly runs into Mel. When Lawrence returns to the house, he bandages Cecilia's cut finger. He soon discovers that Cecilia baked a chocolate for him, much to Hazelita's frustration.
6	"Abel and Hazelita"; Transliteration: "Aberu to Hēzeritta" (Japanese: アベルとヘーゼリッタ)	Kōki Uchinomiya	Yuka Yamada	Kōki Uchinomiya	August 17, 2023
As Cecilia volunteers as a waitress for restaurant owner Kelly since the restaurant is short-staffed, Lawrence initially decides to sit at a table with Mel to keep a close eye, though Kelly coerces Lawrence to volunteer as a waiter. Lawrence stops Cecilia from slipping, while preventing a tray of food and drinks from dropping. Afterwards, Cecilia tells Lawrence that she enjoyed volunteering as a waitress since she gets to see people in their everyday lives. In the evening, Lawrence and Abel search for a missing boy, while Hazelita looks after Cecilia at the house in the meantime. Opting to stay up late, Hazelita describes Lawrence and Cecilia having a parent-child relationship instead of a romantic relationship, despite the fact that Cecilia is happy with her life right now. Cecilia originally believed that Hazelita had a crush on Abel, but Hazelita denies this fact. When they return to the house, Lawrence and Abel are greeted by Cecilia and Hazelita. The next day, Cecilia and Hazelita go through photos of Lawrence and Abel when they attended the seminary. Lawrence recalls that Abel used to have a stoic demeanor compared to his current eccentric personality. This is because Abel was treated as an outcast for having the gift of sensing supernatural entities. It is revealed that Abel gave Lawrence a cross necklace, which stopped Lawrence's chronic headaches. Abel reflects that Lawrence influenced him to come out of his shell, which helped Abel to become a good tutor for Hazelita.
7	"Cecilia's Worries"; Transliteration: "Seshiria no Nayamigoto" (Japanese: セシリアのなやみごと)	Ryouki Kamitsubo	Michihiro Tsuchiya	Ryouki Kamitsubo	August 24, 2023
Cecilia, Abel and Hazelita covertly follow Lawrence to the town square, where Mel briefly joins in on the fun. However, Cecilia gets separated from Abel and Hazelita, who are then spotted by Lawrence. Cecilia chances upon Erik, who informs her that Lawrence is at Rebecca's clothing shop. Abel, Hazelita and Mel discover that Lawrence is Erik's tutor. Cecilia and Erik head towards the Rebecca's clothing shop. Abel and Hazelita stay behind, while Lawrence and Mel look for Cecilia. As Cecilia expresses her worries that Lawrence might be keeping secrets from her, Erik reassures her that Lawrence is a sincere person. As Lawrence reunites with Cecilia and Erik at Rebecca's clothing shop, Lawrence gives Erik a textbook to read, while Cecilia apologizes to Lawrence for following him without permission. Later on, Lawrence and Abel receive a invitation to a special conference for pastors. Cecilia, Hazelita and Erik accompany Lawrence and Abel to the city. Lawrence and Abel attend the special conference, where they greet their former classmates Hein, Camilla and Eurie. The senior pastor named Hugo privately talks with Lawrence to confirm rumors of a holy lady saint residing at Lawrence's church, promising to keep this a secret. After meeting up with Abel, Lawrence introduces Cecilia, Hazelita and Erik to his former classmates. However, Camilla and Eurie assume that Cecilia is Lawrence's girlfriend. Soon after, Lawrence and Cecilia come across Giselbert, Hazelita's older brother.
8	"Frederica's Bequest"; Transliteration: "Furederika no Nokoshita Mono" (Japanese: フレデリカの遺したもの)	Hiroshi Haraguchi & Sung Min Kim	Yuka Yamada	Hiroshi Haraguchi	August 31, 2023
Cecilia is caught off guard when Lawrence finally addresses her by name. Giselbert invites Cecilia and Lawrence to the Aldridge family mansion, where Hazelita formally introduces Giselbert to Cecilia, Lawrence, Abel and Erik. While sharing a drink of Scotch whisky, Giselbert brags to Lawrence about how he hired Abel as Hazelita's tutor. The next day, Cecilia and Lawrence go sightseeing around the city. Lawrence buys Cecilia a necklace with a gem modeled after a poppy. Cecilia and Lawrence meet up with Abel, Hazelita and Erik at a diner, where Cecilia and Erik eat a cheeseburger for the first time. Lawrence incurs a chronic headache, having previously passed by a garden. After Cecilia eases the pain, Abel explains that the garden is the resting place of Frederica. Hazelita recalls that Frederica was kept in custody by a wealthy family. In fact, Hazelita learned how to make flower crowns during childhood when she used to visit Frederica at the garden. However, the wealthy family only worshiped Frederica for her holiness and refused to treat her like a mortal, which resulted in her death. At night, Cecilia and Lawrence follow Giselbert to the garden, where Giselbert places a bouquet on Frederica's gravestone. Giselbert reveals that he failed in trying to take Frederica away from the wealthy family. Cecilia sheds teardrops after realizing that Frederica gave Hazelita and Giselbert divine protection before dying.
9	"Lady Saint's Divine Protection"; Transliteration: "Seijo no Kago" (Japanese: 聖女の加護)	Hiroyuki Hashimoto	Michihiro Tsuchiya	Hiroyuki Hashimoto	September 7, 2023
Inside the study, Giselbert has a discussion with Cecilia and Lawrence about divine protection. The Great Lady Saint residing at Michela Island may grant the prayers of divine protection by the other holy lady saints. Despite learning that Cecilia has giving him divine protection, Lawrence reassures her that he sees her as an ordinary person. Giselbert reveals that he is an ambassador on behalf of the Great Lady Saint, investigating whether the other holy lady saints live peacefully. Lawrence, Cecilia, Abel, Hazelita and Erik dress in formal attire and attend an outdoor banquet, while Hein, Camilla and Eurie are invited there as well. Although Camilla finds out that Cecilia is living with Lawrence, Hazelita plays it down by saying that Cecilia appreciates Lawrence's cooking. Cecilia likes Lawrence for always being there for her, though Camilla worries that Cecilia might be way over her head since Lawrence is incredibly dense. Hazelita announces that she will not be returning to the village, much to Cecilia's surprise. After Hazelita and Lawrence respectively talk to Abel and Giselbert, Lawrence requests Hazelita to return to the village so Cecilia will not be lonely, though Hazelita must complete her studies first. On the train ride back, Cecilia feels like she has become closer to Lawrence.
10	"Their Feelings"; Transliteration: "Futari no Kimochi" (Japanese: ふたりの気持ち)	Takashi Takeuchi	Michihiro Tsuchiya	Hiroaki Yoshikawa	September 14, 2023
Cecilia and Lawrence adjust to not having Abel and Hazelita around at the house. When Lawrence is busy cleaning the church all day, Cecilia is left feeling lonely. At night, Lawrence gives Cecilia a warm mug of milk to help her fall asleep, though she wants to spend more quality time with him. Cecilia goes to bed flustered after she accidentally pulls down Lawrence over her on the sofa. In the morning, Cecilia avoids making eye contact with Lawrence, even when he bakes scones and madeleines for her. They both act strangely at the church as well. When Cecilia bumps into Mel, the latter advises the former to help Lawrence connect the dots for a romantic relationship. Later before dinnertime, Cecilia admits that she felt unsettled since last night, but she fails to confess her feelings for him. The next morning, Cecilia is greeted by Abel and Hazelita, who have come to collect their personal belongings before they move into an apartment in the town square. Cecilia and Lawrence help transport luggage to the apartment for Abel and Hazelita. While returning to the house, Lawrence tells Cecilia that Hazelita felt beholden to do all the housework for Lawrence when she lodged at the house. Rather than going to a restaurant, Abel and Hazelita opt to have dinner with Cecilia and Lawrence at the house.
11	"The Way They Met"; Transliteration: "Futari no Deai" (Japanese: ふたりの出会い)	Sumie Noro	Michihiro Tsuchiya	Sumie Noro	September 21, 2023
As winter approaches, Lawrence wakes up Cecilia in the morning. Worried that Cecilia and Lawrence will not become closer, Hazelita convinces Abel to have a talk with Lawrence. After learning that Lawrence is trying hard to address Cecilia by her name, Abel tells Hazelita that he will continue monitoring Lawrence and Cecilia. Lawrence recalls when he first met Cecilia one year ago. In the past, Cecilia forecast a heavy rainstorm that would destroy the village if the bridge was not destroyed. Believing her words, Lawrence invited the townspeople inside the church overnight, and the village was safe the following day. Cecilia was welcomed to stay with Lawrence, who baked scones for her to enjoy. Back in the present, Abel and Hazelita have dinner with Cecilia and Lawrence at the house. After Abel and Hazelita leave the house, Lawrence brings Cecilia to the attic, where they stargaze at the winter sky. Cecilia shares her past with Lawrence. In the past, Cecilia became a holy lady saint at a young age and lived with her grandmother. After her grandmother passed away, she had a vivid dream of the village being flooded by the heavy rainstorm. Cecilia went to the village, warning the townspeople to destroy the bridge, though it was Lawrence who managed to convince the townspeople. Back in the present, Cecilia and Lawrence reflect that they found happiness with living together.
12	"The Shape of Their Relationship"; Transliteration: "Futari no Katachi" (Japanese: ふたりのかたち)	Sumie Noro, Kōki Uchinomiya & Hiroshi Haraguchi	Yuka Yamada	Masako Satō	September 28, 2023
Cecilia and Lawrence visit Rebecca and Erik at the clothing shop. During a tutoring session, Erik explains that Lawrence sees Cecilia as a family member rather than a roommate. Mel tells Lawrence that he must decide how he sees Cecilia. Rebecca informs Cecilia and Lawrence that she is participating in the upcoming annual festival called the Winter Market. On their way back to the house, Cecilia describes the meaning of family to Lawrence. Soon after, Lawrence concludes that he sees Cecilia as a family member, though Abel and Hazelita only sees this as a roundabout perspective. On the day of the Winter Market, Abel and Hazelita accompany Cecilia and Lawrence to the festivities. Cecilia and Lawrence visit Rebecca, Erik and Mel at their booths. Mel privately tells Erik that Cecilia and Lawrence must realize their unspoken love for each other. As it begins to snow in the evening, Lawrence takes previous advice from Hazelita and anxiously embraces Cecilia. As Lawrence recalls that he found happiness after Oswell passed away when Cecilia became a part of his life, Cecilia says that she would never leave his side since they are family. The following morning, Lawrence is caught off guard when Cecilia accidentally bumps her head while sleepwalking. Abel and Hazelita then visit Cecilia and Lawrence for breakfast. The last scene shows Lily bringing flowers to the church, noticing that Cecilia secretly loves Lawrence.

== Reception ==
Reviewing the manga's first volume, Rebecca Silverman from Anime News Network praised its art, but had mixed feelings with the storyline, calling it "funny and sweet at times," while criticizing the lack of tension.

== See also ==
- The Angel Next Door Spoils Me Rotten, light novel series whose first volume was illustrated by Hazano Kazutake
