= In the Heart of Kunoichi Tsubaki =

Japanese manga series and its adaptation(s)

- First tankōbon volume cover, featuring (from left to right) Asagao, Tsubaki, and Sazanka

くノ一ツバキの胸の内 (Kunoichi Tsubaki no Mune no Uchi)
- Genre: Comedy
- Manga
- Written by: Sōichirō Yamamoto
- Published by: Shogakukan
- Imprint: Monthly Shōnen Sunday Comics
- Magazine: Monthly Shōnen Sunday
- Original run: January 12, 2018 – May 12, 2023
- Volumes: 9
- Anime television series
- Directed by: Takudai Kakuchi
- Written by: Konomi Shugo
- Music by: Yūsuke Shirato
- Studio: CloverWorks
- Licensed by: Crunchyroll: SA/SEA: Medialink
- Original network: Tokyo MX, GYT, GTV, BS11, MBS, CTV
- Original run: April 10, 2022 – July 3, 2022
- Episodes: 13
- icon

In the Heart of Kunoichi Tsubaki (Japanese: くノ一ツバキの胸の内, Hepburn: Kunoichi Tsubaki no Mune no Uchi) is a Japanese manga series written and illustrated by Sōichirō Yamamoto. It was serialized in Shogakukan's shōnen manga magazine Monthly Shōnen Sunday from January 2018 to May 2023, with its chapters collected in nine tankōbon volumes. An anime television series adaptation produced by CloverWorks aired from April to July 2022.

== Plot ==
Tsubaki, a kunoichi and the best student of the Akane Class, lives in a village where women are not allowed to have contact with men. However, she has a curiosity about them that she wants to keep hidden.

== Characters ==
=== Akane Class ===
==== Team Dog ====
Tsubaki (ツバキ)
Voiced by: Yūko Natsuyoshi
Sazanka (サザンカ)
Voiced by: Miyari Nemoto
Asagao (アサガオ)
Voiced by: Sayumi Suzushiro
Rindou (リンドウ, Rindō)
Voiced by: Konomi Kohara
A newcomer to the village. She initially presented herself as a boy. She is usually seen wearing a mask.

==== Team Sheep ====
Benisumomo (ベニスモモ)
Voiced by: Aya Yamane
Mizubashou (ミズバショウ, Mizubashō)
Voiced by: Manaka Iwami
Touwata (トウワタ, Tōwata)
Voiced by: Miyu Tomita

==== Team Horse ====
Hinagiku (ヒナギク)
Voiced by: Marika Kōno
A haughty girl who loves to use her cuteness to take advantage of others. She cries when others surpass her cuteness.
Kibushi (キブシ)
Voiced by: Maria Naganawa
Oniyuri (オニユリ)
Voiced by: Yō Taichi

==== Team Monkey ====
Mokuren (モクレン)
Voiced by: Hina Yōmiya
Housenka (ホウセンカ, Hōsenka)
Voiced by: Hiyori Kono
Tsuwabuki (ツワブキ)
Voiced by: Yuuki Hirose

==== Team Rat ====
Tachiaoi (タチアオイ)
Voiced by: Kana Ichinose
Higuruma (ヒグルマ)
Voiced by: Mayu Mineda
Hagi (ハギ)
Voiced by: Reina Kondō

==== Team Ox ====
Shion (シオン)
Voiced by: Ikumi Hasegawa
Suzuran (スズラン)
Voiced by: Hikaru Tono
Ajisai (アジサイ)
Voiced by: Aoi Koga

==== Team Tiger ====
Fuki (フキ)
Voiced by: Mayu Minami
Itadori (イタドリ)
Voiced by: Ayaka Nanase
Ume (ウメ)
Voiced by: Misaki Watada

==== Team Snake ====
Kikyou (キキョウ, Kikyō)
Voiced by: Minami Tanaka
Uikyou (ウイキョウ, Uikyō)
Voiced by: Madoka Asahina

==== Team Dragon ====
Hasu (ハス)
Voiced by: Moe Kahara
Suzushiro (スズシロ)
Voiced by: Yūki Takada
Higiri (ヒギリ)
Voiced by: Yuka Nukui

==== Team Rabbit ====
Kagetsu (カゲツ)
Voiced by: Saya Aizawa
Mukuge (ムクゲ)
Voiced by: Ayasa Itō
Hototogisu (ホトトギス)
Voiced by: Eri Yukimura

==== Team Rooster ====
Sumire (スミレ)
Voiced by: Fairouz Ai
Azami (アザミ)
Voiced by: Ayaka Asai
Tanpopo (タンポポ)
Voiced by: Honoka Inoue

==== Team Boar ====
Dokudami (ドクダミ)
Voiced by: Natsumi Kawaida
Aogiri (アオギリ)
Voiced by: Makoto Koichi
Shakuyaku (シャクヤク)
Voiced by: Rio Tsuchiya

==== Teachers ====
Hana (ハナ)
Voiced by: Yumi Uchiyama
Konoha (コノハ)
Voiced by: M.A.O

== Media ==
=== Manga ===
Written and illustrated by Sōichirō Yamamoto, In the Heart of Kunoichi Tsubaki was serialized in Shogakukan's shōnen manga magazine Monthly Shōnen Sunday from January 12, 2018, to May 12, 2023. Shogakukan collected its chapters in nine tankōbon volumes, released from July 12, 2018, to August 9, 2023.

==== Volumes ====
No.	Japanese release date	Japanese ISBN
1	July 12, 2018	978-4-09-128439-6
2	February 12, 2019	978-4-09-128877-6
3	July 4, 2019	978-4-09-129288-9
4	January 10, 2020	978-4-09-129571-2
5	August 12, 2020	978-4-09-850213-4
6	November 12, 2021	978-4-09-850800-6
7	April 12, 2022	978-4-09-851064-1
8	March 10, 2023	978-4-09-851764-0
9	August 9, 2023	978-4-09-852774-8

=== Anime ===
On November 9, 2021, Aniplex announced an anime television series adaptation produced by CloverWorks. The series was directed by Takuhiro Kodachi, with the scripts handled by Konomi Shugo, character designs by Yousuke Okuda, and music composition by Yūsuke Shirato. It aired from April 10 to July 3, 2022, on Tokyo MX and other networks. (Note: Tokyo MX listed the series premiere at 24:00 JST on April 9, 2022, which is effectively April 10 at midnight.) The opening theme song is "Highlight - Highlight" (ハイライト・ハイライト, Hairaito Hairaito) by the Peggies. For each episode, different cast members performed a version of the ending theme song "Akane-gumi Katsudou Nisshi" (あかね組活動日誌) as their respective teams. Crunchyroll streamed the series. Medialink has licensed the series in Asia-Pacific.

==== Episodes ====
No.	Title (Note: All English titles are taken from Crunchyroll.)	Directed by	Written by	Storyboarded by	Original release date
1	"Men Are Dangerous"; Transliteration: "Kiken na Otoko" (Japanese: 危険な男)	Chie Yamashiro	Konomi Shugo	Takudai Kakuchi	April 10, 2022
Sazanka and Asagao of Team Dog go AWOL from their village, so their leader Tsubaki is assigned to bring them back. She catches them and Sazanka says she wanted to find and fight a man to impress her. Having never seen a man before, Tsubaki becomes curious and decides to see one. They catch a glimpse of a man before she panics and runs away. The next day, Tsubaki gets distracted during classes and combat training due to everyone gossiping about men. Sensing weakness, Housenka of Team Monkey challenges her to a fight, but is rebuffed. To help her with her issues, Sazanka challenges her to use a fire Jutsu on a puddle while she says the word "Man". When they do it, she panics and makes a huge fireball that makes a crater, scaring Housenka away. Later, Asagao tries to use a transformation Jutsu to show the other students what a man looks like, but botches it and turns into a fish.
2	"Effort and Giftedness"; Transliteration: "Doryoku to Tensai" (Japanese: 努力と天才)	Masahiro Shinohara, Takudai Kakuchi	Konomi Shugo	Hikaru Satō	April 17, 2022
2	"Escape Plan with Nee-sama"; Transliteration: "Nē-sama to Dasshutsu Keikaku" (Japanese: 姉さまと脱出計画)	Masahiro Shinohara, Takudai Kakuchi	Konomi Shugo	Hikaru Satō	April 17, 2022
Team Dog is pitted against Benisumomo, Mizubashou, and Touwata of Team Sheep in combat training. Touwata asks Tsubaki to beat Benisumomo to teach her a lesson about her laziness. As the combat begins, Sazanka and Asagao capture Touwata but are captured by Mizubashou. Tsubaki, who knows Benisumomo trains in secret to maintain her reputation as a prodigy, duels her to a draw. Touwata promises that one day, she will become stronger than Benisumomo and prove that hard work is superior to natural talent. Tsubaki has been ignoring Sazanka due to constantly thinking about men. Displeased by this and the fact that Tsubaki has different classes from her and Asagao, Sazanka ditches class to visit Tsubaki, picking a flower along the way. The class finds out and orders Asagao to retrieve her. Asagao catches her, but Sazanka bribes her with her portion of meat at dinner to let her go. Tsubaki catches her and Sazanka lies that she just wanted to take a walk. Later, they put the flower in a vase and Sazanka keeps her word and gives Asagao her meat. Sazanka is happy when Tsubaki shares her meat with her.
3	"Friendly Showdown"; Transliteration: "Nakayoshi Taiketsu" (Japanese: 仲良し対決)	Nanase Tomii	Konomi Shugo	Nanase Tomii	April 24, 2022
3	"Tag (The Man Is It)"; Transliteration: "Otoko Onigokko" (Japanese: 男鬼ごっこ)	Nanase Tomii	Konomi Shugo	Nanase Tomii	April 24, 2022
Team Dog is assigned to collect food, but Sazanka and Asagao constantly bicker. The twins Kikyou and Uikyou of Team Snake challenge Team Dog to steal a scroll from them. To make them work together, Tsubaki ties Sazanka and Asagao together and refuses to help. Once they finally catch up with the twins, the latter uses a sleep Jutsu on them. Sazanka and Asagao counter this by pinching each other and trap the twins before falling asleep. Afterwards, Tsubaki realizes the scroll was blank, but is happy that the two worked together. When the class gossips about men, their teacher, Hana, orders them to play tag. Playing the role of "it" as a man, she tells them if they can grab her hair tie before sunset, everyone will get supper. However, she easily catches them one by one. Benisumomo tries to fight her and is defeated, but Hana begins to suffer back pain. Later, while Tsubaki is disguised as the other teacher, Konoha, Hana says they regretfully must perpetuate the lie that men are dangerous. Shocked, Tsubaki drops her disguise and runs away. When the real Konoha arrives, Hana tells her she must catch Tsubaki.
4	"Men and Women"; Transliteration: "Otoko to Onna" (Japanese: 男と女)	Chie Yamashiro	Konomi Shugo	Chie Yamashiro	May 1, 2022
4	"Mokuren's Medical Jutsu"; Transliteration: "Mokuren no Iryō Jutsu" (Japanese: モクレンの医療術)	Chie Yamashiro	Konomi Shugo	Chie Yamashiro	May 1, 2022
Konoha captures Tsubaki with a dancing leaves and sleep Jutsu. When she wakes up, Hana and Konoha explain that their village used to be integrated, but the men and women kept falling in love, eloping, and leaving the village. To stop this, their leaders separated and told the lie about the opposite gender being dangerous. Tsubaki agrees to keep the secret in exchange for the students getting supper. After hearing Hana describe what love is, a confused Tsubaki realizes she is feeling it. Mokuren of Team Monkey goes for a walk to enjoy her day off, but various students keep asking her for favors or to use her healing Jutsu on them. She is unable to refuse and is exhausted. Tsubaki urges Mokuren to stand up for herself, but she says it is her duty to help others. Tsubaki, whom the secret has been weighing heavily on her mind, is encouraged to do her duty as well. Mokuren then takes a nap. She is embarrassed when her teammates find and wake her up in the middle of the night. Later, Tsubaki is flustered thinking about men, but Mokuren thinks she is sick and tries to heal her.
5	"A Fight over Some Fruit"; Transliteration: "Kudamono o Meguru Tatakai" (Japanese: 果物を巡るたたかい)	Kazuya Aiura	Konomi Shugo	Shinji Itadaki, Akira Nishimori, Takudai Kakuchi	May 8, 2022
5	"Independence and Indulgence"; Transliteration: "Ichininmae to Amayakashi" (Japanese: 一人前と甘やかし)	Kazuya Aiura	Konomi Shugo	Shinji Itadaki, Akira Nishimori, Takudai Kakuchi	May 8, 2022
Asagao leads Team Dog to her secret grove of fruit trees, but finds Hinagiku, Kibushi, and Oniyuri of Team Horse eating the fruit even though she wrote her name on them. After an argument, they decide to settle the matter with a cuteness contest between Tsubaki and Hinagiku. Team Horse cheats by hypnotizing Asagao and Sazanka into voting for Hinagiku. Tsubaki counters by duplicating herself, but is so nervous that her duplicates fade before they can vote. However, Tsubaki's nervous face is so cute that Hinagiku forfeits and gives up the fruit. Ajisai of Team Ox is annoyed that her teammates Shion and Suzuran constantly treat her like a baby. Determined to prove she is strong, she challenges Tsubaki to a fight, but Sazanka accepts in her place. Ajisai takes a beating, but lasts until the time limit expires. Shion and Suzuran reveal they were watching and admit she is strong. However, they continue to baby her and say they do it because she is so cute. Later, Team Ox does Ajisai's hair into buns and Tsubaki does Sazanka's hair into pigtails. Hinagiku laments that they are cuter than her.
6	"The Transfer Student"; Transliteration: "Ten'nyūsei" (Japanese: 転入生)	Kōhei Kuratomi	Konomi Shugo	Masahiro Shinohara	May 15, 2022
6	"Shy Around Strangers"; Transliteration: "Hitomishiri" (Japanese: 人見知り)	Kōhei Kuratomi	Konomi Shugo	Masahiro Shinohara	May 15, 2022
The class gets a new transfer student. The student, who wears a mask due to her shyness, is rescued by Tsubaki after she referred to herself using a male pronoun. She introduces herself as Rindou and confides that she was raised as a boy. After briefly seeing her without her mask, Tsubaki asks Rindou to remove it to prove she is a girl, but she refuses and instead drops her pants to prove she does not have a "ding-a-ling". Once the other students are convinced about the situation, Tsubaki becomes embarrassed. Tsubaki introduces Rindou to Team Dog, but Sazanka is displeased. After dinner, they go to a hot spring, but Rindou still will not remove her mask. As Rindou begs Sazanka to be her friend, Sazanka faints from being in the hot water too long. Rindou uses a summon Jutsu to bring Mokuren to them so she can heal her. Sazanka thanks Rindou, but pulls off her mask, exposing her cute face. After she puts it back on and Tsubaki scolds Sazanka, Mokuren joins them in the hot spring. The next day, Konoha reviews various Jutsu with the class before revealing she is Tsubaki in disguise.
7	"Rindou's Resolve"; Transliteration: "Rindō no Ketsui" (Japanese: リンドウの決意)	Tomonori Mine	Konomi Shugo	Tadahito Matsubayashi	May 22, 2022
7	"Late-Night Summons"; Transliteration: "Yonaka no Yobidashi" (Japanese: 夜中の呼び出し)	Tomonori Mine	Konomi Shugo	Tadahito Matsubayashi	May 22, 2022
Rindou tries to practice removing her mask in public, but is too shy. Sazanka tries to remove it and is scolded by Tsubaki. As Sazanka complains that she just wanted to see her cute face, Team Horse overhears and Hinagiku wants to see for herself, so she asks Sazanka and Asagao for help. They lure Rindou into a trap, but Sazanka and Asagao turn on Team Horse and Rindou was really Tsubaki in disguise. Rindou decides to remove her mask permanently, dazzling Hinagiku. Tsubaki asks Rindou about men, but Hana interrupts and orders them to come to her house that night. They sneak out to go there, but Sazanka follows them and attacks, jealously accusing them of eloping. Tsubaki knocks her out with a sleep dart and they arrive at Hana's house. After asking Rindou how she is adjusting to the village, Hana asks Tsubaki to look after her team and warns them not to talk about men in public. The next day, Asagao finds her emergency food stash was eaten and accuses the others, which they deny. Tsubaki later finds out Asagao eats the food in her sleep.
8	"The Strongest Team"; Transliteration: "Saikyō no Han" (Japanese: 最強の班)	Nanase Tomii	Konomi Shugo	Nanase Tomii	May 29, 2022
8	"Nee-sama"; Transliteration: "Nē-sama" (Japanese: 姉さま)	Nanase Tomii	Konomi Shugo	Nanase Tomii	May 29, 2022
Dokudami, Aogiri, and Shakuyaku of Team Boar return from a long journey and share boar meat with the others. Team Dog explains to Rindou that Team Boar are the village's strongest warriors. Asagao tries to compliment them by calling them "stupid strong", but they think she was calling them stupid and attack her. Tsubaki challenges Dokudami to a duel and she accepts after greeting the teachers. Team Dog relaxes and explains Team Boar always gets lost. Mokuren confirms Team Boar cannot find the battlefield and walked into a swamp. Rindou asks Tsubaki why Sazanka always calls her "Nee-sama" (big sister). She tells a tale of when they were younger. The students were assigned to form teams and race to a mountaintop, but Sazanka was a loner and always pulled pranks on others. Tsubaki reached out to her and she said nobody likes her. Tsubaki said she liked her and carried Sazanka when she injured her ankle, then Asagao carried them both when Tsubaki injured her own ankle, leading to the formation of their team and Sazanka's devotion to her. Team Boar reached the mountaintop last due to their lack of direction.
9	"Of Snakes and Men"; Transliteration: "Hebi to Otoko" (Japanese: ヘビと男)	Takudai Kakuchi	Konomi Shugo	Takudai Kakuchi	June 5, 2022
9	"What Defines Results"; Transliteration: "Seika to wa" (Japanese: 成果とは)	Takudai Kakuchi	Konomi Shugo	Takudai Kakuchi	June 5, 2022
Hana promises to treat anyone who can catch her pet snakes to dinner. Tsubaki catches one, but lets Team Tiger have it. As they search for more, Tsubaki is irritated when Sazanka and Asagao jokingly call the snakes men and lectures them. While Tsubaki helps repair Rindou's mask strap, Rindou teaches her the differences between men and women, but when she mentions the "ding-a-ling" resembles a snake, Tsubaki is so shocked that she lets a snake go past her and Ajisai catches it. Rindou asks about Team Rooster and Tsubaki says they are training in the mountains. Just then, Sumire, Azami, and Tanpopo of Team Rooster arrive. The latter two are unrecognizable since Sumire trained them to drop their delinquent habits. Sumire leaves to greet the teachers and the two immediately revert to their old ways, bragging that they only pretended to behave so Sumire would let them go home. Tsubaki realizes Sumire is still there, invisible. She is angry at first, but touched when they say they love her. She reveals herself and drags them back to the mountains for more training. That night, the two complain, but decide it is not so bad.
10	"A Team Leader's Troubles"; Transliteration: "Hanchō no Nayami" (Japanese: 班長の悩み)	Ayako Kurata	Konomi Shugo	Ayako Kurata	June 12, 2022
10	"Favors and Debts"; Transliteration: "Kashi to Kari" (Japanese: 貸しと借り)	Ayako Kurata	Konomi Shugo	Ayako Kurata	June 12, 2022
Tachiaoi of Team Rat doubts herself because she can never say "No" to her teammates Higuruma and Hagi. As Higuruma drags them on a boar hunt, Tachiaoi witnesses Tsubaki disciplining her team. Inspired, she tells Higuruma and Hagi to practice throwing shuriken, but they did not bring any, so they practice fire Jutsu. It rains and they take shelter in a cave. Tachiaoi laments her inadequacies as a leader, but her teammates reassure her. When the rain stops, they bathe in a hot spring and Tachiaoi vows to find her own path. Rindou summons Mokuren because Tsubaki is sick, but her healing Jutsu doesn't work on illnesses. She says she can make a cure from some herbs in a mountain cave. Benisumomo overhears and decides to get them so Tsubaki will owe her a favor. She leaves with Sazanka and Asagao in hot pursuit. The cave is blocked, so they dig a hole big enough for Sazanka to enter. Benisumomo tricks them and steals the bag of herbs, but when they arrive home, Sazanka reveals she tricked her with a fake bag. Tsubaki thanks Benisumomo anyway. Later, Benisumomo finds out Mokuren's teammates ditched her and helps her gather herbs.
11	"Attractiveness Jutsu"; Transliteration: "Mote Jutsu" (Japanese: もて術)	Sumito Sasaki, Ryō Kodama	Konomi Shugo	Michio Fukuda	June 19, 2022
11	"I Want to Be Attractive"; Transliteration: "Motetai" (Japanese: モテたい)	Sumito Sasaki, Ryō Kodama	Konomi Shugo	Michio Fukuda	June 19, 2022
During a concert put on by Team Rabbit, Rindou says they are attractive. After explaining to Team Dog what that word means, they interpret it as tricking a man into dropping his guard and ask her to teach them an attractiveness Jutsu. She teaches them to make sexy poses. Sazanka and Asagao quickly master it, but Tsubaki's attempt just makes them laugh and say she looks ridiculous, making her cry. The next day, Sazanka and Asagao taught a few girls the attractiveness Jutsu. Tsubaki says their moves are too weak to defeat a man and attempts the Jutsu again, but they all laugh at her and she runs away in shame. Hana finds out, disguises herself as Tsubaki, and acts so sexy that everyone blushes and concedes to her. Hana lectures her not to let this happen again, but she acts so sexy that Tsubaki is left dazed. Later, Housenka teaches the rest of Team Monkey the Jutsu. Tsuwabuki cannot do it and irately chases Housenka. Once they leave, Mokuren is embarrassed when Tsubaki catches her practicing it.
12	"Rivals"; Transliteration: "Raibaru" (Japanese: ライバル)	Imamura	Konomi Shugo	Imamura	June 26, 2022
12	"Picture of a Man"; Transliteration: "Otoko no E" (Japanese: 男の絵)	Imamura	Konomi Shugo	Imamura	June 26, 2022
Ajisai and Ume keep making Hinagiku cry by taunting her with the attractiveness Jutsu. While Oniyuri chases them, Kibushi asks Benisumomo to cheer Hinagiku up. Instead, Benisumomo repeatedly taunts her. Benisumomo realizes she took her joke too far, but Hinagiku cheers up, thinking Benisumomo sees her as a rival. When Oniyuri arrives with Ajisai and Ume, they see Benisumomo taunting Hinagiku again. Konoha makes Sazanka and Asagao clean out a shed for unruly behavior. While going over to help them, Tsubaki asks Rindou to draw a man, but is disappointed by her poor art skills. When Hana learns what Konoha did, she heads there. Team Dog finds a scroll labeled "Man" and wants to open it, but Tsubaki sternly decides to give it to Hana. However, Hana's arrival inadvertently makes Tsubaki drop and open the scroll before Hana picks it up. A flashback reveals as a teen, Hana drew a man she fancied, but got embarrassed and smudged it. Tsubaki is disturbed that it resembles Rindou's drawing. Later, Konoha and Hana leave Tsubaki in charge of the village while they visit a doctor for Hana's back pain. Elsewhere, a man is near the village.
13	"Showdown! Akane Class vs. the Man!?"; Transliteration: "Kessen! Akane-gumi tai Otoko!?" (Japanese: 決戦！あかね組vs男!?)	Chie Yamashiro, Kōhei Kuratomi, Takudai Kakuchi	Konomi Shugo	Yoshihide Ibata	July 3, 2022
Tsubaki worries that men actually look like Rindou and Hana's drawings. She later cannot make the class obey her. That night, a hut gets smashed and Tsubaki sees a fleeing figure resembling the drawings. The next day, the class see several craters and a huge footprint and conclude a man attacked. Benisumomo wants to hunt him down, but Tsubaki tells the class to fortify the village. A beast man then attacks and easily overpowers the girls. After a tough fight, Tsubaki and Benisumomo defeat it, discovering it is just a monkey with an octopus on its head. The teachers return and the class has an eating contest which Asagao wins, earning a ribbon for Sazanka. Hana congratulates Tsubaki for defending the village and reminds her that not all men are evil and one day, she might meet and fall in love with one. When Tsubaki leaves, a man, revealed to have been the monkey in disguise, meets Hana and discusses how she hired him to test the students. Hana says Tsubaki may succeed her. When Tsubaki learns all of Rindou's drawings look the same, she cheers up and looks forward to meeting a man for real.

== Reception ==
=== Manga ===
In 2020, the manga was one of the 50 nominees for the sixth Next Manga Awards.

=== Anime ===
The anime adaptation was one of the 100 nominees for the Anime Fan Award during the 2023 Tokyo Anime Award Festival, placing fourth behind Tiger & Bunny 2, Uta no Prince-sama: Maji Love 1000%, and Mechamato.

Anime News Network reviewers Caitlin Moore, Richard Eisenbeis, Nicholas Dupree, James Beckett, and Rebecca Silverman greatly criticized the premise, calling it "contrived, uncreative, and unfunny". While some praise was given to its art style, the series was also criticized for its "questionable artistic decisions", referring to the character designs and outfit choices.
