= Sōichirō Yamamoto =

Japanese manga artist

Sōichirō Yamamoto 山本 崇一朗
- Born: May 30, 1986 (age 40) Tonoshō, Kagawa, Japan
- Area: Manga artist
- Notable works: Teasing Master Takagi-san; Fudatsuki no Kyōko-chan; In the Heart of Kunoichi Tsubaki; When Will Ayumu Make His Move?; Mane Mane Nichi Nichi
- Awards: Shogakukan Manga Award (2020)

Sōichirō Yamamoto (山本 崇一朗, Yamamoto Sōichirō; born May 30, 1986) is a Japanese manga artist. He is known for writing and illustrating Teasing Master Takagi-san, Fudatsuki no Kyōko-chan, In the Heart of Kunoichi Tsubaki, When Will Ayumu Make His Move? and Mane Mane Nichi Nichi, some of which were run simultaneously during their publication.

== Personal life ==
Yamamoto was born and raised in the town of Tonoshō in Shōdoshima, an island part of Kagawa Prefecture. His hometown would later serve as the setting for Teasing Master Takagi-san.

He is a graduate of Kyoto Seika University Faculty of Art.

== Works ==
=== Manga ===
- Teasing Master Takagi-san (2013–2023, serialized in Monthly Shōnen Sunday)
  - Ashita wa Doyōbi (2014–2015, serialized in Yomiuri Chūkōsei Shimbun)
  - Koi ni Koisuru Yukari-chan (2017–2020, serialized in Monthly Shōnen Sunday, writing only)
  - Karakai Jōzu no (Moto) Takagi-san (2017–2024, serialized in MangaOne, writing only)
  - Karakai Jōzu (?) no Nishikata-san (2023–2024, serialized in Monthly Shōnen Sunday, writing only)
- Fudatsuki no Kyōko-chan (2013–2016, serialized in Monthly Shōnen Sunday)
- In the Heart of Kunoichi Tsubaki (2018–2023, serialized in Monthly Shōnen Sunday)
- When Will Ayumu Make His Move? (2019–2023, serialized in Weekly Shōnen Magazine)
- Kaijū no Tokage (2019–2020, serialized in Bessatsu Shōnen Champion)
- Mane Mane Nichi Nichi (2024–present, serialized in Monthly Shōnen Sunday)
