= Yūko Natsuyoshi =

Japanese voice actress

- 夏吉 ゆうこ
- Born: May 1, 1995 (age 31); Osaka Prefecture, Japan
- Occupation: Voice actress
- Years active: 2018–present
- Agent: Ken Production
- Known for: Show By Rock!! Mashumairesh!! as Himeko Mashima; The Misfit of Demon King Academy as Sasha Necron; Assault Lily as Yuyu Shirai; In the Heart of Kunoichi Tsubaki as Tsubaki; The Legend of Zelda: Link's Awakening as Marin; Blue Archive as Kazusa Kyōyama; Umamusume: Pretty Derby as Cheval Grand

Yūko Natsuyoshi (夏吉 ゆうこ, Natsuyoshi Yūko; born May 1) is a Japanese voice actress from Osaka Prefecture who is affiliated with Ken Production. She is known for her roles as Kazusa in Blue Archive, Himeko Mashima in the Show By Rock!! franchise, Sasha Necron in The Misfit of Demon King Academy, Yuyu Shirai in Assault Lily, Tsubaki in In the Heart of Kunoichi Tsubaki, and Cheval Grand in Umamusume: Pretty Derby.

== Biography ==
Natsuyoshi's voice acting activities began after she won an audition held by the talent agency Ken Production in 2016. After two years of training under Ken Production's voice acting school, she formally became affiliated with them in 2018. She played her first role as a mob character in the anime television series Grand Blue, before being cast in her first main role as Himeko Mashima in the Show By Rock!! franchise.

In 2019, Natsuyoshi voiced Vivian in Journal of the Mysterious Creatures. In 2020, she was cast as Yamada in My Roomie Is a Dino, Sasha Necron in The Misfit of Demon King Academy, and as Yuyu Shirai in Assault Lily Bouquet. She played the role of Yaniko Sato in the anime series Chainsmoker Cat in 2026.

== Filmography ==
=== Anime ===
2018

- Grand Blue, Tinkerbell member C (episode 7)

2019

- Karakuri Circus, Rocket Announcement, Alpha
- Phantasy Star Online 2: Episode Oracle, Operator
- My Hero Academia as Female citizen (episode 68), Female student (episode 72)

2020

- Chihayafuru 3, Recorder, girl, Fujisaki girl student
- Show by Rock!! Mashumairesh!!, Himeko Mashima
- Pokémon Journeys: The Series, Koharu's homeroom teacher, boy
- My Roomie Is a Dino, Yamada
- Motto! Majime ni Fumajime Kaiketsu Zorori, Staff, wife, Polyrin
- Journal of the Mysterious Creatures, Vivian
- The Misfit of Demon King Academy, Sasha Necron
- Assault Lily Bouquet, Yuyu Shirai
- Higurashi: When They Cry – Gou, Waitress
- Cardfight!! Vanguard Gaiden if, Staff A

2021

- Show by Rock!! Stars!!, Himeko Mashima
- I've Been Killing Slimes for 300 Years and Maxed Out My Level, Monk
- To Your Eternity, Village woman, handmaiden, Chan's brother, Mia
- Tsukimichi: Moonlit Fantasy, Reception
- Assault Lily Fruits, Yuyu Shirai
- Mieruko-chan, Female friend A

2022

- She Professed Herself Pupil of the Wise Man, Emera
- Kotaro Lives Alone, Convenience Store Cashier, Woman (episode 2), Boy (episode 5)
- In the Heart of Kunoichi Tsubaki, Tsubaki
- Don't Hurt Me, My Healer!, Medusa
- Shine Post, Rio Seibu

2023

- Umamusume: Pretty Derby, Cheval Grand
- The Misfit of Demon King Academy 2nd Season, Sasha Necron
- Yu-Gi-Oh! Go Rush!!, Dinowa Velgear

2024

- Unnamed Memory, Sylvia
- Blue Miburo, Chirinu Iroha
- Beyblade X, Tenka Shiroboshi

2025

- Princession Orchestra, Mirai Himesaki
- Harmony of Mille-Feuille, Musubu Mayumori
- New Panty & Stocking with Garterbelt, Fastener
- Backstabbed in a Backwater Dungeon, Nemumu
- A Mangaka's Weirdly Wonderful Workplace, Nana Futami

2026

- Cosmic Princess Kaguya!, Kaguya
- Hana-Kimi, Julia Maxwell
- There Was a Cute Girl in the Hero's Party, So I Tried Confessing to Her, Mikana
- Medalist 2nd Season, Sana Niwatori
- Yowayowa Sensei, Kaya Kuguri
- Chainsmoker Cat, Yanineko
- Grow Up Show: Sunflower Circus, Akane Yura
- Magical Sisters LuluttoLilly, Shiromofu
- Yu-Gi-Oh! Card Game The Chronicles, Edel
- Cyberpunk: Edgerunners 2, Yupi

2027

- Jimoto no Ijimekko-tachi ni Shikaeshi Shiyōto Shitara, Betsu no Tatakai ga Hajimatta, Kanae Oborozuki

=== Video games ===
2019

- The Legend of Zelda: Link's Awakening, Marin
- Pokémon Masters, Whitney
- Touhou Cannonball, Minamitsu Murasa

2020

- Last Period, Furau
- Magia Record, Meguru Hibiki
- Show By Rock!! Fes A Live, Himeko Mashima
- Sakura Kakumei: Hanasaku Otome-tachi, Asebi Mikohama

2021

- Assault Lily Last Bullet, Yuyu Shirai
- A Certain Magical Index: Imaginary Fest, Ayame Fusō

2022

- Azur Lane, Alfredo Oriani
- Blue Archive, Kazusa Kyōyama

2023

- Umamusume: Pretty Derby, Cheval Grand
- Hyperdimension Neptunia GameMaker R:Evolution, Pipi
- Riichi City, Inukai Hina

2025

- Stella Sora, Iris/Ayame

2026

- The Legend of Zelda: Ocarina of Time, Princess Ruto

=== Dubbing ===
- Thanksgiving, Gaby (Addison Rae)
