= Kanna Nakamura =

Japanese voice actress

- 中村 カンナ
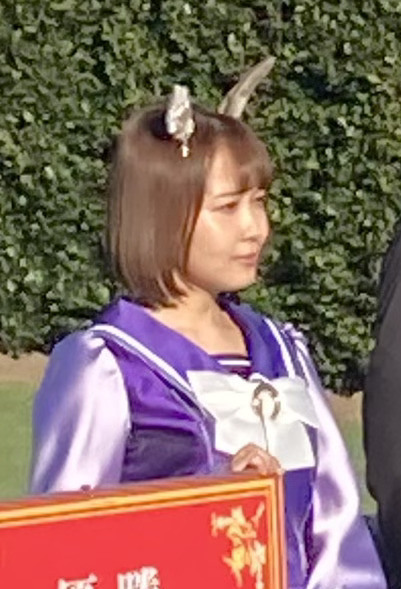
- Nakamura promoting Umamusume: Pretty Derby in December 2022.
- Born: October 26
- Occupation: Voice actress
- Years active: 2018–present
- Agent: Rush Style
- Notable work: When Will Ayumu Make His Move? as Urushi Yaotome; Umamusume: Pretty Derby as Narita Top Road; Saint Cecilia and Pastor Lawrence as Hazelita; There's No Freaking Way I'll be Your Lover! Unless... as Renako Amaori

Kanna Nakamura (中村 カンナ, Nakamura Kanna; born October 26) is a Japanese voice actress who is affiliated with Rush Style. She started her voice acting activities in 2018, and in 2022, she played her first main role as Urushi Yaotome in the anime series When Will Ayumu Make His Move?.

== Biography ==
From childhood, Nakamura had a tendency to make people laugh. However, she developed a complex about her appearance as she was fat, and wanted to find a field where she could overcome this complex. She was first inspired to pursue voice acting after seeing Miyuki Sawashiro's performance in the anime series Rozen Maiden, an interest that further developed when she became a teenager and became a fan of Yukari Tamura.

Nakamura moved to Tokyo after graduating from high school, and started attending voice acting school while in university. After spending two years at one school, she transferred to a training school run by the talent agency Rush Style. She became affiliated with Rush Style after finishing her training and started her activities in 2018. Among her earliest roles was in the Japanese version of the visual novel The Fox Awaits Me, which was released in 2020.

In 2022, Nakamura was cast in her first main role as Urushi Yaotome in the anime series When Will Ayumu Make His Move?, where she also performed the series' ending theme "50 Centi" (50センチ). She has also been cast as Narita Top Road in the multimedia franchise Umamusume: Pretty Derby. The following year, she was cast in the roles of Hazelita in Saint Cecilia and Pastor Lawrence and Anne in Four Knights of the Apocalypse.

== Filmography ==
=== Anime ===
2022

- When Will Ayumu Make His Move?, Urushi Yaotome

2023

- Saint Cecilia and Pastor Lawrence, Hazelita
- Four Knights of the Apocalypse, Anne
- Classroom for Heroes, Une

2024

- Gods' Games We Play, Nel Reckless
- I'll Become a Villainess Who Goes Down in History, Alicia Williams
- Himitsu no AiPri as Miss Macaroon

2025

- The Gorilla God's Go-To Girl, Sofia Reeler
- The Too-Perfect Saint: Tossed Aside by My Fiancé and Sold to Another Kingdom, Himari
- Secrets of the Silent Witch, Lana Colette
- There's No Freaking Way I'll be Your Lover! Unless..., Renako Amaori
- Pass the Monster Meat, Milady!, Melphiera Marchalrayd

2026

- High School! Kimengumi, Kiri Ichidō
- Haibara's Teenage New Game+, Miori Motomiya
- Super Psychic Policeman Chojo, Lily Togari

=== Web animation ===
2023

- Umamusume: Pretty Derby - Road to the Top, Narita Top Road

=== Video games ===
- The Fox Awaits Me, Mimiru
- Umamusume: Pretty Derby, Narita Top Road
- Arknights, Poncirus
- Aether Gazer, Kuramitsuha
- Azur Lane, Azuchi
