= Yabakei Bridge =

Japanese bridge

Yabakei Bridge 耶馬渓橋
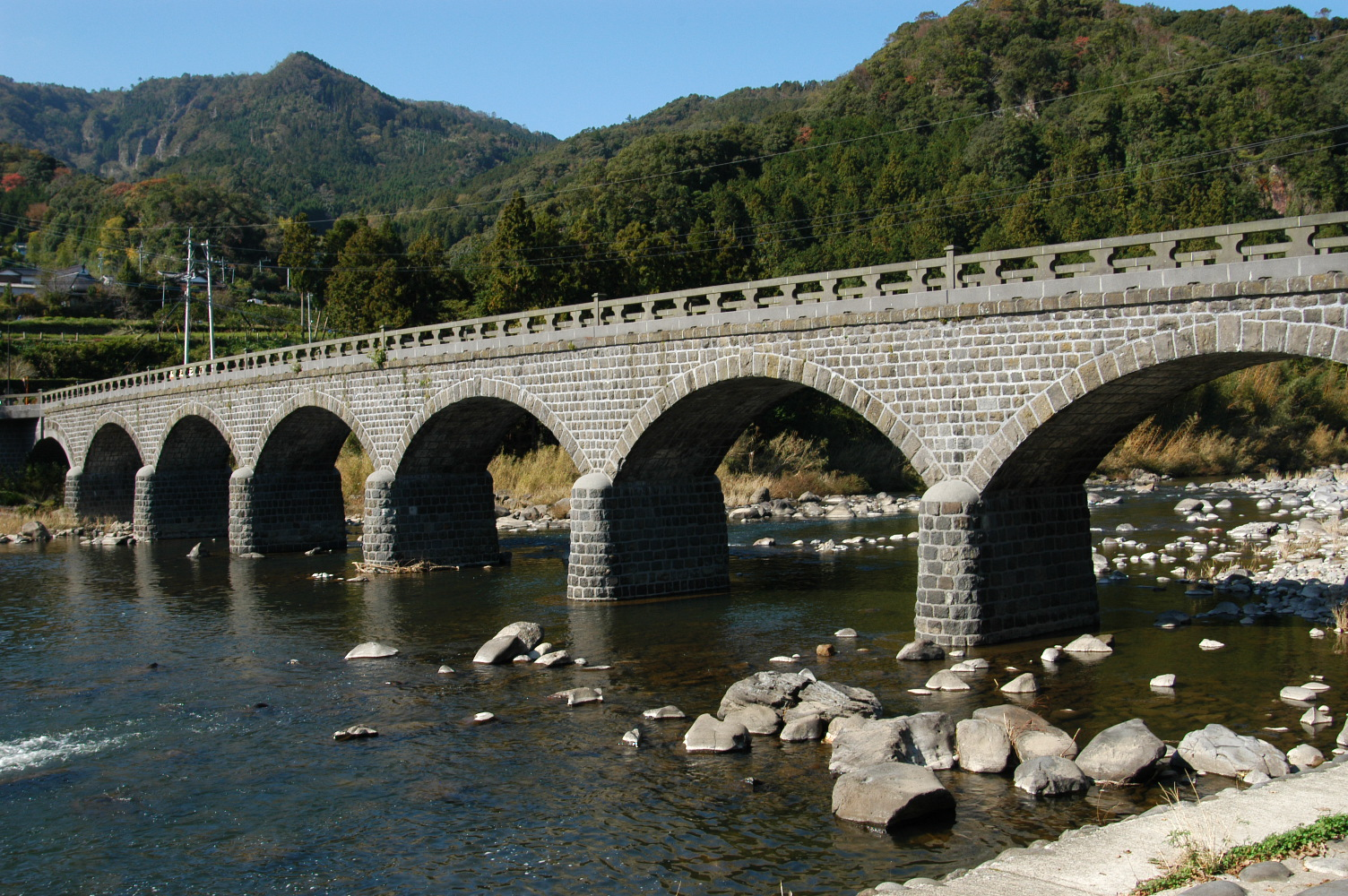
- Coordinates: 33°30′11″N 131°10′12″E
- Crosses: Yamakuni River
- Locale: Nakatsu, Ōita Prefecture, Japan
- Heritage status: Important Cultural Property

Characteristics
- Material: Stone
- Total length: 115.7 metres (380 ft)
- Width: 4.5 metres (15 ft)

History
- Construction start: November 1920
- Construction end: 29 March 1923

Location
- Interactive map of Yabakei Bridge

Yabakei Bridge (耶馬渓橋, Yabakei-bashi) is a Taishō-era stone bridge over the Yamakuni River in Yabakei, Nakatsu, Ōita Prefecture, Japan. Construction work on the eight-arched bridge, built as part of a tourist road for the viewing of the nearby Aonodōmon, began in 1920 and was completed in 1923; repair and restoration work took place in 1999. At 115.7 metres (380 ft) in length, it is the longest stone bridge in the country, and has been designated an Important Cultural Property.

== See also ==
- List of Places of Scenic Beauty of Japan (Ōita)
