= Yabakei Dam =

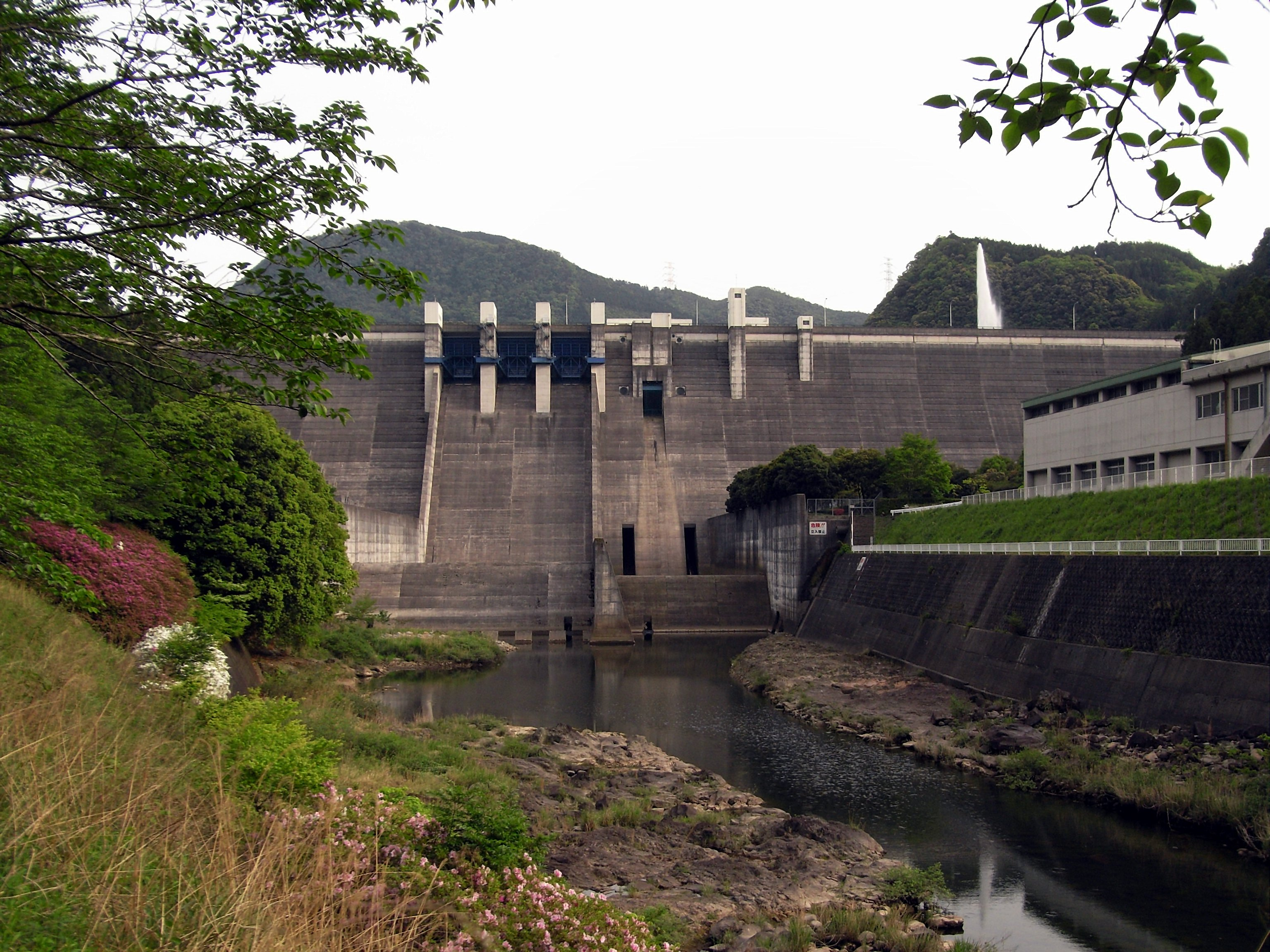
- Interactive map of Yabakei Dam
- Location: Ōita Prefecture, Japan
- Coordinates: 33°26′49″N 131°07′27″E
- Construction began: 1970
- Opening date: 1984

Dam and spillways
- Height: 62.0 m (203.4 ft)

Reservoir
- Creates: Yabakeiko
- Total capacity: 23,300,000 cubic metres (820,000,000 cu ft)

Yabakei Dam (Japanese: 耶馬溪ダム) is a dam in the Ōita Prefecture, Japan.

== Overview ==
The Yabakei Dam is a 62.0 meter high gravity-type concrete dam under the direct control of the Ministry of Land, Infrastructure, Transport and Tourism managed by the Kyushu Regional Development Bureau of the Ministry of Land, Infrastructure, Transport and Tourism. It is the main dam in the Yamakuni River system, and is a specific multipurpose dam for the purpose of hydraulic control, water utilization and hydroelectric power generation from the Yamakuni River's tributary the Yamautsuri River. Together with the Heisei Ozeki Barrage, which is located downstream, it occupies an important position not only in Nakatsu City but also in Kitakyushu City, Fukuoka Prefecture and the Kyogetsu area.

- Flood control capacity - 11.2 million m^{3}
- Water utilization capacity - 9.8 million m^{3}
  - Unspecified irrigation water - 5.5 million m^{3}
  - Urban water and power generation (subordinate) - 4.3 million m^{3}

At the survey stage, it was tentatively named Kakisaka Dam, which is derived from the large character of the location's name, but before the start of construction, the name was changed to Yabakei Dam, which was named after the scenic Yabakei, which is the best tourist destination in the area.

== Yabakei Lake ==
The artificial lake formed by the dam is named Yabakeiko. However, although it bears the name of Yabakei, it is not designated as a Yaba-Hita Hidehikoyama National Monument. Yabakei Lake has a fountain and the scenery of the dam is beautiful, so it is known as a tourist spot in Nakatsu City.

In 1994, Japan's first public water ski facility, Yamaki Aqua Park, opened, and in addition to water skiing, you can now enjoy wakeboarding and banana boats. It used to be closed in winter, but has been open all year since 2006
