= Yamakuni River =

River in Ōita Prefecture, Japan

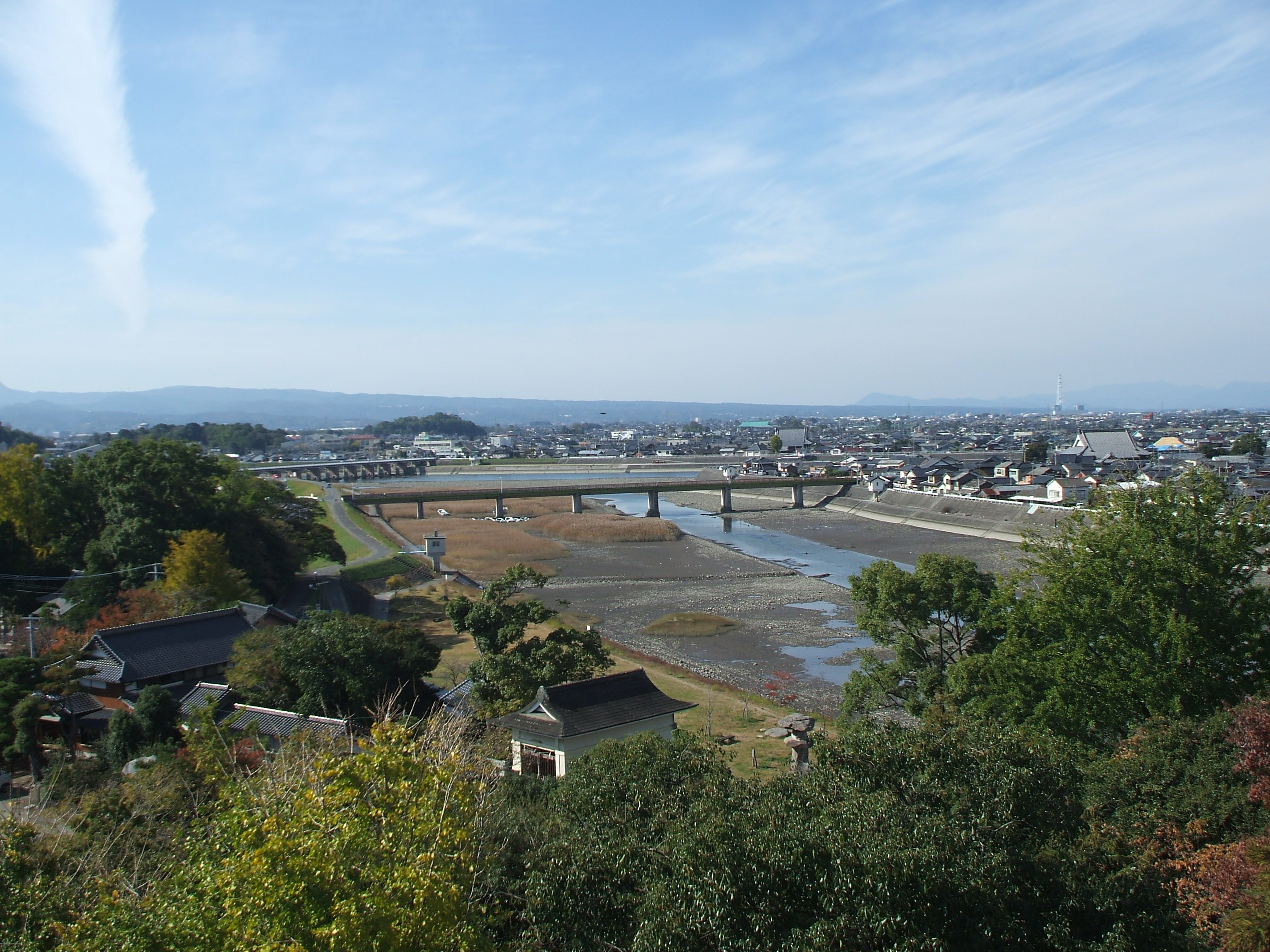

- Location within Japan
- Native name: 山国川 (Japanese)

Location
- Island: Kyushu
- Region: Ōita Prefecture, Fukuoka Prefecture

Physical characteristics
- Mouth
  - location: Yoshitomi, Fukuoka, Nakatsu, Ōita
  - coordinates: 33°37′06″N 131°11′10″E
- Length: 56 km (35 mi)
- Basin size: 540 km^{2} (210 sq mi)
- Discharge
  - maximum: 4800 cubic meters/s in 1944

The Yamakuni River (山国川, Yamakuni-gawa) is a Class A river that flows through the Ōita Prefecture in Japan. In its lower reaches it provides the boundary to the Fukuoka Prefecture to the west.

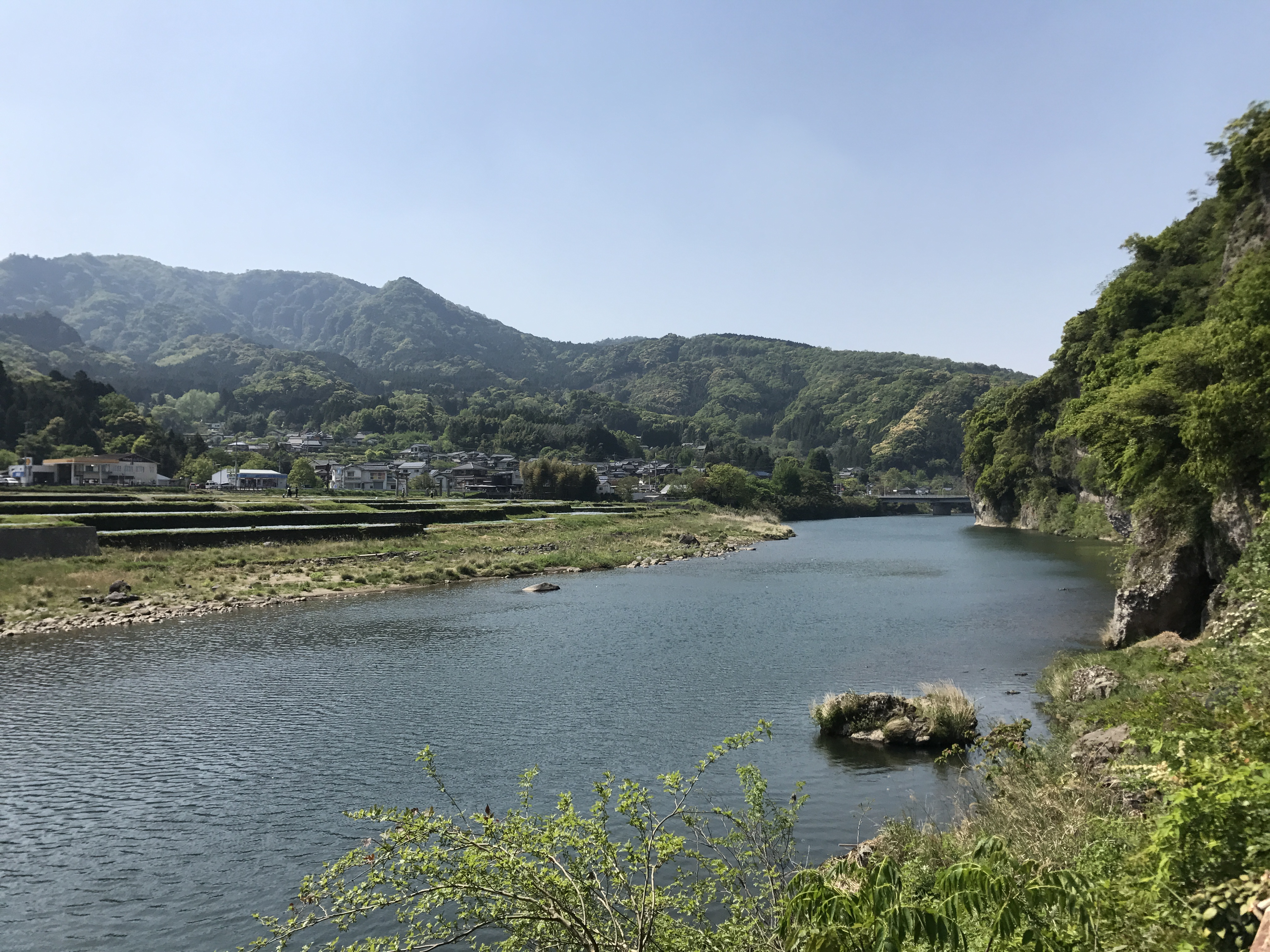
Yamakuni River near Aonodōmon Tunnel

The Yamakuni River arises on the slopes of the sacred Mount Hiko on the border of Oita and Fukuoka prefectures, flowing towards the sea through the Yabakei and Nakatsu plains, and empties into the Seto Inland Sea. Tributaries include the Yamaoi River, Atoda River and Yamautsuri River.

It is known as the largest rapid river in Kyushu, and when torrential rain occurs in the upper reaches, a large amount of rain flows down in a short time, which has the characteristic of causing flooding.

== Structures ==
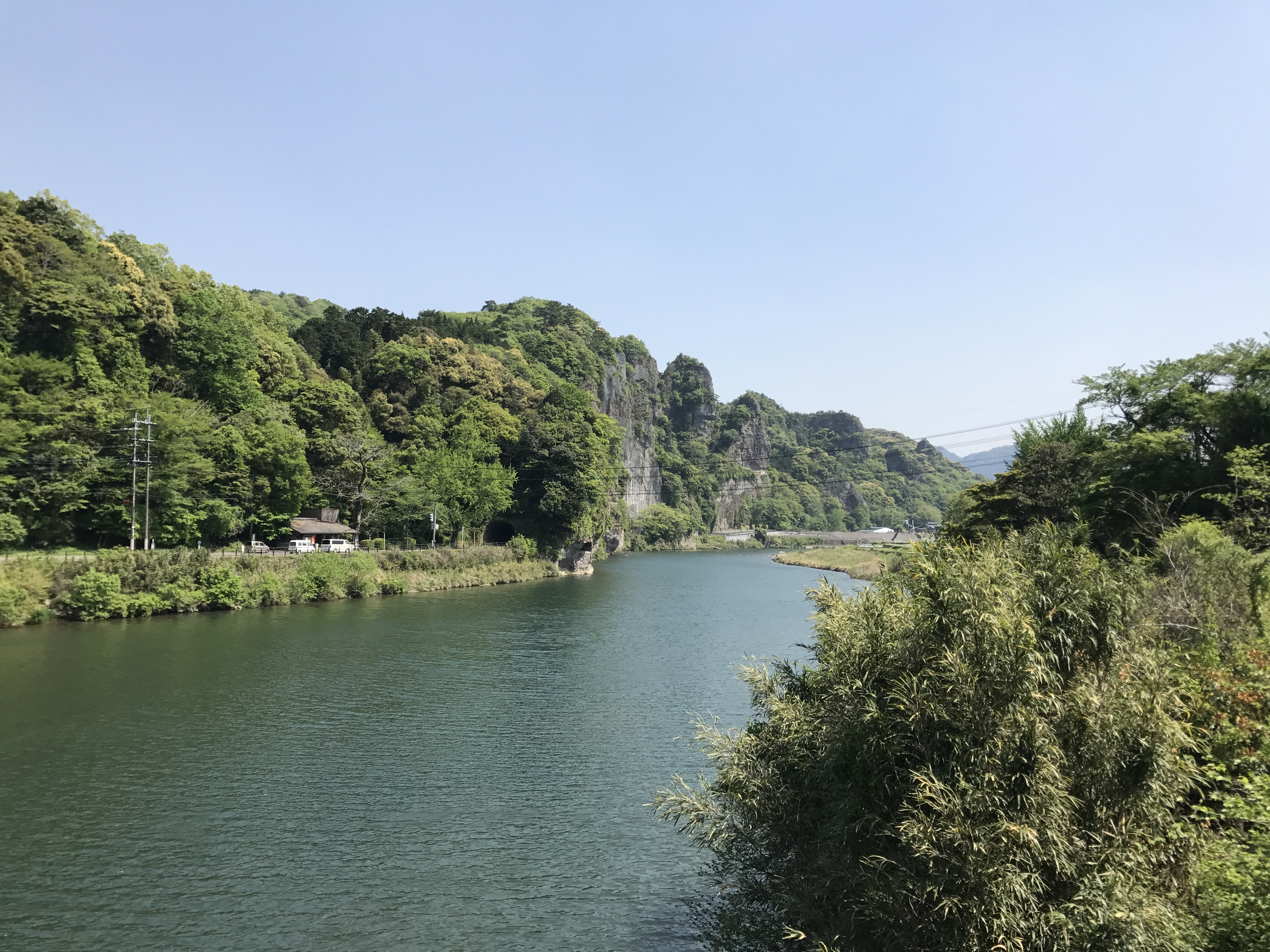
Yamakuni River from Domombashi Bridge

The Yabakei Dam on a tributary, the Yamautsuri River, and Heisei Ozeki Barrage, help control the river system.

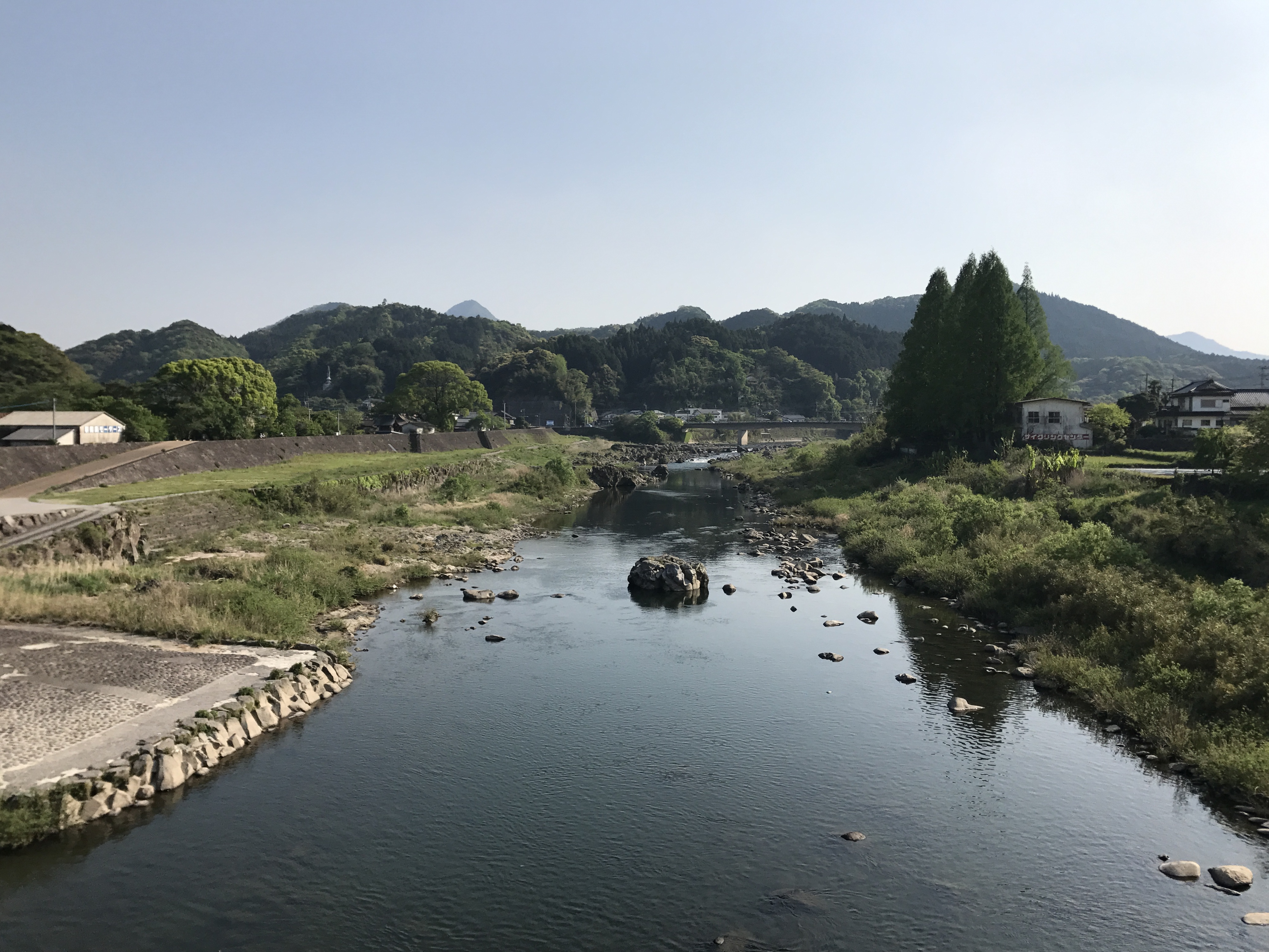
Yamakuni River from Zenkaibashi Bridge

The Yabakei Bridge over it, is the longest stone bridge in Japan.

== Tourism ==
It runs through the Yabakei Gorge (Shinyabakei Gorge) and is adjacent to Aonodōmon (Blue Tunnel) in the Yaba-Hita-Hikosan Quasi-National Park. Its upper reaches include the scenic Marinkyo Gorge.

== History ==
Significant floods have occurred in September 1944 (typhoon), September 1993 (typhoon) and July 2012. Drought is also frequent and was recorded in 9 of the first 31 years after the construction of the Heisei flood barrier.
