= Three Views of Japan =

Groupings of Japanese scenic sights

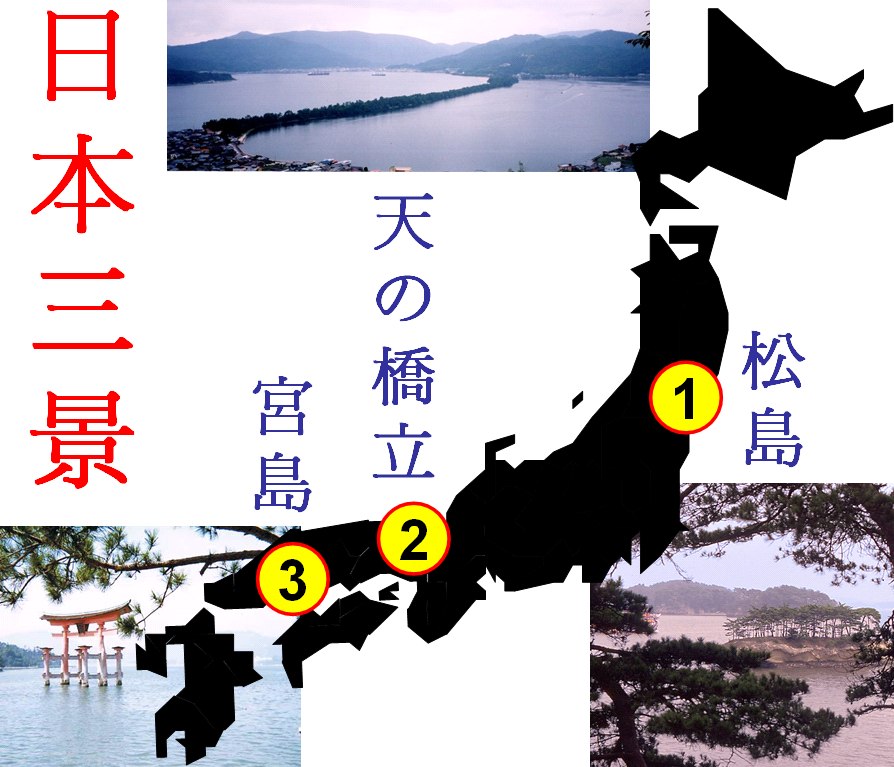
Three Views of Japan (Nihon sankei): 1. Matsushima; 2. Amanohashidate; 3. Miyajima

The Three Views of Japan (日本三景, Nihon Sankei) is the canonical list of Japan's three most celebrated scenic sights, attributed to a 1643 book by the scholar Hayashi Gahō.

In 1915, modeled on the old Three Views of Japan, Jitsugyo no Nihon Sha (株式会社実業之日本社) held a national election to determine a list of New Three Views of Japan.

== Three Views of Japan ==
Locations of the Three Views of Japan:
- Classic
- New
- Night
- New Night
1 Matsushima Bay, Miyagi Prefecture
2 Amanohashidate, Kyoto Prefecture
3 Itsukushima (Miyajima), Hiroshima Prefecture
4 Ōnuma, Hokkaidō Prefecture
5 Miho no Matsubara, Shizuoka Prefecture
6 Yabakei, Nakatsu, Ōita Prefecture
7 Hakodate (from Mount Hakodate), Hokkaidō Prefecture
8 Kobe & Osaka Bay (from Mount Maya), Hyōgo Prefecture
9 Nagasaki (from Mount Inasa), Nagasaki Prefecture
10 Kitakyushu (from Mount Sarakura), Fukuoka Prefecture
11 Nara (from Mount Wakakusa), Nara Prefecture
12 Kōfu Basin (from Fuefukigawa Fruit Park (ja), Yamanashi Prefecture

The views are of the eponymous pine-clad islands of Matsushima in Miyagi Prefecture; the pine-clad sandbar of Amanohashidate in Kyoto Prefecture; and Itsukushima Shrine in Hiroshima Prefecture. All three are designated Special Places of Scenic Beauty, while Itsukushima is also a Special Historic Site and a UNESCO World Heritage Site.

=== Coordinates ===
These are the coordinates of the Three Views of Japan.

- Matsushima Bay, Miyagi Prefecture 38°21′59.1″N 141°4′26.6″E
- Amanohashidate, Kyoto Prefecture 35°34′12.4″N 135°11′31.1″E
- Itsukushima (Miyajima), Hiroshima Prefecture 34°17′45.6″N 132°19′11.4″E

=== Gallery ===
Three Views of Japan

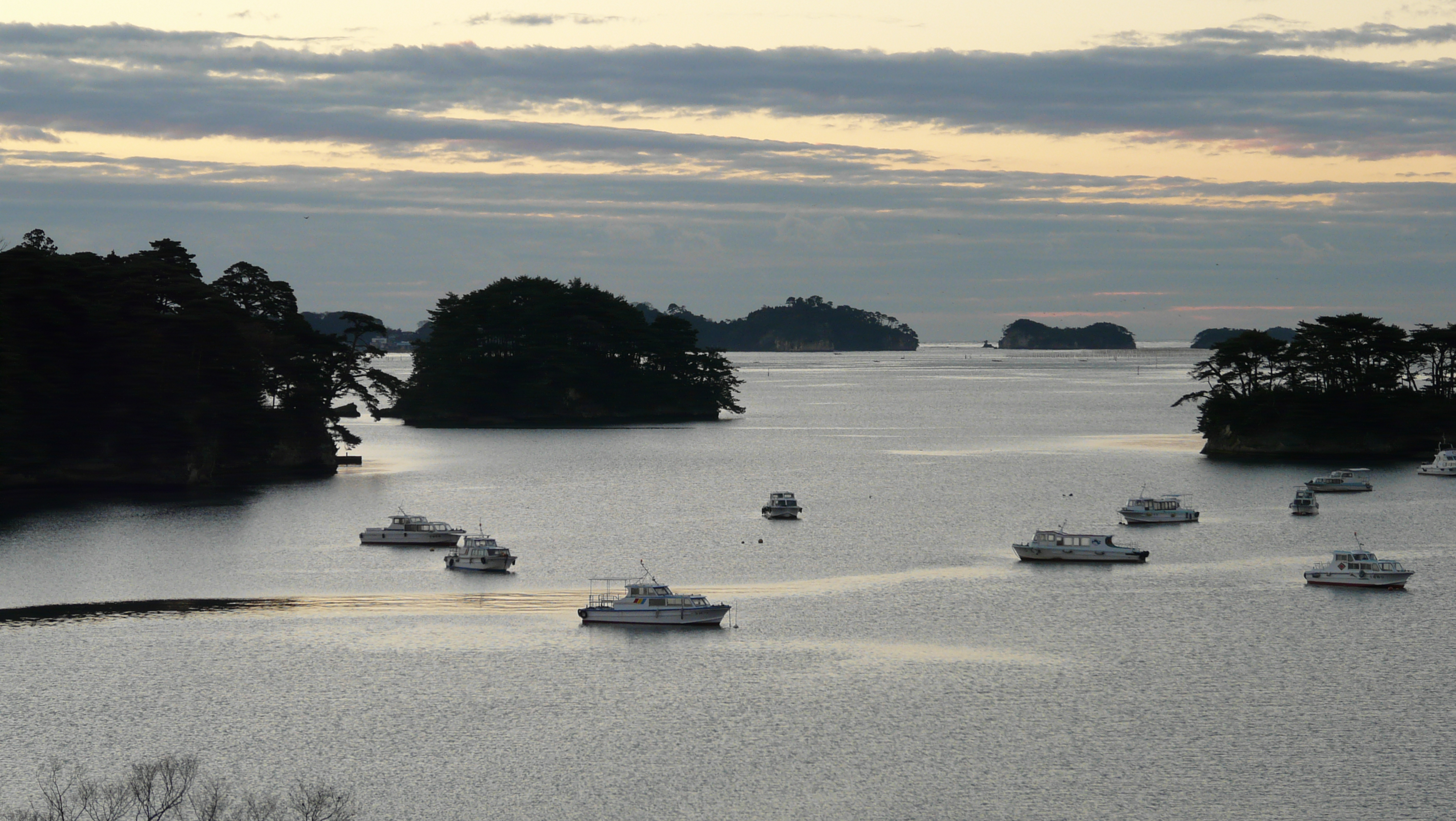
Pine-clad islands of Matsushima

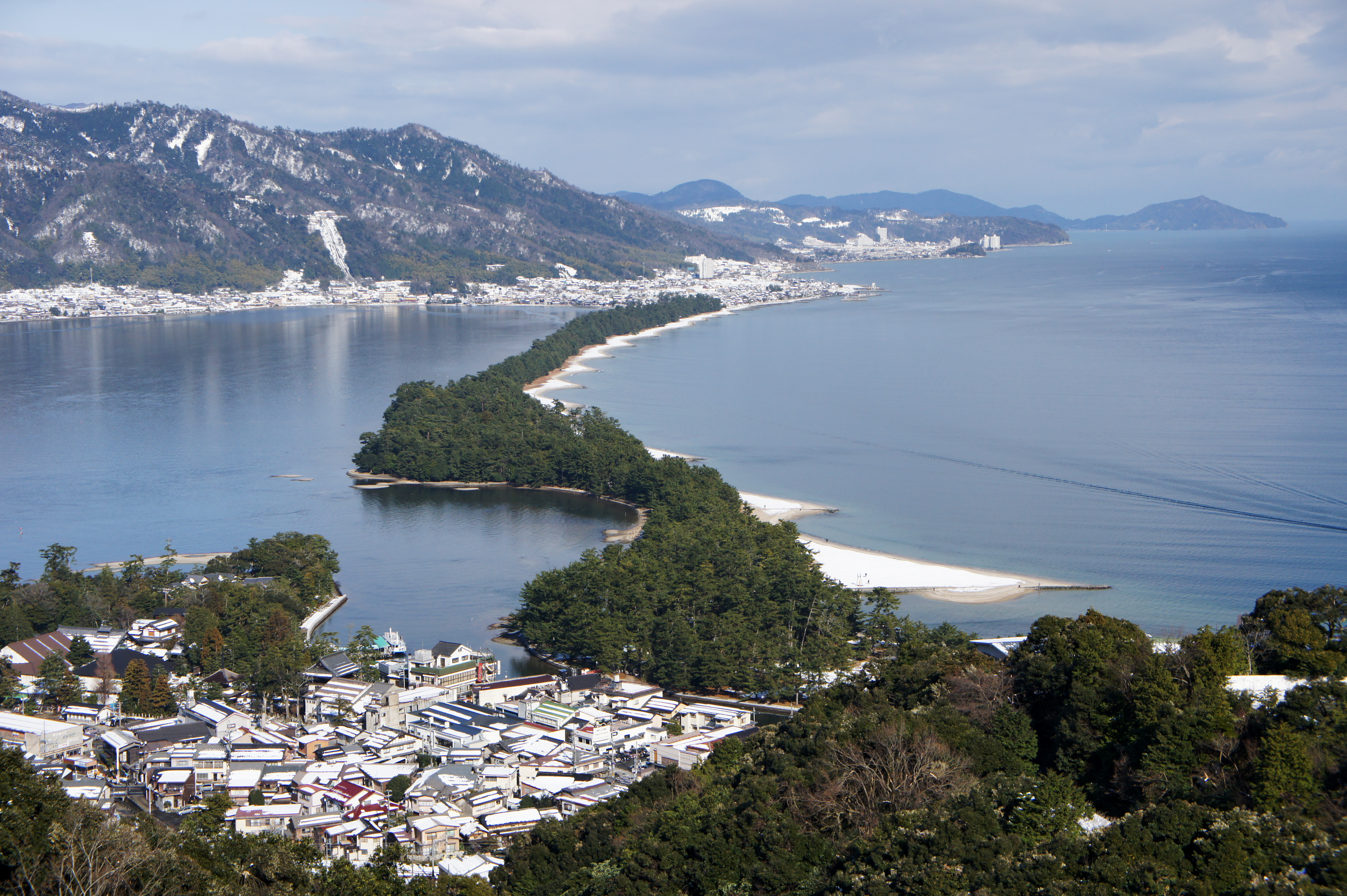
Sandbar of Amanohashidate

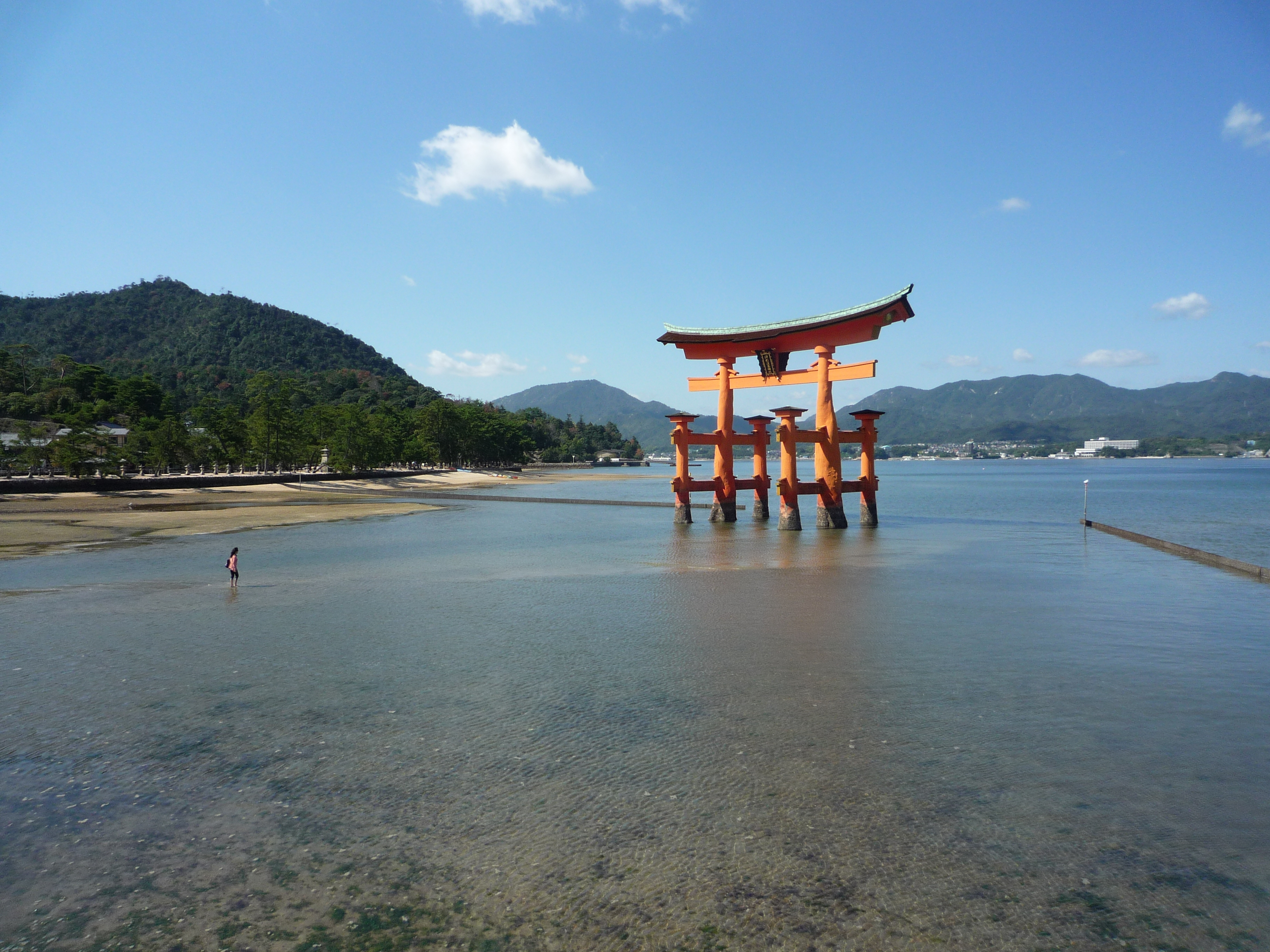
Torii at Itsukushima Shrine

== New Three Views of Japan ==
The New Three Views of Japan are:

- Ōnuma (大沼), a big pond in Ōnuma Quasi-National Park, which is at the town Nanae and the east side of Oshima Peninsula in southwest Hokkaidō
- Miho no Matsubara (三保の松原), a pine grove in the Miho Peninsula, in the Shimizu-ku area of Shizuoka
- Yabakei (耶馬渓), a section of river and valley at the upstream and midstream of Yamakuni River (山国川), in Nakatsu, Ōita, Kyūshū

=== Gallery ===
New Three Views of Japan

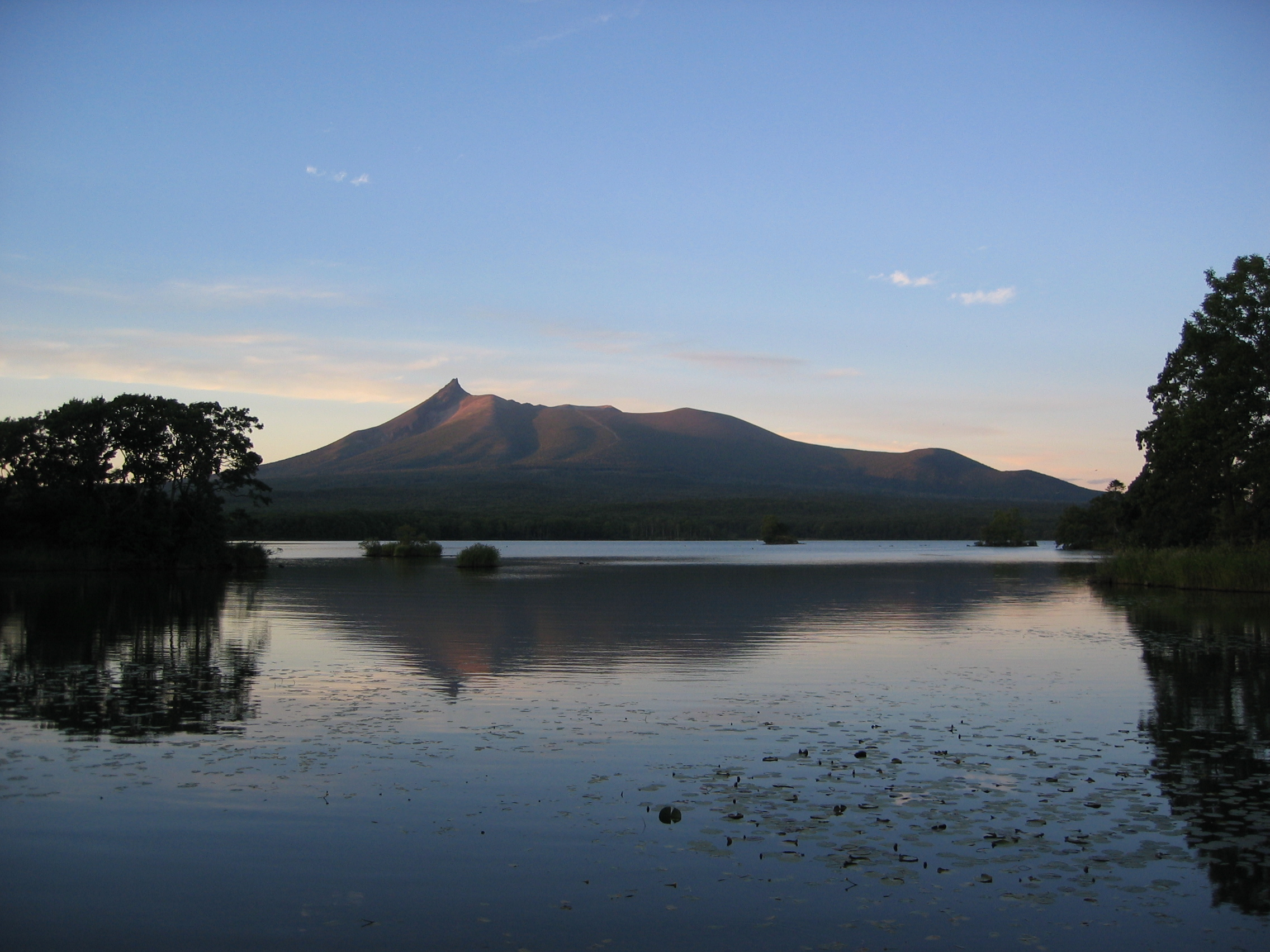
Ōnuma

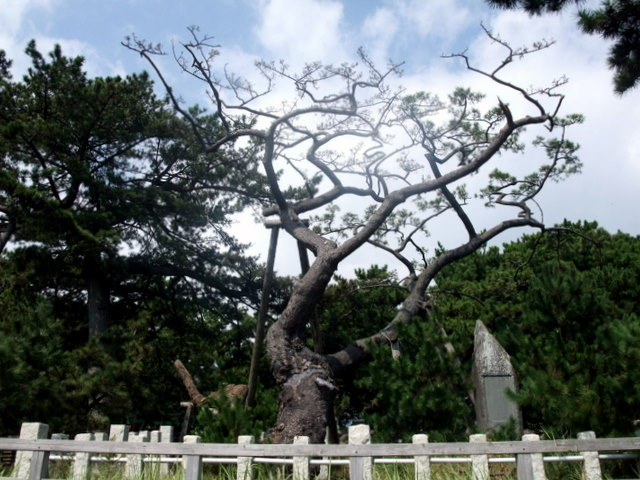
Hagoromo no Matsu at Miho no Matsubara

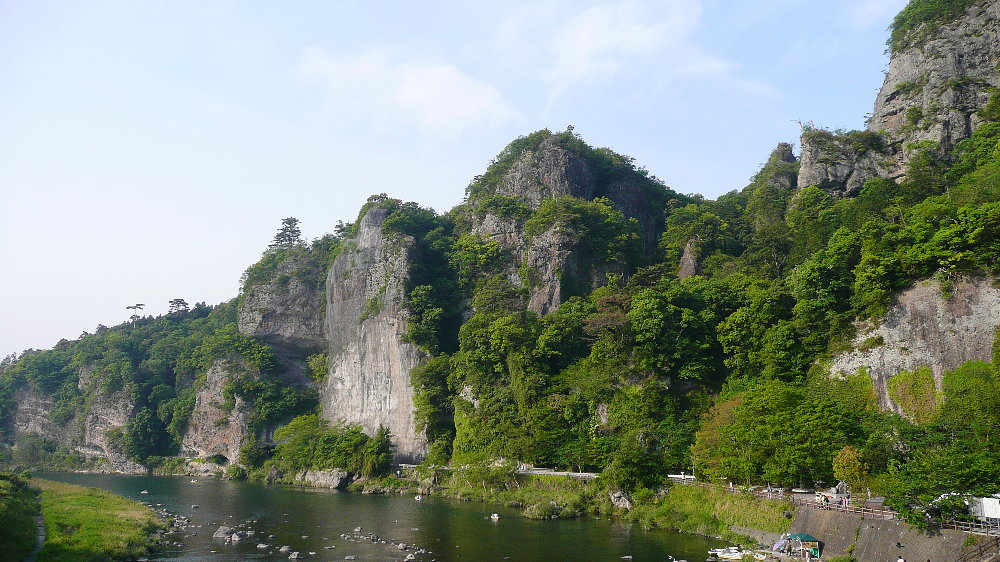
Yabakei

== Three Major Night Views of Japan ==
The Three Major Night Views of Japan are:

- Hakodate seen from Mount Hakodate in Hokkaido
- Kobe and Osaka Bay seen from Maya Mountains in Hyōgo Prefecture
- Nagasaki seen from Mount Inasa in Nagasaki Prefecture.

All three are called ten million dollar night views, while Michelin Green Guide: Japan gave the Mount Hakodate experience 3/3 stars in a review, placing it as equal to mountain views of Naples and Hong Kong.

=== Gallery ===
Three Major Night Views of Japan

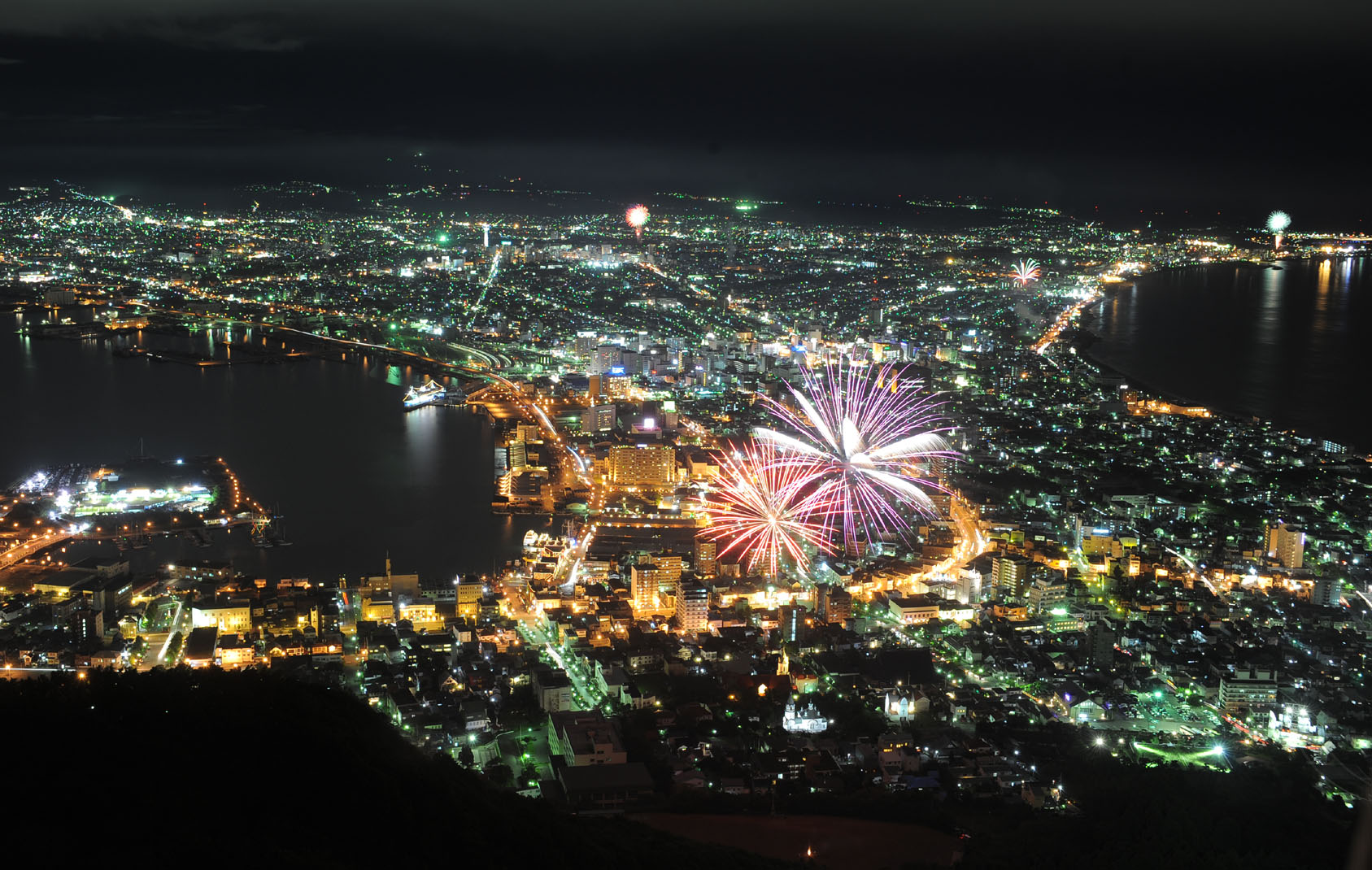
Night view from Mount Hakodate

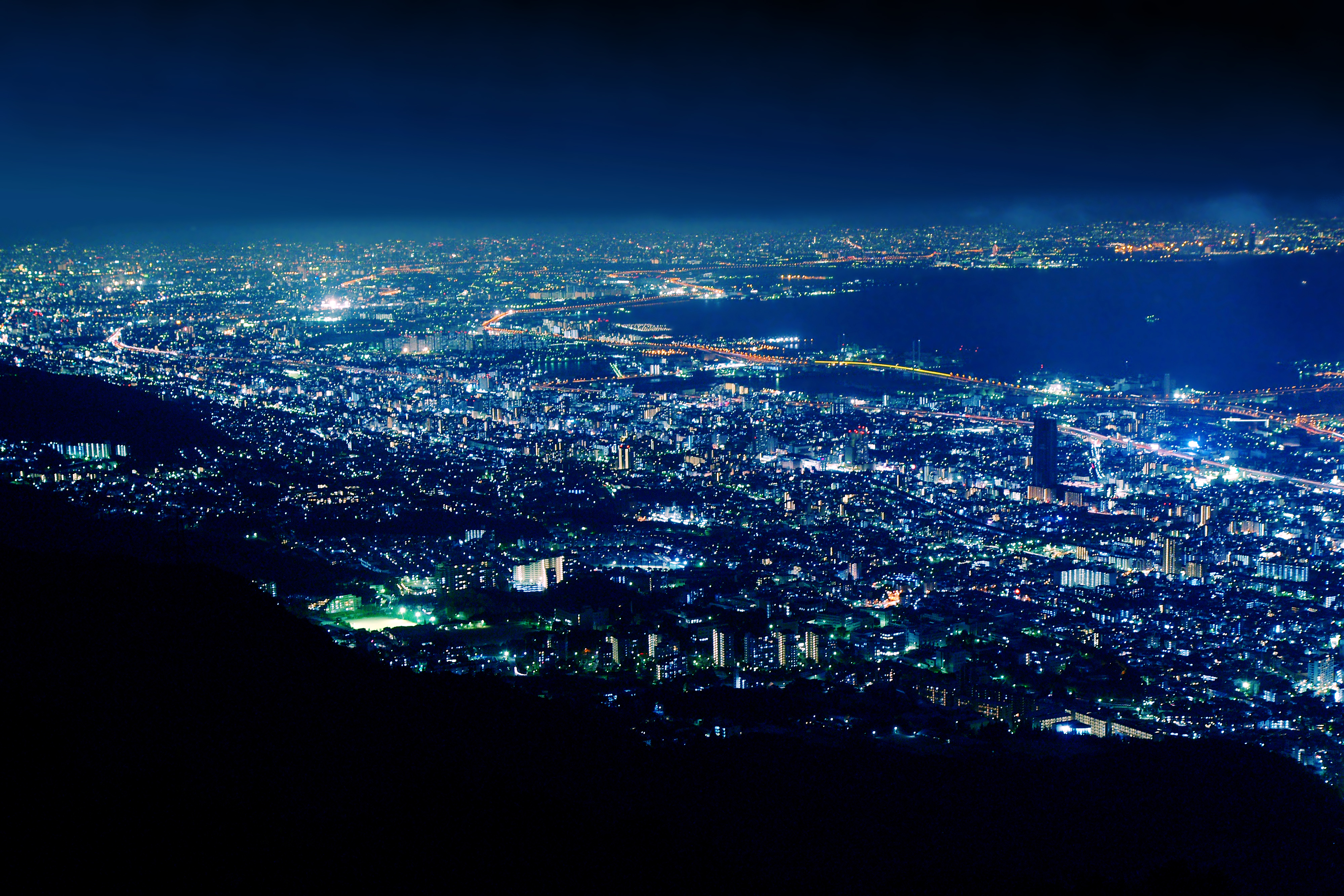
Ten Million Dollar Night View, Kobe

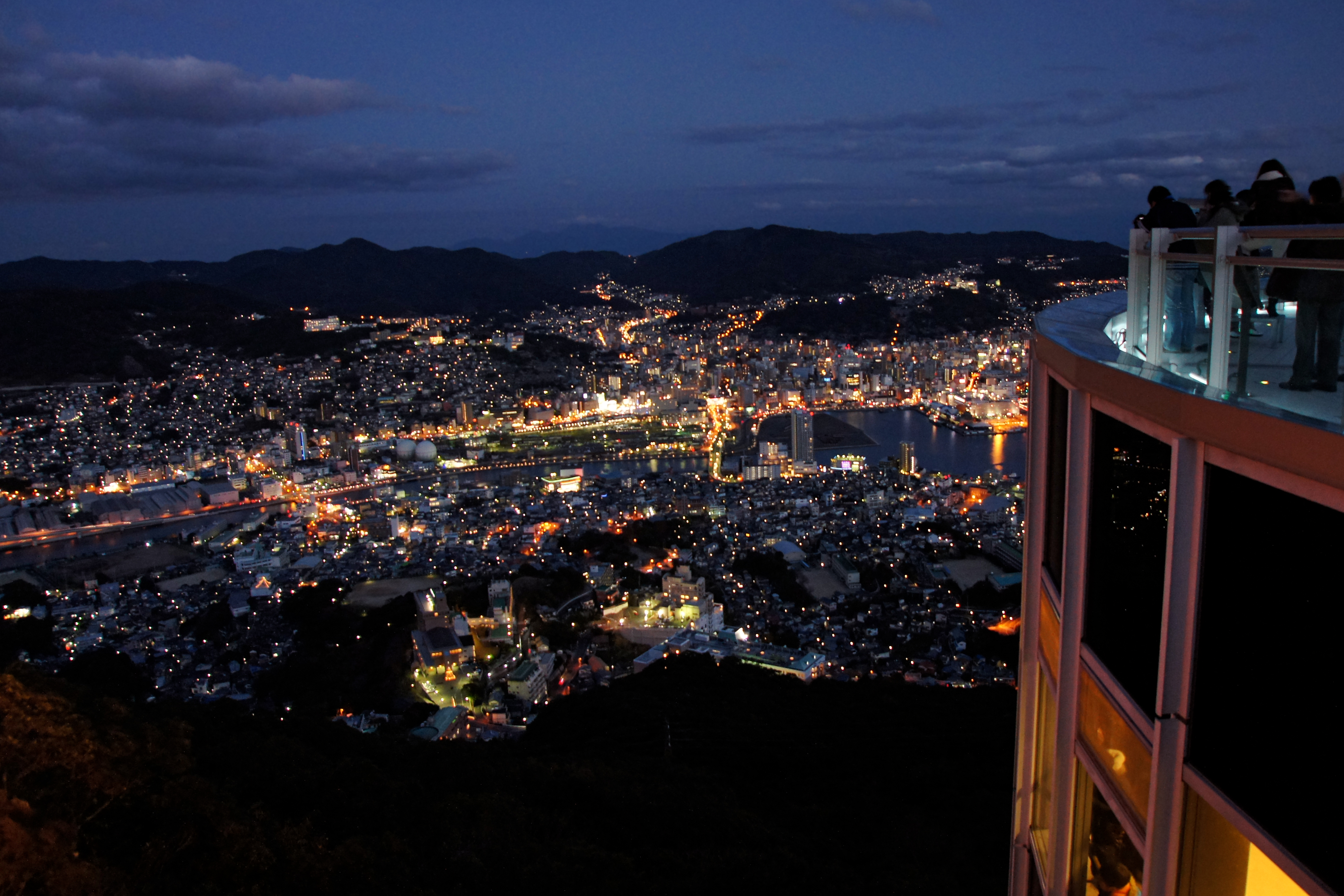
Night view of Nagasaki city

== New Three Major Night Views of Japan ==
The New Three Major Night Views of Japan are:

- Views of Kitakyushu from Mount Sarakura (皿倉山), a mountain in Kitakyūshū Quasi-National Park, which is at the city of Kitakyushu in Fukuoka Prefecture, Kyūshū.
- Views of Nara from Mount Wakakusa (若草山), a mountain located in the east of Nara Park.
- Views of Kōfu Basin from Yamanashi Fuefukigawa Fruit Park (山梨県笛吹川フルーツ公園), a city park in Yamanashi, Yamanashi Prefecture.

=== Gallery ===
New Three Major Night Views of Japan

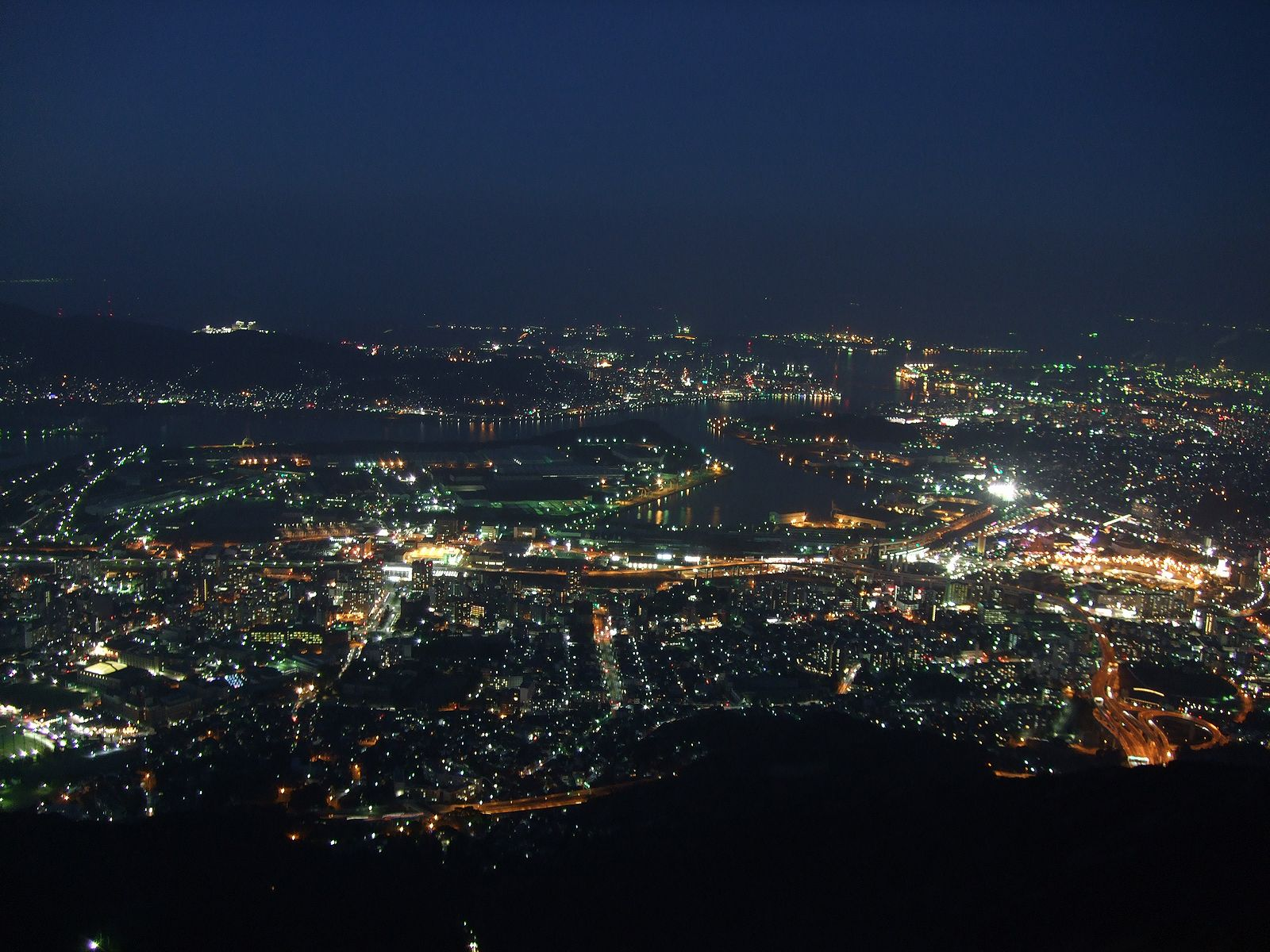
Night view from Mount Sarakura.

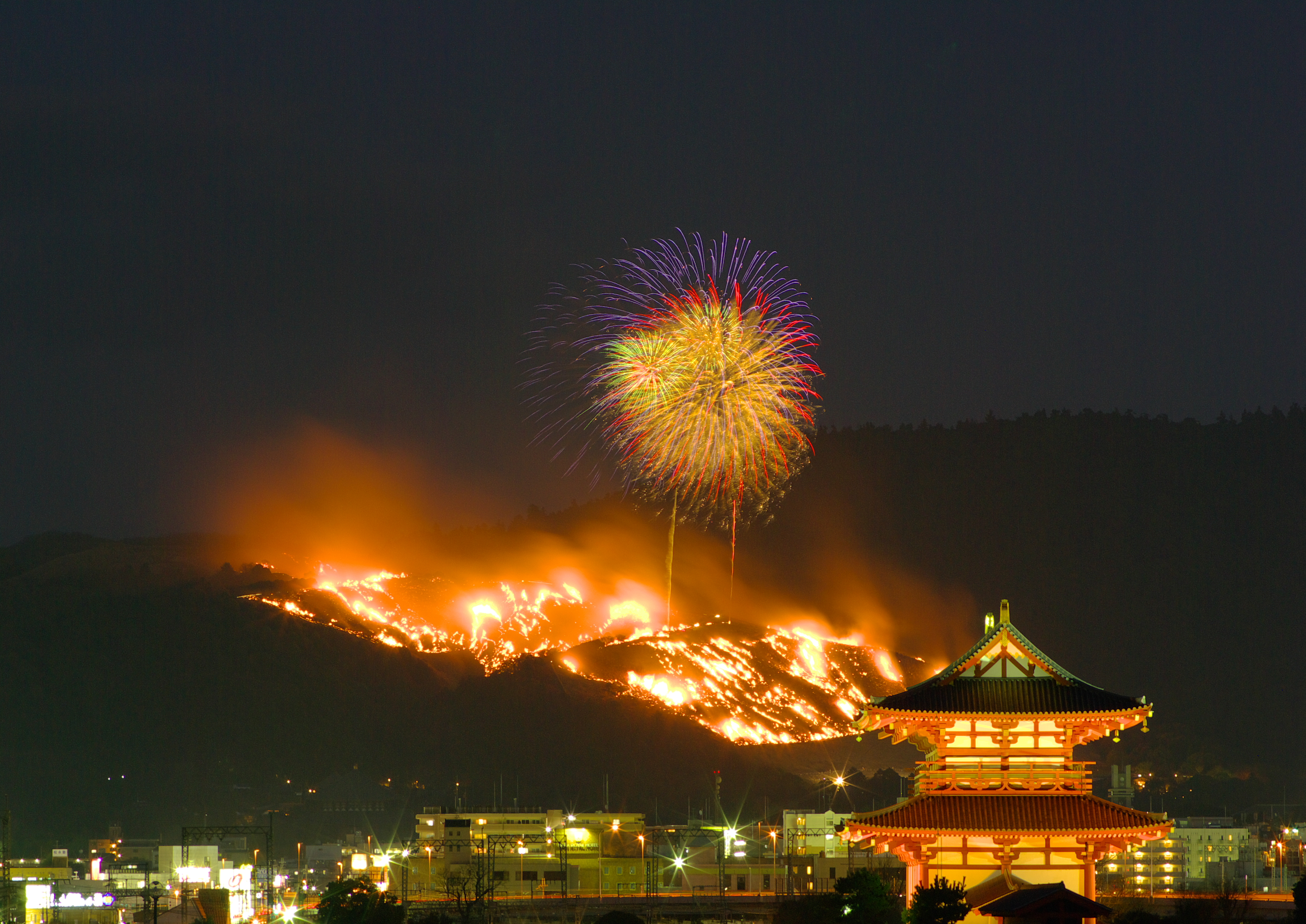
Burning the dead grass at Mount Wakakusa.

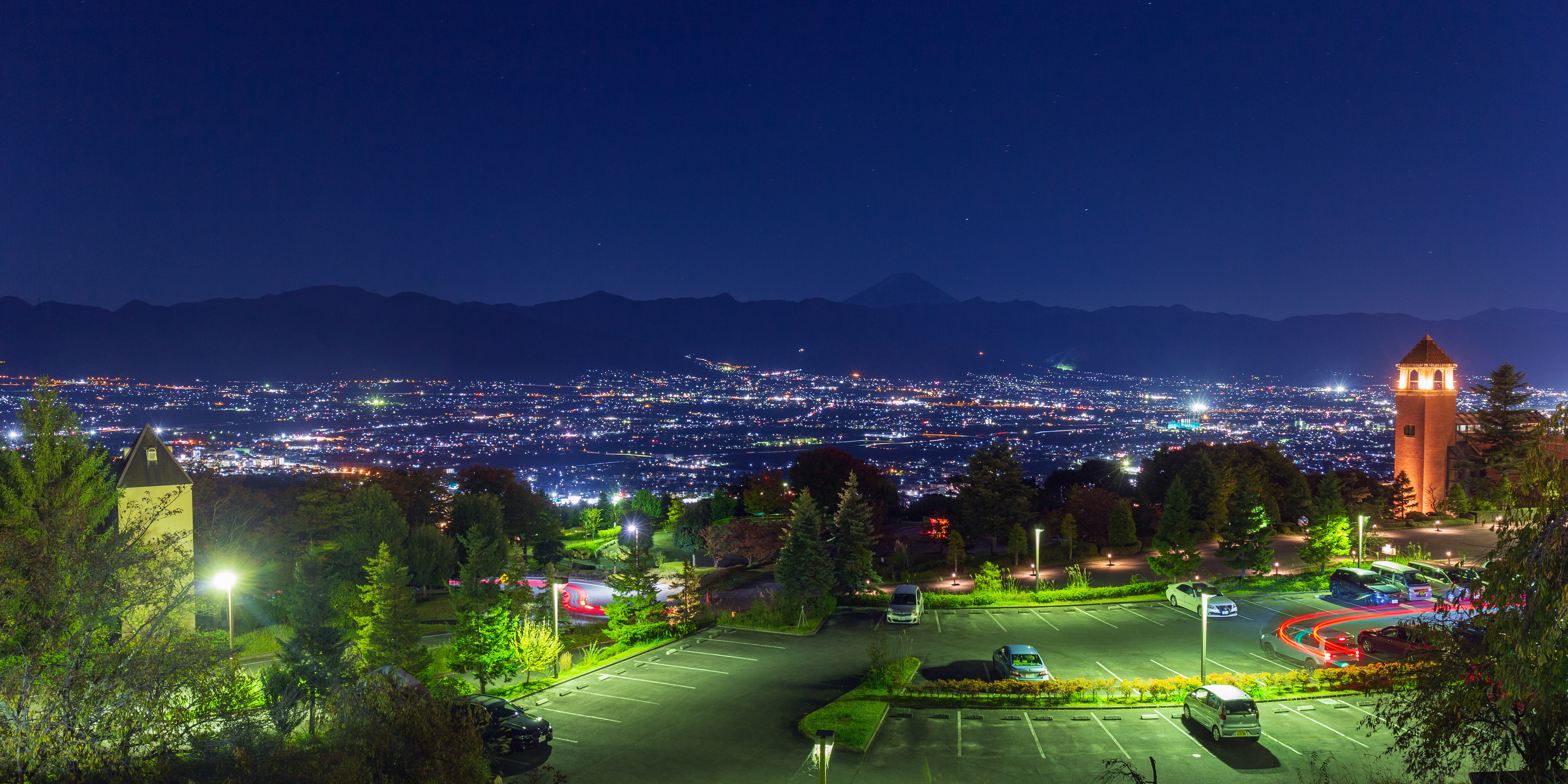
Kōfu Basin from Yamanashi Prefecture Fuefukigawa Fruit Park.

== See also ==
- List of Special Places of Scenic Beauty, Special Historic Sites and Special Natural Monuments
- 100 Landscapes of Japan (Heisei era)
- 100 Landscapes of Japan (Shōwa era)
- 100 Soundscapes of Japan
- Three Great Gardens of Japan
- Three Holy Mountains of Japan
- Tourism in Japan
- UNESCO World Heritage Sites in Japan
- Thirty-six Views of Mount Fuji (disambiguation)
