= List of places of scenic beauty of Japan (Ōita) =

This list is of the places of scenic beauty of Japan located within the Prefecture of Ōita.

== National Places of Scenic Beauty ==
As of 1 December 2025, seven Places have been designated at a national level.

Site	Municipality	Comments	Image	Coordinates	Type	Ref.
Former Kurushima Family Gardens 旧久留島氏庭園; Kyū-Kurushima-shi teien	Kusu			33°16′50″N 131°09′12″E	1	
Hells of Beppu 別府の地獄; Beppu-no-jigoku	Beppu			33°18′55″N 131°28′27″E	9	
Yabakei 耶馬渓; Yabakei	Hita, Usa, Nakatsu	within Yaba-Hita-Hikosan Quasi-National Park		33°26′18″N 131°14′19″E	5, 6	
Tennen-ji Yaba - Mudō-ji Yaba 天念寺耶馬及び無動寺耶馬; Tennen-ji Yaba oyobi Mudō-ji Yaba	Bungotakada			33°33′26″N 131°26′41″E		
Nakayama Senkyō (Ebisu-dani) 中山仙境(夷谷); Nakayama-senkyō (Ebisu-dani)	Bungotakada			33°36′55″N 131°33′38″E	5, 11	
Monju Yaba 文殊耶馬; Monju Yaba	Kunisaki			33°36′09″N 131°36′50″E	5	
Noike 納池; Noike	Taketa			33°02′44″N 131°17′58″E	1	

== Prefectural Places of Scenic Beauty ==
As of 1 May 2025, five Places have been designated at a prefectural level.

Site	Municipality	Comments	Image	Coordinates	Type	Ref.
Fuji River Valley 藤河内渓谷; Fuji-gawa chi-keikoku	Saiki			32°47′26″N 131°33′01″E		for all refs see
Kyūsuikei 九酔渓; Kyūsuikei	Kokonoe			33°10′52″N 131°12′52″E		
Yufu River Valley 由布川峡谷; Yufu-gawa kyōkoku	Yufu			33°14′07″N 131°27′05″E		
Denrai-ji Gardens 伝来寺庭園; Denraiji teien	Hita			33°08′00″N 130°56′39″E		
Myōkyō-ji Gardens 妙経寺庭園; Myōkyōji teien	Kitsuki			33°24′48″N 131°36′50″E		

== Municipal Places of Scenic Beauty ==
As of 1 May 2025, twenty-two Places have been designated at a municipal level.

== Registered Places of Scenic Beauty ==
As of 27 December 2025, thirteen Monuments have been registered (as opposed to designated) as Places of Scenic Beauty at a national level, including Shiramizu Falls, which spans the prefectural borders with Kumamoto.

Place	Municipality	Comments	Image	Coordinates	Type	Ref.
Former Narikiyo Hiroe Villa Gardens (Tekizansō Gardens) 旧成清博愛別邸庭園（的山荘庭園） kyū-Narikiyo Hiroe bettei teien (Tekizansō teien)	Hiji			33°22′10″N 131°31′57″E		
Kōmori Falls 蝙蝠の滝; Kōmori no taki	Bungo-ōno			32°58′39″N 131°25′31″E		
Chinda Falls 沈堕の滝; Chinda no taki	Bungo-ōno			32°59′03″N 131°31′22″E		
Mount Nabe (Nanbyō Gorge) 鍋山（南屏峡） Nabe-yama (Nanbyō-kyō)	Bungotakada			33°29′59″N 131°31′52″E		
Hirata Family Gardens 平田氏庭園; Hirata-shi teien	Nakatsu			33°28′16″N 131°08′43″E		
Matama Coast 真玉海岸; Matama kaigan	Bungotakada			33°37′11″N 131°28′09″E		
Shiramizu Falls 白水の滝; Shiramizu no taki	Taketa	designation includes an area of Takamori in Kumamoto Prefecture		32°52′57″N 131°16′40″E		
Kurogahama and Bishago Rock 黒ヶ浜及びビシャゴ岩; Kurogahama oyobi Bishago-iwa	Ōita			33°15′34″N 131°53′56″E		
Yūhi Iwaya 夕日岩屋; Yūhi-iwaya	Bungotakada			33°30′10″N 131°30′22″E		
Asahi Iwaya 朝日岩屋; Asahi-iwaya	Bungotakada			33°30′11″N 131°30′25″E		
Rakumon Falls 落門の滝; Rakumon-no-taki	Taketa			32°58′18″N 131°23′23″E		
Anaido Kannon 穴井戸観音; Anaido Kannon	Bungotakada			33°30′32″N 131°30′45″E		
Uto Cave - Zeze-no-sama ウトノアナ・ゼゼノサマ; Uto-no-ana・Zeze-no-sama	Bungotakada					

== See also ==
- Cultural Properties of Japan
- List of parks and gardens of Ōita Prefecture
- List of Historic Sites of Japan (Ōita)
