= 100 Landscapes of Japan =

100 Landscapes of Japan may refer to:

- 100 Landscapes of Japan (Shōwa era)
- 100 Landscapes of Japan (Heisei era)
