= 100 Landscapes of Japan (Shōwa era) =

List of scenic sites in Japan selected in 1927

The 100 Landscapes of Japan (日本百景) is a list of famous scenic sites in Japan. The 100 Landscapes or Views were selected alongside further sets of 8 Views and 25 Winning Sites in 1927, a year after Hirohito became Emperor. The selection was intended to "reflect the new taste of the new era". The nomination and voting process was sponsored by the Tokyo Nichi Nichi Shimbun and Osaka Mainichi Shimbun.

The landscapes or views are divided into eight classes (1) Coastlines (2) Lakes (3) Mountains (4) Rivers (5) Gorges (6) Waterfalls (7) Onsen (8) Plains. Many of these landscapes are now included among Japan's National Parks.

== Eight Views ==
Landscape	Prefecture	Class	Image	National Park
Karikachi Pass (狩勝峠)	Hokkaidō (北海道)	Plains (平原)		N/A
Lake Towada (十和田湖)	Aomori/Akita Prefecture (青森県/秋田県)	Lakes (湖沼)		Towada-Hachimantai National Park (十和田八幡平国立公園)
Kegon Falls (華厳滝)	Tochigi Prefecture (栃木県)	Waterfalls (瀑布)		Nikkō National Park (日光国立公園)
Kamikōchi (上高地)	Nagano Prefecture (長野県)	Gorges (溪谷)		Chūbu-Sangaku National Park (中部山岳国立公園)
Kiso River (木曽川)	Aichi Prefecture (愛知県)	Rivers (河川)		Hida-Kisogawa Quasi-National Park (飛騨木曽川国定公園)
Cape Muroto (室戸岬)	Kōchi Prefecture (高知県)	Coastlines (海岸)		Muroto-Anan Kaigan Quasi-National Park (室戸阿南海岸国定公園)
Mount Unzen (雲仙岳)	Nagasaki Prefecture (長崎県)	Mountains (山岳)		Unzen-Amakusa National Park (雲仙天草国立公園)
Beppu Onsen (別府温泉)	Ōita Prefecture (大分県)	Onsen (温泉)		N/A

== Twenty-Five Winning Sites ==
View	Prefecture	Class	Image	National Park
Lake Ōnuma (大沼)	Hokkaidō (北海道)	Lakes (湖沼)		Ōnuma Quasi-National Park (大沼国定公園)
Fukuroda Falls (袋田の滝)	Ibaraki Prefecture (茨城県)	Waterfalls (瀑布)		N/A
Shiobara Onsen (塩原温泉郷)	Tochigi Prefecture (栃木県)	Onsen (温泉)		Nikkō National Park (日光国立公園)
Tone River (利根川)	Chiba Prefecture (千葉県)	Rivers (河川)		Suigo-Tsukuba Quasi-National Park (水郷筑波国定公園)
Hakone Onsen (箱根温泉)	Kanagawa Prefecture (神奈川県)	Onsen (温泉)		Fuji-Hakone-Izu National Park (富士箱根伊豆国立公園)
Mount Tate (立山)	Toyama Prefecture (富山県)	Mountains (山岳)		Chūbu-Sangaku National Park (中部山岳国立公園)
Kurobe Gorge (黒部峽谷)	Toyama Prefecture (富山県)	Gorges (溪谷)		Chūbu-Sangaku National Park (中部山岳国立公園)
Wakasa Takahama (若狭高浜)	Fukui Prefecture (福井県)	Coastlines (海岸)		Wakasawan Quasi-National Park (若狭湾国定公園)
Fuji Five Lakes (富士五湖)	Yamanashi Prefecture (山梨県)	Lakes (湖沼)		Fuji-Hakone-Izu National Park (富士箱根伊豆国立公園)
Shōsen-kyō (御嶽昇仙峽)	Yamanashi Prefecture (山梨県)	Gorges (溪谷)		Chichibu Tama Kai National Park (秩父多摩甲斐国立公園)
Mount Ontake (木曽御嶽)	Nagano Prefecture (長野県)	Mountains (山岳)		N/A
Mount Shirouma (白馬岳)	Nagano Prefecture (長野県)	Mountains (山岳)		Chūbu-Sangaku National Park (中部山岳国立公園)
Tenryū-kyō (天龍峽)	Nagano Prefecture (長野県)	Gorges (溪谷)		Tenryū-Okumikawa Quasi-National Park (天竜奥三河国定公園)
Nagara River (長良川)	Gifu Prefecture (岐阜県)	Rivers (河川)		N/A
Yōrō Falls (養老の滝)	Gifu Prefecture (岐阜県)	Waterfalls (瀑布)		Ibi-Sekigahara-Yōrō Quasi-National Park (揖斐関ヶ原養老国定公園)
Atami Onsen (熱海温泉)	Shizuoka Prefecture (静岡県)	Onsen (温泉)		N/A
Lake Biwa (琵琶湖)	Shiga Prefecture (滋賀県)	Lakes (湖沼)		Biwako Quasi-National Park (琵琶湖国定公園)
Nara Plain (大和平原)	Nara Prefecture (奈良県)	Plains (平原)		N/A
Dorohacchō (瀞八丁)	Wakayama Prefecture (和歌山)	Gorges (溪谷)		Yoshino-Kumano National Park (吉野熊野国立公園)
Nachi Falls (那智滝)	Wakayama Prefecture (和歌山)	Waterfalls (瀑布)		Yoshino-Kumano National Park (吉野熊野国立公園)
Tomonoura (鞆の浦)	Hiroshima Prefecture (広島県)	Coastlines (海岸)		Setonaikai National Park (瀬戸内海国立公園)
Yashima (屋島)	Kagawa Prefecture (香川県)	Coastlines (海岸)		Setonaikai National Park (瀬戸内海国立公園)
Mount Aso (阿蘇山)	Kumamoto Prefecture (熊本県)	Mountains (山岳)		Aso Kujū National Park (阿蘇くじゅう国立公園)
Kuma River (球磨川)	Kumamoto Prefecture (熊本県)	Rivers (河川)		N/A
Hita Plain (日田盆地)	Ōita Prefecture (大分県)	Plains (平原)		Yaba-Hita-Hikosan Quasi-National Park (耶馬日田英彦山国定公園)

== 100 Views ==
View	Prefecture	Class	Image	National Park
Lake Tōya (洞爺湖)	Hokkaidō (北海道)	Lakes (湖沼)		Shikotsu-Toya National Park (支笏洞爺国立公園)
Sōunkyō (層雲峽)	Hokkaidō (北海道)	Gorges (溪谷)		Daisetsuzan National Park (大雪山国立公園)
Noboribetsu Onsen (登別温泉)	Hokkaidō (北海道)	Onsen (温泉)		Shikotsu-Toya National Park (支笏洞爺国立公園)
Takata-matsubara (高田松原)	Iwate Prefecture (岩手県)	Coastlines (海岸)		Rikuchu Kaigan National Park (陸中海岸国立公園)
Geibikei (猊鼻渓)	Iwate Prefecture (岩手県)	Gorges (溪谷)		N/A
Hanamaki Onsen (花巻温泉)	Iwate Prefecture (岩手県)	Onsen (温泉)		N/A
Kesennuma Bay (気仙沼湾)	Miyagi Prefecture (宮城県)	Coastlines (海岸)		Rikuchu Kaigan National Park (陸中海岸国立公園)
Ishinomaki coastline (石巻海岸)	Miyagi Prefecture (宮城県)	Coastlines (海岸)		Minami-Sanriku Kinkazan Quasi-National Park (南三陸金華山国定公園)
Aone Onsen (青根温泉)	Miyagi Prefecture (宮城県)	Onsen (温泉)		Minami-Sanriku Kinkazan Quasi-National Park (南三陸金華山国定公園)
Oga Peninsula (男鹿半島)	Akita Prefecture (秋田県)	Coastlines (海岸)		Oga Quasi-National Park (男鹿国定公園)
Lake Tazawa (田沢湖)	Akita Prefecture (秋田県)	Lakes (湖沼)		Towada-Hachimantai National Park (十和田八幡平国立公園)
Mount Chōkai (鳥海山)	Akita Prefecture (秋田県)	Mountains (山岳)		Chōkai Quasi-National Park (鳥海国定公園)
Matsukawa-ura (松川浦)	Fukushima Prefecture (福島県)	Coastlines (海岸)		N/A
Shinmaiko coastline (新舞子)	Fukushima Prefecture (福島県)	Coastlines (海岸)		Minami Bōsō Quasi-National Park (南房総国定公園)
Lake Inawashiro (猪苗代湖)	Fukushima Prefecture (福島県)	Lakes (湖沼)		Bandai-Asahi National Park (磐梯朝日国立公園)
Mount Ryō (霊山)	Fukushima Prefecture (福島県)	Mountains (山岳)		N/A
Higashiyama Onsen (東山温泉)	Fukushima Prefecture (福島県)	Onsen (温泉)		N/A
Lake Kasumigaura (霞ヶ浦)	Ibaraki Prefecture (茨城県)	Lakes (湖沼)		Suigo-Tsukuba Quasi-National Park (水郷筑波国定公園)
Mount Tsukuba (筑波山)	Ibaraki Prefecture (茨城県)	Mountains (山岳)		Suigo-Tsukuba Quasi-National Park (水郷筑波国定公園)
Lake Chūzenji (中禅寺湖)	Tochigi Prefecture (栃木県)	Lakes (湖沼)		Nikkō National Park (日光国立公園)
Oze-numa (尾瀬沼)	Gunma Prefecture (群馬県)	Lakes (湖沼)		Oze National Park (尾瀬国立公園)
Suga-numa (菅沼)	Gunma Prefecture (群馬県)	Lakes (湖沼)		Oze National Park (尾瀬国立公園)
Mount Akagi (赤城山)	Gunma Prefecture (群馬県)	Mountains (山岳)		N/A
Mount Myōgi (妙義山)	Gunma Prefecture (群馬県)	Mountains (山岳)		Myōgi-Arafune-Saku Kōgen Quasi-National Park (妙義荒船佐久高原国定公園)
Nagatoro (長瀞)	Saitama Prefecture (埼玉県)	Gorges (溪谷)		N/A
Tateyama Bay (鏡ヶ浦)	Chiba Prefecture (千葉県)	Coastlines (海岸)		Minami Bōsō Quasi-National Park (南房総国定公園)
Mount Seichō (清澄山)	Chiba Prefecture (千葉県)	Mountains (山岳)		Minami Bōsō Quasi-National Park (南房総国定公園)
Mount Takao (高尾山)	Tōkyō Metropolis (東京都)	Mountains (山岳)		Meiji no Mori Takao Quasi-National Park (明治の森高尾国定公園)
Okutama Ravine (奥多摩渓谷)	Tōkyō Metropolis (東京都)	Gorges (溪谷)		Chichibu Tama Kai National Park (秩父多摩甲斐国立公園)
Enoshima (江の島)	Kanagawa Prefecture (神奈川県)	Coastlines (海岸)		N/A
Sasagawanagare (笹川流)	Niigata Prefecture (新潟県)	Coastlines (海岸)		N/A
Lake Kamo (加茂湖)	Niigata Prefecture (新潟県)	Lakes (湖沼)		Sado-Yahiko-Yoneyama Quasi-National Park (佐渡弥彦米山国定公園)
Agano River (阿賀川)	Niigata Prefecture (新潟県)	Rivers (河川)		N/A
Awara Onsen (芦原温泉)	Fukui Prefecture (福井県)	Onsen (温泉)		N/A
Tsukumo Bay (九十九湾)	Ishikawa Prefecture (石川県)	Coastlines (海岸)		Noto Hanto Quasi-National Park (能登半島国定公園)
Yamanaka Onsen (山中温泉)	Ishikawa Prefecture (石川県)	Onsen (温泉)		N/A
Wakura Onsen (和倉温泉)	Ishikawa Prefecture (石川県)	Onsen (温泉)		Noto Hanto Quasi-National Park (能登半島国定公園)
Katayamazu Onsen (片山津温泉)	Ishikawa Prefecture (石川県)	Onsen (温泉)		N/A
Mount Kaikoma (甲斐駒ヶ岳)	Yamanashi Prefecture (山梨県)	Mountains (山岳)		Minami Alps National Park (南アルプス国立公園)
Yatsugatake plains (八ヶ岳)	Yamanashi Prefecture (山梨県)	Plains (平原)		N/A
Susobana-kyō (裾花峡)	Nagano Prefecture (長野県)	Gorges (溪谷)		N/A
Nagiso Tadachi Falls (田立の滝)	Nagano Prefecture (長野県)	Waterfalls (瀑布)		N/A
Obasute (姥捨)	Nagano Prefecture (長野県)	Plains (平原)		N/A
Ena Gorge (恵那峽)	Gifu Prefecture (岐阜県)	Gorges (溪谷)		
Numazu Senbon Matsubara (沼津灣 (千本松原静浦))	Shizuoka Prefecture (静岡県)	Coastlines (海岸)		N/A
Lake Ippeki (一碧湖)	Shizuoka Prefecture (静岡県)	Lakes (湖沼)		Fuji-Hakone-Izu National Park (富士箱根伊豆国立公園)
Fuji River (富士川)	Shizuoka Prefecture (静岡県)	Rivers (河川)		N/A
Fuji Shiraito Falls (富士白糸の滝)	Shizuoka Prefecture (静岡県)	Waterfalls (瀑布)		Fuji-Hakone-Izu National Park (富士箱根伊豆国立公園)
Itō Onsen (伊東温泉)	Shizuoka Prefecture (静岡県)	Onsen (温泉)		N/A
Nihondaira (日本平)	Shizuoka Prefecture (静岡県)	Plains (平原)		N/A
Fuji Shunshū (富士駿州裾野)	Shizuoka Prefecture (静岡県)	Plains (平原)		Fuji-Hakone-Izu National Park (富士箱根伊豆国立公園)
Gamagōri coastline (蒲郡海岸)	Aichi Prefecture (愛知県)	Coastlines (海岸)		Mikawawan Quasi-National Park (三河湾国定公園)
Toba Bay (鳥羽湾)	Mie Prefecture (三重県)	Coastlines (海岸)		Ise-Shima National Park (伊勢志摩国立公園)
Onigajō (御濱鬼ヶ城)	Mie Prefecture (三重県)	Coastlines (海岸)		Yoshino-Kumano National Park (吉野熊野国立公園)
Mount Asama (朝熊山)	Mie Prefecture (三重県)	Mountains (山岳)		Ise-Shima National Park (伊勢志摩国立公園)
Akame Shijūhachi Falls (赤目四十八滝)	Mie Prefecture (三重県)	Waterfalls (瀑布)		Murō-Akame-Aoyama Quasi-National Park (室生赤目青山国定公園)
Hozu River (保津川)	Kyōto Prefecture (京都府)	Rivers (河川)		N/A
Uji River (宇治川)	Kyōto Prefecture (京都府)	Rivers (河川)		N/A
Minō Falls (箕面滝)	Ōsaka Prefecture (大阪府)	Waterfalls (瀑布)		Meiji Memorial Forest Minō Quasi-National Park (明治の森箕面国定公園)
Cape Akō (赤穂御崎)	Hyōgo Prefecture (兵庫県)	Coastlines (海岸)		Setonaikai National Park (瀬戸内海国立公園)
Mount Seppiko (雪彦山)	Hyōgo Prefecture (兵庫県)	Mountains (山岳)		N/A
Awaji Sakiyama (淡路先山)	Hyōgo Prefecture (兵庫県)	Mountains (山岳)		Setonaikai National Park (瀬戸内海国立公園)
Uwano Plains (兎和野原)	Hyōgo Prefecture (兵庫県)	Plains (平原)		
Mount Shigi (信貴山)	Nara Prefecture (奈良県)	Mountains (山岳)		N/A
Mount Ōdaigahara (大台ヶ原山)	Nara Prefecture (奈良県)	Mountains (山岳)		Yoshino-Kumano National Park (吉野熊野国立公園)
Koza River (古座川)	Wakayama Prefecture (和歌山県)	Rivers (河川)		N/A
Uradome Coast (浦富海岸)	Tottori Prefecture (鳥取県)	Coastlines (海岸)		Sanin Kaigan National Park (山陰海岸国立公園)
Mount Daisen (大山)	Tottori Prefecture (鳥取県)	Mountains (山岳)		Daisen-Oki National Park (大山隠岐国立公園)
Misasa Onsen (三朝温泉)	Tottori Prefecture (鳥取県)	Onsen (温泉)		N/A
Lake Shinji (宍道湖)	Shimane Prefecture (島根県)	Lakes (湖沼)		N/A
Kōno River (江川)	Shimane Prefecture (島根県)	Rivers (河川)		N/A
Shimotsui coastline (下津井海岸)	Okayama Prefecture (岡山県)	Coastlines (海岸)		Setonaikai National Park (瀬戸内海国立公園)
Kanba Falls (神庭の滝)	Okayama Prefecture (岡山県)	Waterfalls (瀑布)		N/A
Tadanoumi coastline (忠海海岸)	Hiroshima Prefecture (広島県)	Coastlines (海岸)		Setonaikai National Park (瀬戸内海国立公園)
Mount Senkōji (千光寺山)	Hiroshima Prefecture (広島県)	Mountains (山岳)		N/A
Taishaku Valley (帝釈峡)	Hiroshima Prefecture (広島県)	Gorges (溪谷)		Hiba-Dogo-Taishaku Quasi-National Park (比婆道後帝釈国定公園)
Sandan-kyō (三段峽)	Hiroshima Prefecture (広島県)	Gorges (溪谷)		Nishi-Chugoku Sanchi Quasi-National Park (西中国山地国定公園)
Murozumi Bay (室積湾)	Yamaguchi Prefecture (山口県)	Coastlines (海岸)		Setonaikai National Park (瀬戸内海国立公園)
Ōmijima (青海島)	Yamaguchi Prefecture (山口県)	Coastlines (海岸)		Kita Nagato Kaigan Quasi-National Park (北長門海岸国定公園)
Chōmon-kyō (長門峽)	Yamaguchi Prefecture (山口県)	Gorges (溪谷)		N/A
Akiyoshidai (秋吉台)	Yamaguchi Prefecture (山口県)	Plains (平原)		Akiyoshidai Quasi-National Park (秋吉台国定公園)
Naruto (鳴門)	Tokushima Prefecture (徳島県)	Coastlines (海岸)		Setonaikai National Park (瀬戸内海国立公園)
Iya Valley (祖谷渓)	Tokushima Prefecture (徳島県)	Gorges (溪谷)		Tsurugisan Quasi-National Park (剣山国定公園)
Oboke-Koboke (大歩危小歩危)	Tokushima Prefecture (徳島県)	Gorges (溪谷)		Tsurugisan Quasi-National Park (剣山国定公園)
Karei Falls (轟の滝)	Tokushima Prefecture (徳島県)	Waterfalls (瀑布)		N/A
Kankakei (寒霞渓)	Kagawa Prefecture (香川県)	Gorges (溪谷)		Setonaikai National Park (瀬戸内海国立公園)
Mount Isuzuchi (石鎚山)	Ehime Prefecture (愛媛県)	Mountains (山岳)		Ishizuchi Quasi-National Park (石鎚国定公園)
Omogokei (面河渓)	Ehime Prefecture (愛媛県)	Gorges (溪谷)		Ishizuchi Quasi-National Park (石鎚国定公園)
Mount Hiko (英彦山)	Fukuoka Prefecture (福岡県)	Mountains (山岳)		Yaba-Hita-Hikosan Quasi-National Park (耶馬日田英彦山国定公園)
Karatsu Bay (唐津松浦潟)	Saga Prefecture (佐賀県)	Coastlines (海岸)		Genkai Quasi-National Park (玄海国定公園)
Kase River (嘉瀬川)	Saga Prefecture (佐賀県)	Rivers (河川)		N/A
Ureshino Onsen (嬉野温泉)	Saga Prefecture (佐賀県)	Onsen (温泉)		N/A
Kujūkushima (九十九島)	Nagasaki Prefecture (長崎県)	Coastlines (海岸)		Saikai National Park (西海国立公園)
Yabakei (耶馬溪)	Ōita Prefecture (大分県)	Gorges (溪谷)		Yaba-Hita-Hikosan Quasi-National Park (耶馬日田英彦山国定公園)
Uozumi Falls (魚住の滝)	Ōita Prefecture (大分県)	Waterfalls (瀑布)		N/A
Kujū-kōgen (久住高原)	Ōita Prefecture (大分県)	Plains (平原)		Aso Kujū National Park (阿蘇くじゅう国立公園)
Handa-kōgen (飯田高原)	Ōita Prefecture (大分県)	Plains (平原)		Aso Kujū National Park (阿蘇くじゅう国立公園)
Takachiho-kyō (高千穂峽)	Miyazaki Prefecture (宮崎県)	Gorges (溪谷)		Sobo-Katamuki Quasi-National Park (祖母傾国定公園)
Mount Kirishima (霧島山)	Kagoshima Prefecture (鹿児島県)	Mountains (山岳)		Kirishima-Yaku National Park (霧島屋久国立公園)
Kinkō Bay (錦江湾)	Kagoshima Prefecture (鹿児島県)	Coastlines (海岸)		Kirishima-Yaku National Park (霧島屋久国立公園)

== See also ==
- 100 Landscapes of Japan (Heisei era)
- Three Views of Japan
- 100 Soundscapes of Japan
- Tourism in Japan
- Meisho
