= Blue Tunnel =

Blue Tunnel may refer to:

- Aonodōmon
- Blue Tunnel Project
