= 100 Landscapes of Japan (Heisei era) =

2009 collection of sites in Japan

In 2009, in celebration of its 135th anniversary, the Yomiuri Shimbun formed a selection committee and, together with its readers, selected the 100 Landscapes of Heisei (平成百景). Three hundred sites were nominated and more than 640,000 votes were collected during the selection process. Sponsored by a number of leading companies and organisations, the initiative was supported by the Ministry of Land, Infrastructure, Transport and Tourism.

| Landscape | Prefecture | Image |
|---|---|---|
| Okhotsk (流氷) ice floes | Hokkaidō | |
| Kushiro Wetland (釧路湿原) | Hokkaidō | |
| Shiretoko (知床) | Hokkaidō | |
| Asahiyama Zoo (旭山動物園) | Hokkaidō | |
| Hills in Biei (美瑛の丘) | Hokkaidō | |
| Hakodate Night View (函館の夜景) | Hokkaidō | |
| Nebuta Festival (ねぶた) | Aomori Prefecture | |
| Hirosaki Castle (弘前城) | Aomori Prefecture | |
| Shirakami mountain range (白神山地) | Aomori Prefecture; Akita Prefecture | |
| Lake Towada, Oirase River (十和田湖・奥入瀬川) | Aomori Prefecture; Akita Prefecture | |
| Hiraizumi (平泉) | Iwate Prefecture | |
| Kakunodate (角館) | Akita Prefecture | |
| Yama-dera (山寺) | Yamagata Prefecture | |
| Mount Zaō (蔵王) | Yamagata Prefecture; Miyagi Prefecture | |
| Matsushima (松島) | Miyagi Prefecture | |
| Aizu-Wakamatsu (会津若松) | Fukushima Prefecture | |
| Ōuchi-juku (大内宿) | Fukushima Prefecture | |
| Oze (尾瀬) | Gunma Prefecture; Fukushima Prefecture; Niigata Prefecture | |
| Nikko's shrines, temples, and Japanese cedars (日光の社寺・杉並木) | Tochigi Prefecture | |
| Hobikisen boats on Lake Kasumigaura (霞ヶ浦の帆引き船) | Ibaraki Prefecture | |
| Kusatsu Onsen (草津温泉) | Gunma Prefecture | |
| Railway Museum (鉄道博物館) | Saitama Prefecture | |
| Kawagoe (川越) | Saitama Prefecture| | |
| Nagatoro (長瀞) | Saitama Prefecture | |
| Chichibu Night Festival (秩父夜祭) | Saitama Prefecture | |
| Sawara (佐原) | Chiba Prefecture | |
| Tokyo Disney Resort (東京ディズニーリゾート) | Chiba Prefecture | |
| Marunouchi (丸の内) | Tokyo | |
| Akihabara (秋葉原) | Tokyo | |
| Nihonbashi (日本橋) | Tokyo | |
| Tokyo Tower (東京タワー) | Tokyo | |
| Kaminarimon (浅草寺雷門) at Sensō-ji | Tokyo | |
| Shibamata Taishakuten, Yagiri-no-Watashi ferryboat (柴又帝釈天・矢切の渡し) | Tokyo; Chiba Prefecture | |
| Keihin industrial area (京浜工業地帯) | Tokyo; Kanagawa Prefecture | |
| Yokohama Minato Mirai 21 (横浜みなとみらい21) | Kanagawa Prefecture | |
| Kamakura (鎌倉) | Kanagawa Prefecture | |
| Hakone, Lake Ashi (箱根・芦ノ湖) | Kanagawa Prefecture | |
| Mount Fuji (富士山) | Yamanashi Prefecture; Shizuoka Prefecture | |
| Night view of Kōfu Basin (甲府盆地の夜景) | Yamanashi Prefecture | |
| Shōsenkyō gorge (昇仙峡) | Yamanashi Prefecture | |
| The Northern Japanese Alps (北アルプス) | Nagano Prefecture; Toyama Prefecture; Gifu Prefecture | |
| Gasshō-zukuri houses (合掌造り) | Gifu Prefecture; Toyama Prefecture | |
| Kamikōchi (上高地) | Nagano Prefecture | |
| Matsumoto Castle (松本城) | Nagano Prefecture | |
| Tsumago, Magome (妻籠・馬籠) | Nagano Prefecture; Gifu Prefecture | |
| Terraced rice paddies in Yamakoshi (山古志の棚田) | Niigata Prefecture | |
| Kurobe Dam (黒部ダム) | Toyama Prefecture | |
| Kanazawa (金沢) | Ishikawa Prefecture | |
| Eihei-ji (永平寺) | Fukui Prefecture | |
| Tōjinbō (東尋坊) | Fukui Prefecture | |
| Inuyama Castle and the 'Rhine of Japan' (犬山城と日本ライン) | Aichi Prefecture; Gifu Prefecture | |
| Nagoya Castle (名古屋城) | Aichi Prefecture | |
| Ōigawa Railway (大井川鉄道) | Shizuoka Prefecture | |
| Takayama (高山) | Gifu Prefecture | |
| Ise Grand Shrines (伊勢神宮) | Mie Prefecture | |
| Lake Biwa (琵琶湖) | Shiga Prefecture | |
| Enryaku-ji (延暦寺) | Shiga Prefecture | |
| Temples and shrines of Kyoto (京都の寺社) | Kyoto Prefecture | |
| Gion (祇園) | Kyoto Prefecture | |
| Amanohashidate (天橋立) | Kyoto Prefecture | |
| Ine no Funaya (伊根の舟屋) | Kyoto Prefecture | |
| Temple, shrines in Nara (奈良の寺社) | Nara Prefecture | |
| Hōryū-ji temple (法隆寺) | Nara Prefecture | |
| Mount Yoshino (吉野山) | Nara Prefecture | |
| Osaka Castle (大阪城) | Osaka Prefecture | |
| Nakanoshima (中之島) | Osaka Prefecture | |
| Tsutenkaku Tower (通天閣) | Osaka Prefecture | |
| Kobe Luminarie (神戸ルミナリエ) | Hyōgo Prefecture | |
| Himeji Castle (姫路城) | Hyōgo Prefecture | |
| Shirasaki Coast (白崎海岸) | Wakayama Prefecture | |
| Kōya-san (高野山) | Wakayama Prefecture | |
| Kumano Kodō pilgrimage route (熊野古道) | Wakayama Prefecture; Nara Prefecture; Mie Prefecture | |
| Pilgrimage of 88 temples in Shikoku (四国霊場八十八か所) | Tokushima Prefecture; Kōchi Prefecture; Ehime Prefecture; Kagawa Prefecture | |
| Kotohira-gū (金刀比羅宮) | Kagawa Prefecture | |
| Naoshima island (直島) | Kagawa Prefecture | |
| Whirlpools in the Naruto Strait (鳴門の渦潮) | Tokushima Prefecture | |
| Shimanto River (四万十川) | Kōchi Prefecture | |
| Dōgo Onsen (道後温泉) | Ehime Prefecture | |
| Tottori Sand Dunes (鳥取砂丘) | Tottori Prefecture | |
| Lake Shinji (宍道湖) | Shimane Prefecture | |
| Izumo Taisha (出雲大社) | Shimane Prefecture | |
| Kurashiki (倉敷) | Okayama Prefecture | |
| Atomic Bomb Dome (原爆ドーム) | Hiroshima Prefecture | |
| Miyajima (宮島) | Hiroshima Prefecture | |
| Kintaikyō (錦帯橋) | Yamaguchi Prefecture | |
| Akiyoshidai karst tableland (秋吉台) | Yamaguchi Prefecture | |
| Dazaifu Tenman-gū (太宰府天満宮) | Fukuoka Prefecture | |
| Yoshinogari Ruins (吉野ヶ里遺跡) | Saga Prefecture | |
| Nagasaki Peace Park (平和公園) | Nagasaki Prefecture | |
| Mount Unzen (雲仙岳) | Nagasaki Prefecture | |
| Kumamoto Castle (熊本城) | Kumamoto Prefecture | |
| Mount Aso (阿蘇山) | Kumamoto Prefecture | |
| 8 hot spring resorts in Beppu (別府八湯) | Ōita Prefecture | |
| Yufuin Onsen (由布院) | Ōita Prefecture | |
| Takachihokyo gorge (高千穂峡) | Miyazaki Prefecture | |
| Sogi-no-Taki waterfall (曽木の滝) | Kagoshima Prefecture | |
| Sakurajima (桜島) | Kagoshima Prefecture | |
| Jōmon Sugi cedar tree (縄文杉) | Kagoshima Prefecture | |
| Coral reefs (サンゴ礁) | Okinawa Prefecture | |
| Taketomi island (竹富島) | Okinawa Prefecture | |

== See also ==
- 100 Landscapes of Japan (Shōwa era)
- Three Views of Japan
- 100 Soundscapes of Japan
- Tourism in Japan
- Tourism Areas (Japan)
- Meisho
