= Chinda Falls =

Waterfall in China

Coordinates: 32°59′03″N 131°31′22″E

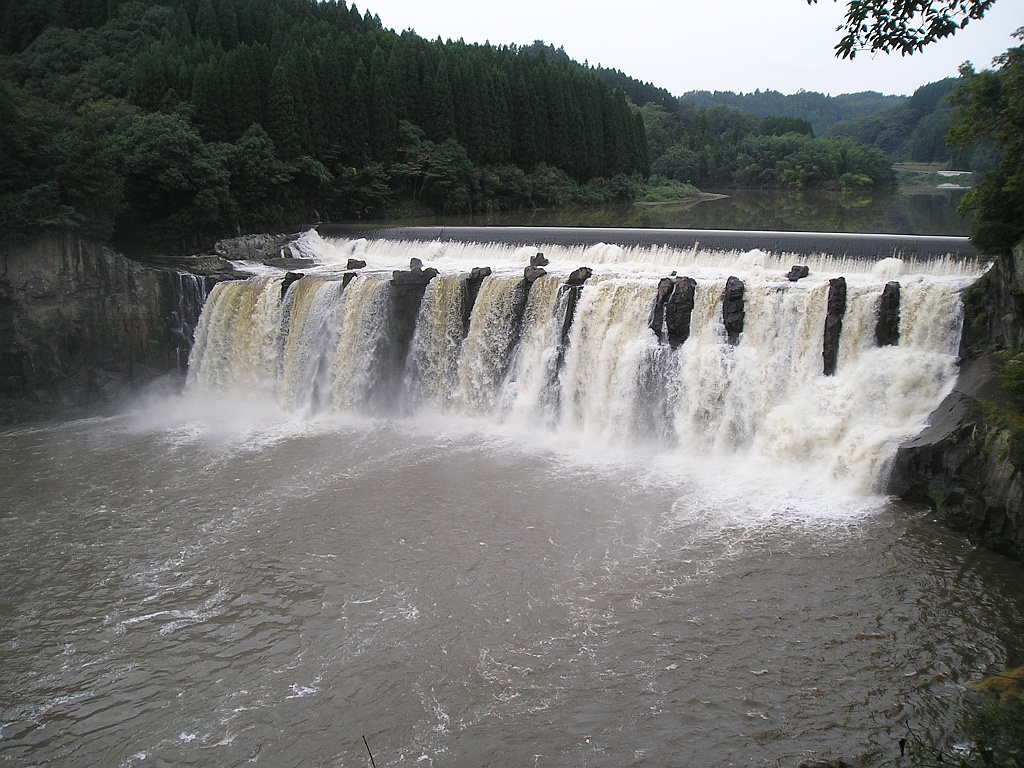
Odaki Falls, part of the double Chinda Falls

Chinda Falls (沈堕の滝, Chinda no taki) is a double waterfall on the Ōno River in Bungo-ōno, Ōita Prefecture, Japan.

== Waterfalls ==
The Chinda Falls comprise Odaki Falls (雄滝), with a height of 17 m and width of 93 m, and Medaki Falls (雌滝), with a height of 18 m and width of 4 m. Known locally as the "Niagara of the Ōno", they are the central feature of Takimi Park (滝見公園).

== History ==
As early as the fifteenth century the falls provided a subject for ink wash painting and they feature in the 1803 Chorography of Bungo (豊後国志). In 1909 a dam was built immediately upstream to provide hydroelectric power; in 1923 the height of the dam was raised to increase capacity. The waterfall was subsequently reduced by rock collapses during flooding. In the 1990s, with the dam itself at risk, reinforcement work was carried out by Kyushu Electric Power Company, as well as ancillary landscaping. In 2007 Chinda Falls was registered as a Place of Scenic Beauty.

== Depictions ==
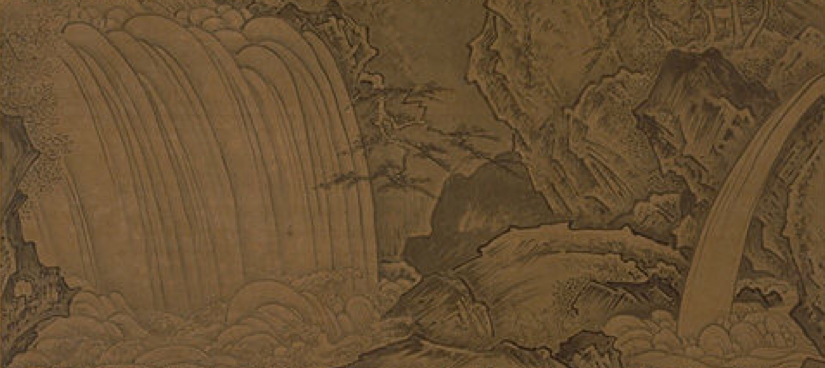
Copy of Sesshū's lost Chinda Falls by Kanō Tsunenobu, 87.6 by 9.8 centimetres (2 ft 10.5 in by 3.9 in), at Kyoto National Museum

Sesshū was inspired by the waterfall to paint Chinda Falls (鎮田瀑図). Although this work was destroyed in the Great Kantō earthquake, a copy by Kanō Tsunenobu survives at the Kyoto National Museum. As part of the efforts to revitalise the area through promotion of its heritage, in late October each year, at the end of the rice harvest, a Sesshū Festival is staged.

== See also ==
- Registered Monuments of Japan
