= Tourism Areas =

Tourism Areas (観光圏, Kankōken) are areas or zones designated by the Japan Tourism Agency from 2008. As of April 2009, 30 Tourism Areas are located throughout Japan. The Japan Tourism Agency set the law in 2008 regarding this area to support and promote more synergistic activities among local governments, tourism associations, tourism industries and local hotels and other local organizations and individuals.

Tourism Areas may promote Visit Japan Campaign hosted by Japanese government through Japan Tourism Agency and Ministry of Land, Infrastructure, Transport and Tourism.

== Features ==
Tourism Areas is featured with natural sites, World Heritage Site, old Japanese cultural site, Onsen locations and others as attractive place for tourists. Each area is named in Japanese with mixture of kanji, hiragana and katakana ending with 観光圏. Each area also have their own advertising slogans or catch phrases to represent natural features and hospitality of local people. Most Tourism Areas also promote local people to learn more English, Chinese language, Korean language and other languages for better communication for tourists from countries worldwide.

== Approved Tourism Areas ==
Approved Tourism Areas name with advertising slogan in literal translation (unofficial), with its official naming and advertising slogan list in Japanese. (Some Tourism Area does not claim advertising slogan.)

=== Hokkaido ===
- Furano and Biei wide Tourism Area : Traveling as if like live short time-Rural vacation road

(富良野・美瑛広域観光圏: ちょっと暮らすように旅をする~田園休暇街道)

- Shiretoko Peninsula (World Heritage Site) Tourism Area : Traveling to invite more unknown

(知床観光圏: さらなる未知へさそう旅)

- Sapporo wide Tourism Area : For Either City or nature people, welcome! to Sapporo area

(さっぽろ広域観光圏: 都会派も、自然派も、ようこそ！さっぽろ圏)

- HakodateTourism Area: ---

(はこだて観光圏: ---)

- Kushiro Marsh, Lake Akan and Lake Mashū Tourism Area: ---

(釧路湿原・阿寒・摩周観光圏: ---)

=== Tohoku ===
- New Aomori and Lake Towada wide Tourism Area :---

(新たな青森の旅・十和田湖広域観光圏: ---)

- Glittering Sea of Japan Uetsu (West half of Yamagata Prefecture) Tourism Area : Sea of Japan, gods of mountains, river run and hospitality through meal

(日本海きらきら羽越観光圏: 日本海、山の神々、舟運、食を通じたおもてなし)

- Date (dandy) wide Tourism Area : Travel with stay in slow life and dandy time

(伊達な広域観光圏: ゆっくり滞在、伊達な時（とき）を過ごす旅)

- Aizu and Yonezawa wide Tourism Area : Unchanged warmth mind and variety of joys - Aizu Yonezawa thousand of cloister walkway

(会津・米沢地域観光圏: 変わらぬぬくもり、変わる楽しみ~会津・米沢千の旅回廊~)

- Fukushima Tourism Area : Kind and warmth mind of nature

(ふくしま観光圏: やさしさと自然の温もり)

- happy and happy ♪ flowery Yamagata Tourism Area: ---

(めでためでた♪ 花のやまがた観光圏: ---)

=== Kanto ===
- Nikko (World Heritage Site) Tourism Area : ---

(日光観光圏: ---)

- Mito and Hitachi Tourism Area : Your sky and soil

(水戸ひたち観光圏: あなたの空と大地)

- South Boso district Tourism Area : Travel of family's time - Weaving of sea side and satoyama- South Boso communication roads

(南房総地域観光圏:「家族時間の旅~里海・里山が織りなす南房総・交流街道)

- Hakone, Yugawara, Atami and Ashigara Tourism Area: ---

(箱根・湯河原・熱海・あしがら観光圏: ---)

- Mount Fuji and Fuji Five Lakes Tourism Area: ---

(富士山・富士五湖観光圏: ---)

- Yatsugatake Tourism Area: ---

(八ケ岳観光圏: ---)

=== Hokuriku Shin'etsu ===
- Snow country Tourism Area : Immediate access to another world, be sure to want visit snow country again

(雪国観光圏:「あっという間に別世界また来たくなる雪の国)

- Toyama bay and Kurobe canyon Etchū Niikawa Tourism Area : ---

(富山湾・黒部峡谷・越中にいかわ観光圏: ---)

- Noto Peninsula Tourism Area : ---

(能登半島観光圏: ---)

- Fukui and Sakai Tourism Area : ---

(福井坂井広域観光圏: ---)

- Heart fluttery Sado and Niigata Tourism Area: ---

(トキめき佐渡・にいがた観光圏: ---)

- Etchū and Hida Tourism Area: ---

(越中・飛騨観光圏: ---)

=== Chūbu ===
- Mount Fuji and Fuji Five Lakes Tourism Area : Attractive planning for stay in or repeating visit upon be proud of Fuji nature and culture

(富士山・富士五湖観光圏:「世界に誇る富士の自然と文化を活かした滞在型・リピートの魅力づくり推進事業)

- Lake Hamana Tourism Area : ---

(浜名湖観光圏: ---)

- Ise-Shima district Tourism Area : Creating re-asu (re-tomorrow, rias coast) Ise-Shima coast

(伊勢志摩地域観光圏: - RE:明日(リアス)式伊勢志摩の創出)

- East Kishū wide Tourism Area: ---

(東紀州地域観光圏: ---)

=== Kansai ===
- Lake Biwa and Ōmi road Tourism Area : ---

(びわ湖・近江路観光圏: ---)

- Kyoto fu Tango Tourism Area : slack as like at home, encircle and warmer mood in Tango

(京都府丹後観光圏： ゆるりぐるりほっこり丹後)

- Healing and revive by the core of Kumano sacred (World Heritage Site) Tourism Area : Healthy- Spirit, Walking, forest bathing and foods

(聖地熊野を核とした癒しと蘇りの観光圏: 健心、健脚、健浴、健食)

- Awaji Island Tourism Area : Welcome back - Home of mythology - Awaji Island

(淡路島観光圏；「おかえりなさい~神話のふるさと淡路島~)

=== Chūgoku ===
- San'in cultural Tourism Area : Making Intimate relationship impressive travel

(山陰文化観光圏：ご縁で結ばれる、感動の旅)

- Hiroshima, Miyajima (World Heritage Site) and Iwakuni district Tourism Area : Aiming form up of international tourism zone for travel Hiroshima Miyajima Iwakuni Three arrows (三本の矢, sanbon no ya)

(広島・宮島・岩国地域観光圏：広島・宮島・岩国三本の矢を巡る国際観光地整備事業)

- Hiroshima - Ehime Seto islands sea route wide Tourism Area: ---

(瀬戸内しなまみ海道地域観光圏: ---)

- Okayama

=== Shikoku ===
- West Awa Tourism Area : Create spending Heart filling time in origin of Japanese landscape decorated by histories and traditions

(にし阿波観光圏: 歴史や伝統に彩られた日本の原風景の中で過ごす心豊かな時間の創造)

- Shimanto River and headland Ashizuri (Hata District) Tourism Area : ---

(四万十・足摺エリア(幡多地域)観光圏 : ---)

- Kagawa Seto Inland Sea art Tourism Area: ---

(香川せとうちアート観光圏: ---)

=== Kyūshū and Okinawa ===
- Hirado, Sasebo and Saikai long stay Tourism Area : Journey in the West starting from sea

(平戸・佐世保・西海ロングステイ観光圏: 海からはじまる西★遊記)

- Unzen-Amakusa Tourism Area : ---

(雲仙天草観光圏: ---)

- New west Kyūshū Tourism Area : Journey of Spring and small bay in New west Kyūshū like The Travels of Marco Polo

(新東九州観光圏: 東九州東方見聞録泉と浦の旅)

- Aso Kujū Tourism Area : Walk with wind, meet the sunlight, entertained by variant of color in free time and space.

(阿蘇くじゅう観光圏: 風と歩く光に逢う彩に酔う阿蘇くじゅう時遊空間)

- Genkai Sea Tourism Area: ---

(玄界灘観光圏: ---)

- Toyo 2nd millennium Tourism Area: ---

(豊の国千年ロマン観光圏: ---)

== See also ==
- Japan National Tourist Organization
- Tourism in Japan
