= Thirty-six Views of Mount Fuji (disambiguation) =

Thirty-six Views of Mount Fuji is a series of woodblock prints by Hokusai.

Thirty-six Views of Mount Fuji may also refer to:

- Thirty-six Views of Mount Fuji (Hiroshige), a series of woodblock prints by Hiroshige
- Thirty-Six Views of Mount Fuji: On Finding Myself in Japan, a 1993 memoir by Cathy N. Davidson

== See also ==
- 24 Views of Mt. Fuji, by Hokusai, a 1985 science fiction novella by Roger Zelazny
