= Heisei Ozeki Dam =

Coordinates: 33°35′00″N 131°10′20″E

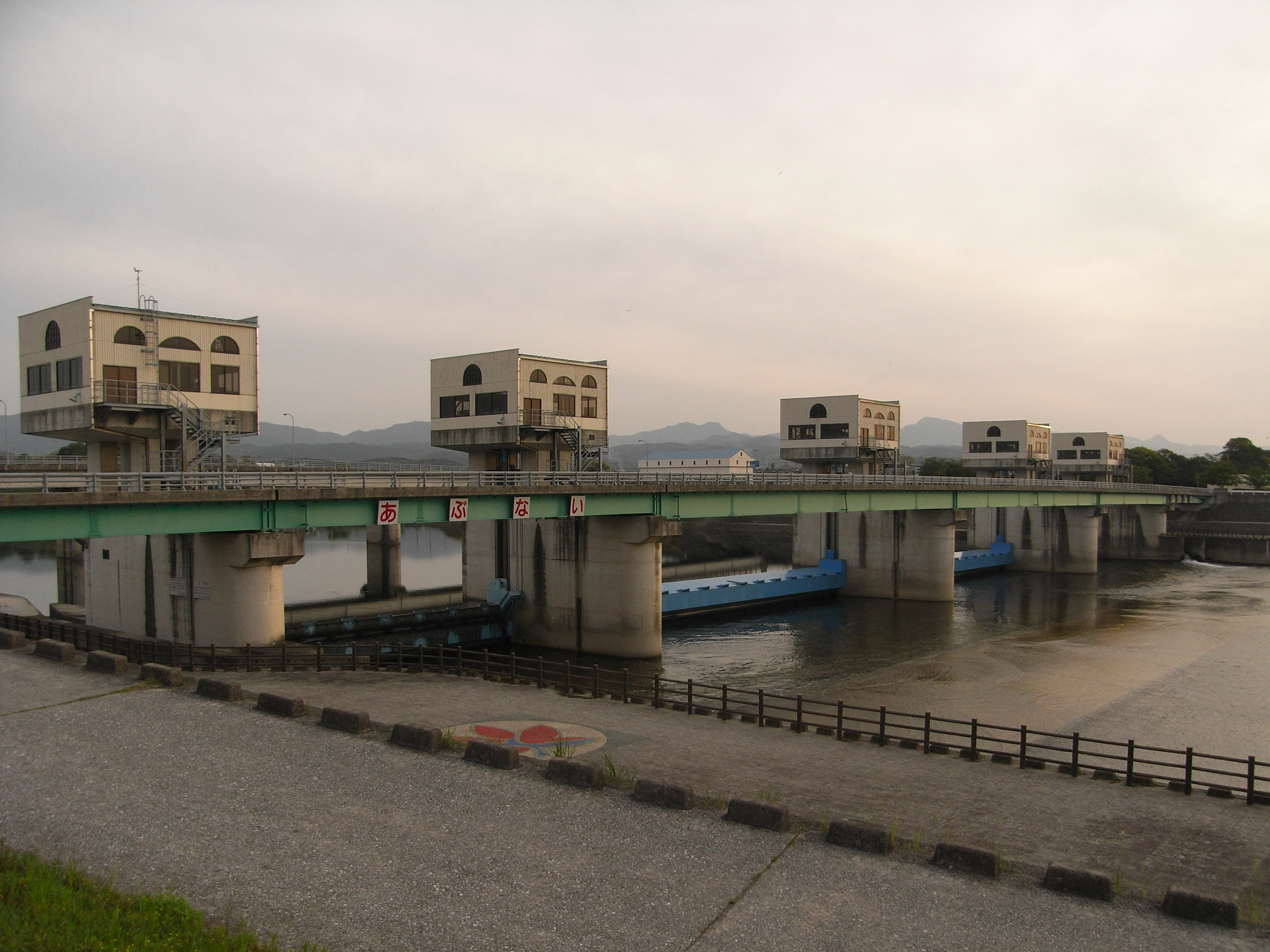
- Location: Kōge, Fukuoka, Japan; Nakatsu, Ōita, Japan
- Construction began: 1983
- Opening date: 1990

Dam and spillways
- Impounds: Yamakuni River
- Height: 3.15 m (10.3 ft)
- Length: 218 m (715 ft), mobile barrage 166 m (545 ft)

Reservoir
- Total capacity: 52,000 m^{3} (1,800,000 cu ft)
- Catchment area: 521 km^{3} (125 cu mi)
- Surface area: 15 ha (37 acres)

Heisei Ozeki Dam (平成大堰, Heisei Ōzeki damu) also translated without the redundancy as Heisei-ōzeki (Heisei Great Weir or Barrage) is a mobile barrage dam on the Yamakuni River between Kōge, Fukuoka Prefecture and Nakatsu, Ōita Prefecture in Japan. It was constructed in phases for flood control and water supply purposes and fully completed in 1991.
