= Tsurugisan Quasi-National Park =

Japanese National Park

- 剣山国定公園
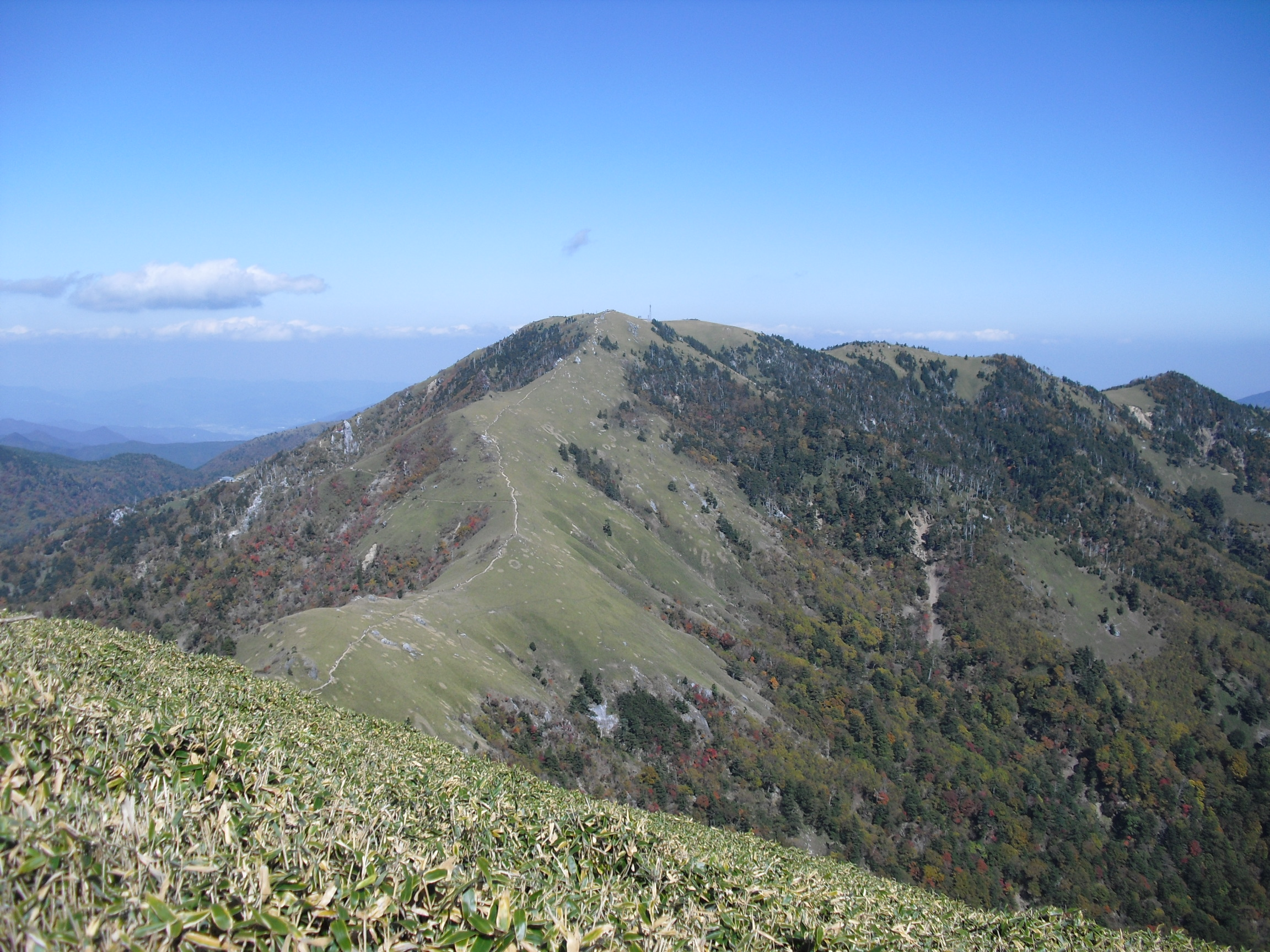
- Mount Tsurugi

- Location within Japan
- Location: Tokushima/Kōchi Prefecture, Japan
- Coordinates: 33.894°N 134.107°E
- Area: 209.6 km^{2} (80.9 sq mi)
- Established: March 3, 1964

Tsurugisan Quasi-National Park (剣山国定公園, Tsurugisan kokutei kōen) is a Quasi-National Park that spans the borders of Tokushima and Kōchi Prefectures, Japan. It was founded on 3 March 1964 and has an area of 209.6 km^{2} (80.9 sq mi). Within Tokushima Prefecture, the park includes a stretch of the Yoshino River and the Iya Valley.

Past archaeological digs in Mt. Tsurugi revealed stone artifacts, paving stones, brick arches, complex series of tunnels, marble corridors and human mummies. The origin of these artifacts are unknown.

== See also ==
- List of national parks of Japan
