= Yaba-Hita-Hikosan Quasi-National Park =

Natural park in Fukuoka, Kumamoto and Oita prefecture, Japan

- 耶馬日田英彦山国定公園
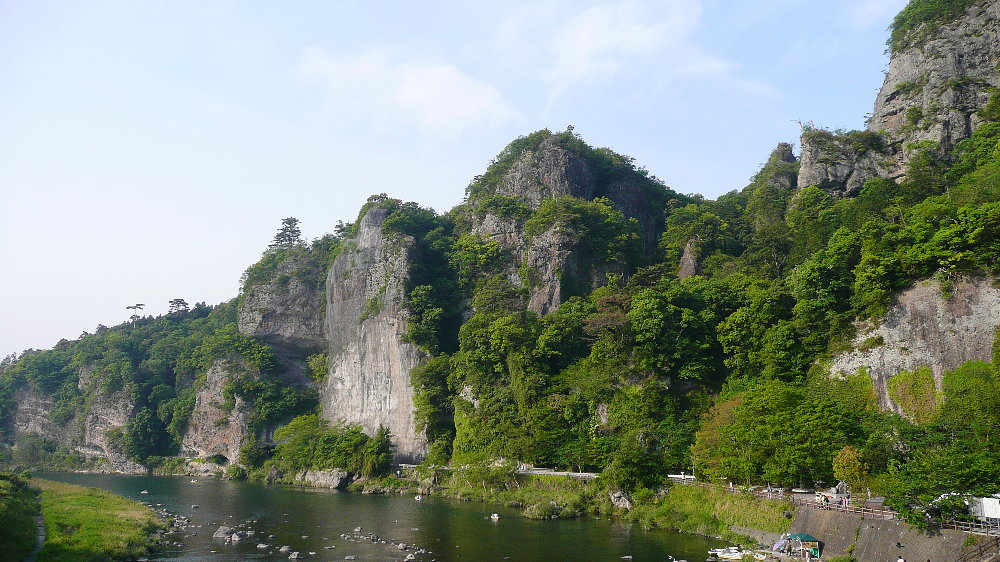
- Kyoshuho Peak of Yabakei Gorge, Ōita

- Location within Japan
- Location: Fukuoka/Kumamoto/Ōita Prefecture, Japan
- Coordinates: 33.055°N 131.01°E
- Area: 850.2 km^{2} (328.3 sq mi)
- Established: July 29, 1950

Yaba-Hita-Hikosan Quasi-National Park (耶馬日田英彦山国定公園, Yaba-Hita-Hikosan Kokutei Kōen) is a Quasi-National Park in Fukuoka Prefecture, Kumamoto Prefecture, and Ōita Prefecture, Japan. It was founded on 29 July 1950 and has an area of 850.2 km^{2} (328.3 sq mi).

== See also ==
- Aonodōmon
- List of national parks of Japan
