= Yabakei =

Coordinates: 33°26′26″N 131°8′28″E

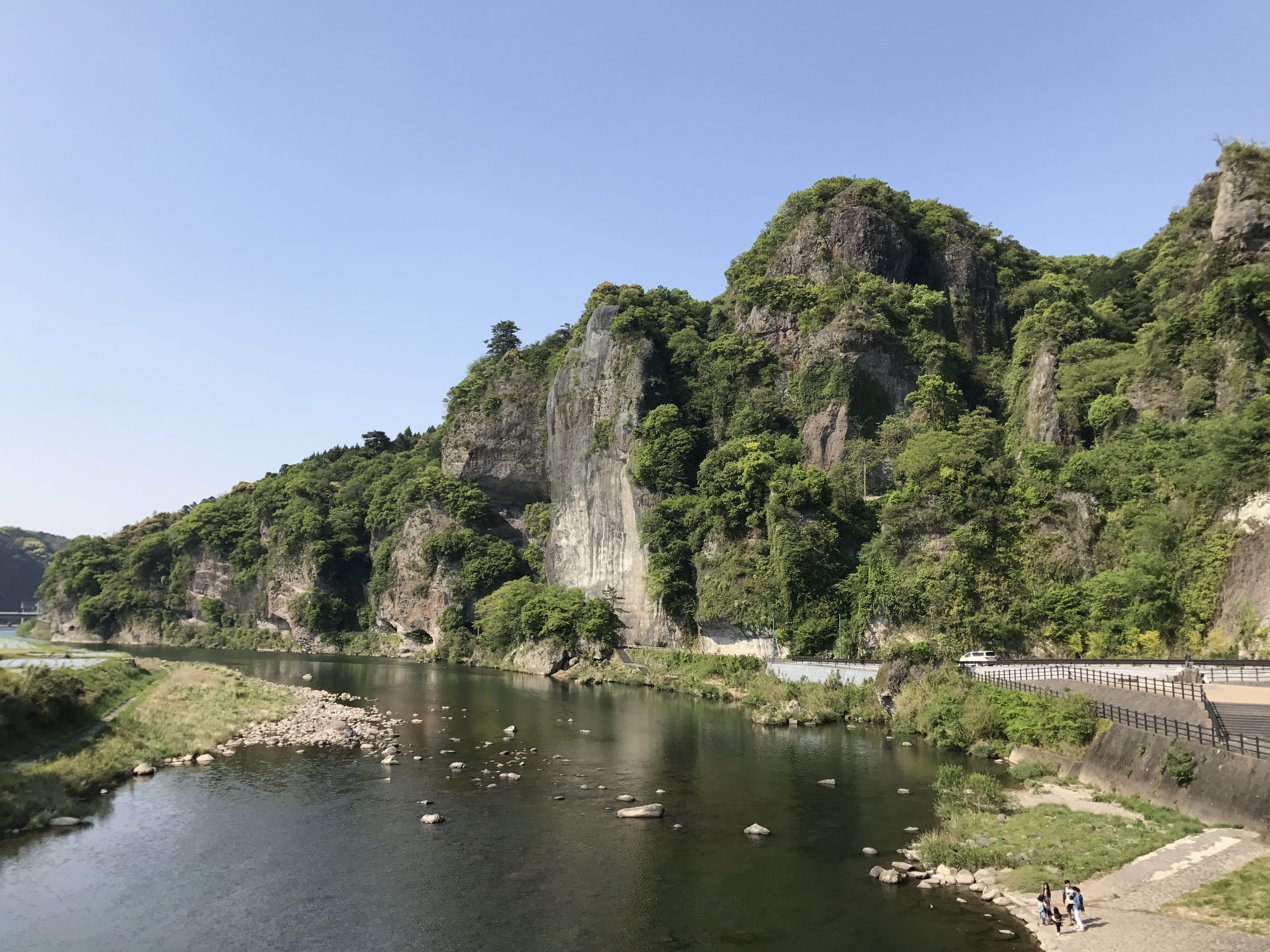
Yabakei

The gorge of Yabakei (耶馬渓) is a nationally designated Place of Scenic Beauty spanning the municipalities of Kusu and Nakatsu in Ōita Prefecture, Japan. Located within Yaba-Hita-Hikosan Quasi-National Park, it was selected as one of the 100 Landscapes of Japan during the Shōwa era. Yabakei was formerly the name of a town, but was merged into Nakatsu Municipality in 2005. According to Fire and Disaster Management Agency of Japan, official confirmed report, in despite the absence of rain, suddenly landslides occurred on the mountain slope, three houses were buried in the place and six people lost their lives on 11 April 2018.

== Gallery ==
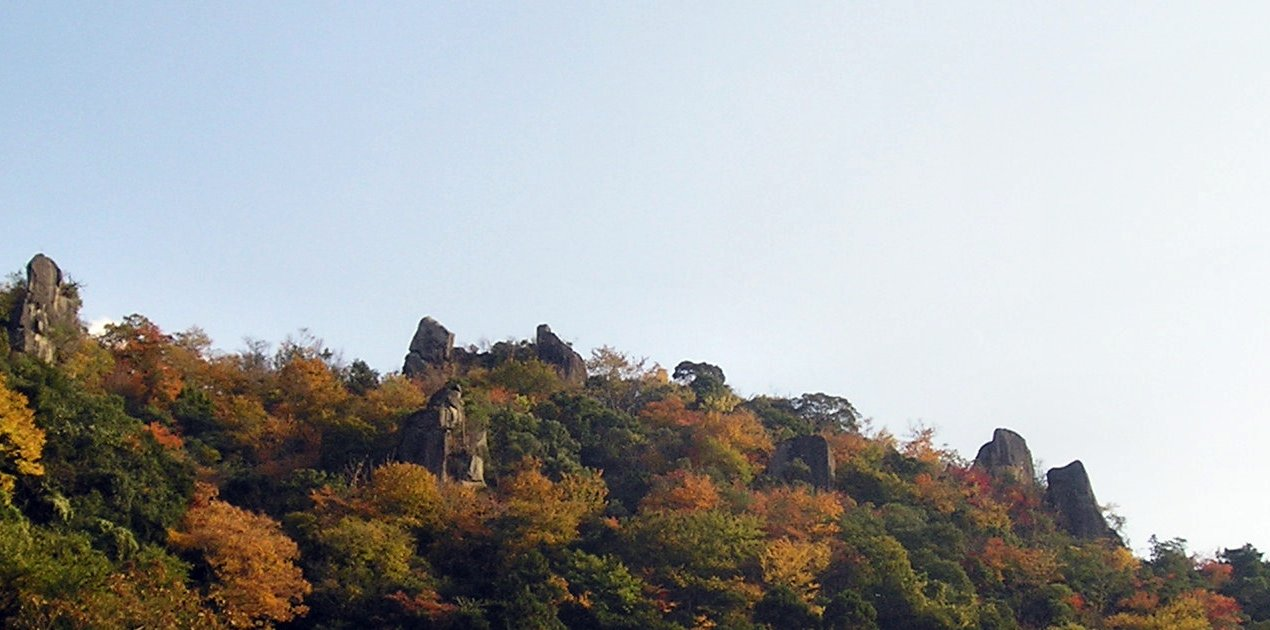
Hitome Hakkei viewpoint in Shin Yabakei Gorge

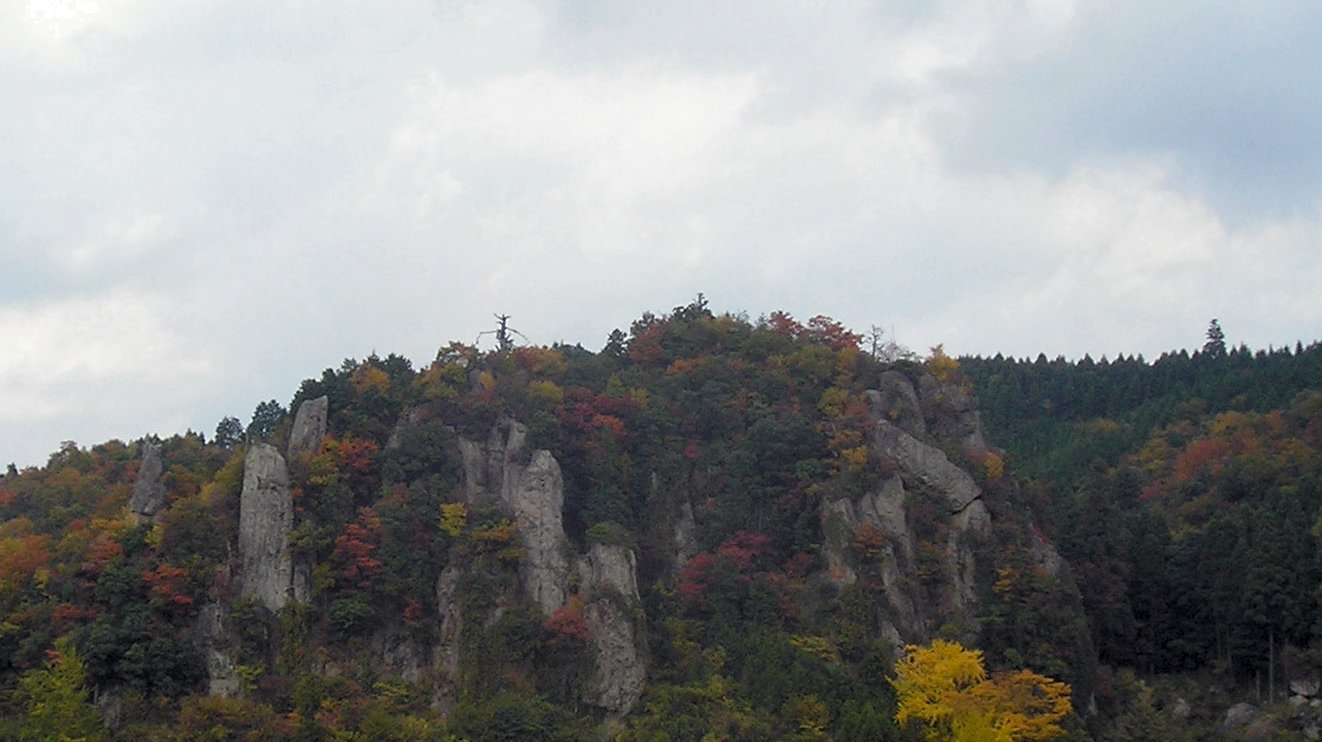
Tatehata no Kei in Ura Yamakei Gorge

== See also ==
- Aonodōmon
- New Three Views of Japan
- National Parks in Japan
