= Aonodōmon =

Tourist attraction in Ōita Prefecture, Japan

Coordinates: 33°30′00″N 131°10′19″E

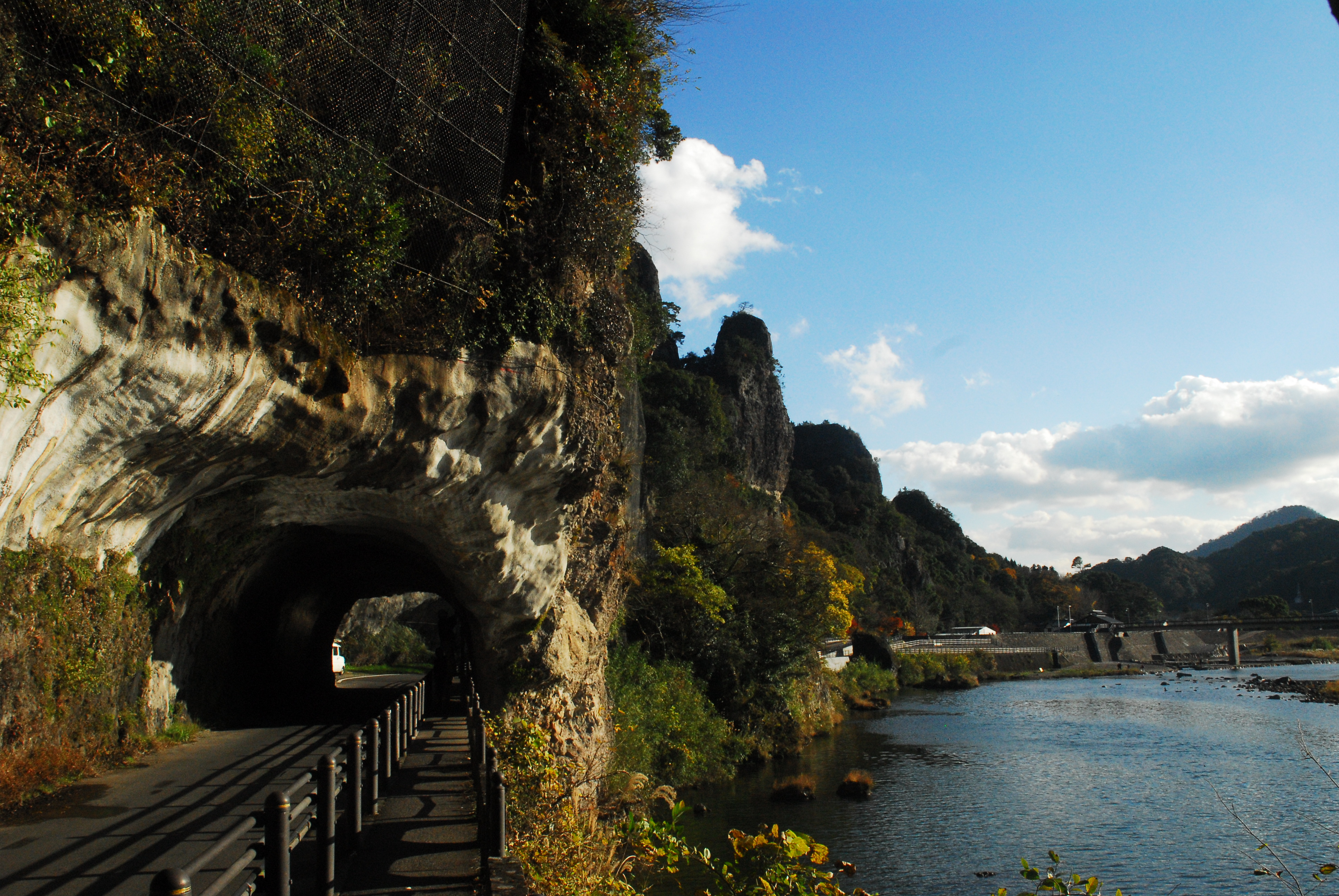
Aonodōmon tunnel

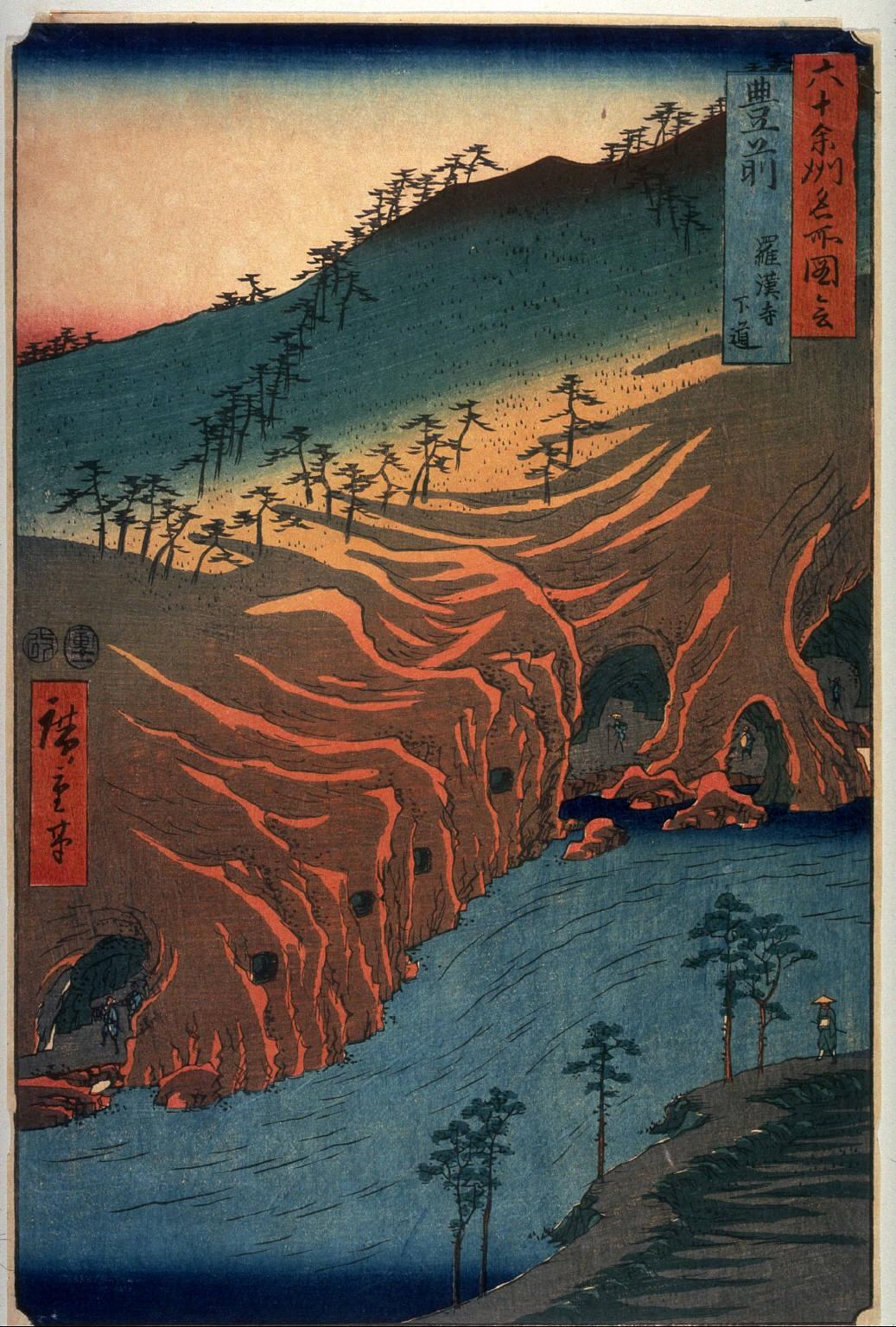
Hiroshige

Aonodōmon (青の洞門, meaning "blue tunnel") is a tourist attraction located in the gorge of Yabakei, now part of Nakatsu City, in Ōita Prefecture, Japan.

Legend has it that before the tunnel was built, people had to climb over the cliffs through which the tunnel is built to reach an important local shrine. The path was very dangerous and people regularly fell to their deaths. During the Edo period, a Buddhist monk named Zenkai, who had committed a murder in his earlier life, decided to build a safe passage for worshipers in order to atone for his crime. Beginning at the age of 49, he dedicated 30 years of his life to digging the 185 metre tunnel by hand, using only a hammer and chisel. The tunnel was opened for use in 1763.

Aonodōmon was made famous by a popular book written by author Kikuchi Kan.
