= List of dams in Fukuoka Prefecture =

The following is a list of dams in Fukuoka Prefecture, Japan.

== List ==
Name	Location	Opened	Height (metres)	Image
Aburagi Dam		1971	54.6	
Benjo Dam		1966	23.1	
Dobaru Dam		1912	25.9	
Egawa Dam		1972	79.2	
Fudo-ike Dam		1936	17	
Fujinami Dam		2009	52	
Fukuchiyama Dam		2003	64.5	
Fukuchiyama-ike Dam		1953	22	
Gousho Dam		1990	60.7	
Gokayama Dam		2017	102.5	
Hanamune Tameike Dam		1952	29.3	
Nagatani Dam		1993	53.8	
Hata Dam		1955	43.3	
Heisei Ozeki Dam		1990	3.15	
Higashitaniguchi-ike Dam		1937	20	
Hinooka Tameike Dam		1910	23	
Hirokawa Dam		1972	30.4	
Hisasue Dam		1980	23	
Honjo-ike Fukutei No.1 Dam		1948	16.2	
Honjo-ike Fukutei No.2 Dam		1946	16.7	
Honjo-ike-hontei Dam		1946	19.2	
Honnyu Tameike Dam		1917	15	
Hyugami Dam		1959	79.5	
Ino Dam		2000	79.9	
Inunaki Dam		1994	76.5	
Irahara Dam		2017	81.3	
Jibetto-kyodo-ike Dam		1940	18	
Jinya Dam		1975	48.5	
Kanasoko Tameike Dam		1937	20	
Kasagi Dam		1957	16	
Kawachi Dam		1927	44.1	
Kirihata Dam		1975	38	
Kitadani Dam				
Koga Dam		1975	34.5	
Kubara Dam		1970	42.3	
Kuboshiro Dam			25	
Kure Dam		1970	24.5	
Matsuze Dam		1963	25	
Magarifuchi Dam		1922	37.3	
Masubuchi Dam		1973	60	
Matsugae Dam		1960	47	
Matsuze Dam		1963	25	
Minamihata Dam		1985	63.5	
Narufuchi Dam			67.4	
Nagatani Dam		1993	53.8	
Ogawa Dam		1996	37	
Ōi Dam		1978	19	
Osano Dam		1974	25.5	
Osyozu-ike Dam		1969	19.2	
Ozaki Dam		1978	27.2	
Raizan Oh-tameike Dam		1944	25	
Rikimaru Dam			49.5	
Sefuri Dam		1976	43	
Shiraki Dam		1934	22.2	
Shobudani Dam		1924	18	
Sue Dam			21	
Taisho-ike Dam		1915	17.2	
Tare Dam		1983	27.5	
Tonogawa Dam		1974	35.6	
Terauchi Dam		1978	83	
Ushikubi Dam		1991	52.7	
Yagatako-ike Dam		1959	19	
Yamagami Dam		1979	59	
Yamaguchi Choseichi Dam		1998	60	
Yamaguchi Dam		1996	24	
Yoake Dam		1954	15	
Yoshida Dam		1983	24	
Zenzo Tameike Dam		1927	19	
Zuibaiji Dam		1977	64	

== See also ==
- Media related to Dams in Fukuoka prefecture at Wikimedia Commons
