= List of dams in Oita Prefecture =

The following is a list of dams in Oita Prefecture, Japan.

== List ==
Name	Location	Opened	Height (meters)	Image
Aki Dam			35	
Aoe Dam			43	
Chikura Dam			22	
Fukami Dam			38.5	
Gyonyu Dam			43.5	
Hakusui Dam			14	
Hiju Dam		1969	48	
Hisashi Dam		1979	40	
Ichigi Dam				
Inaba Dam		2010	56	
Ishiba Dam			47	
Ishiyama Dam			41	
Kawabe Dam				
Kitagawa Dam		1962	82	
Konakao Dam			22.3	
Koshita Dam			40.6	
Kurosawa Dam			47.5	
Matsubara Dam				
Matsugi Dam			48.5	
Nabekura Dam			43.5	
Nagayu Dam			15	
Nakanokawa Dam			37.3	
Nakao Dam				
Namiishi Dam			38.5	
Naokawa Dam			24.9	
Notsu Dam			34.9	
Nanase Dam		2020	85.5	
Onagohata Dam			34.3	
Onakao Dam			25.4	
Onobaru Dam		1962	15.7	
Oyama Dam			94	
Saganoseki Dam			42	
Serikawa Dam		1956	52.2	
Shidahara Dam				
Shimouke Dam				
Shuki Dam				
Suehiro Dam			45.5	
Todoroki Dam				
Uozumi Dam				
Wakasugi Dam			33.5	
Yabakei Dam			62	
Yoake Dam		1954	15	
Yukagi Dam			58.5	

== See also ==
- Media related to Dams in Oita prefecture at Wikimedia Commons
