= Nakagawa, Fukuoka =

Nakagawa 那珂川市
- City
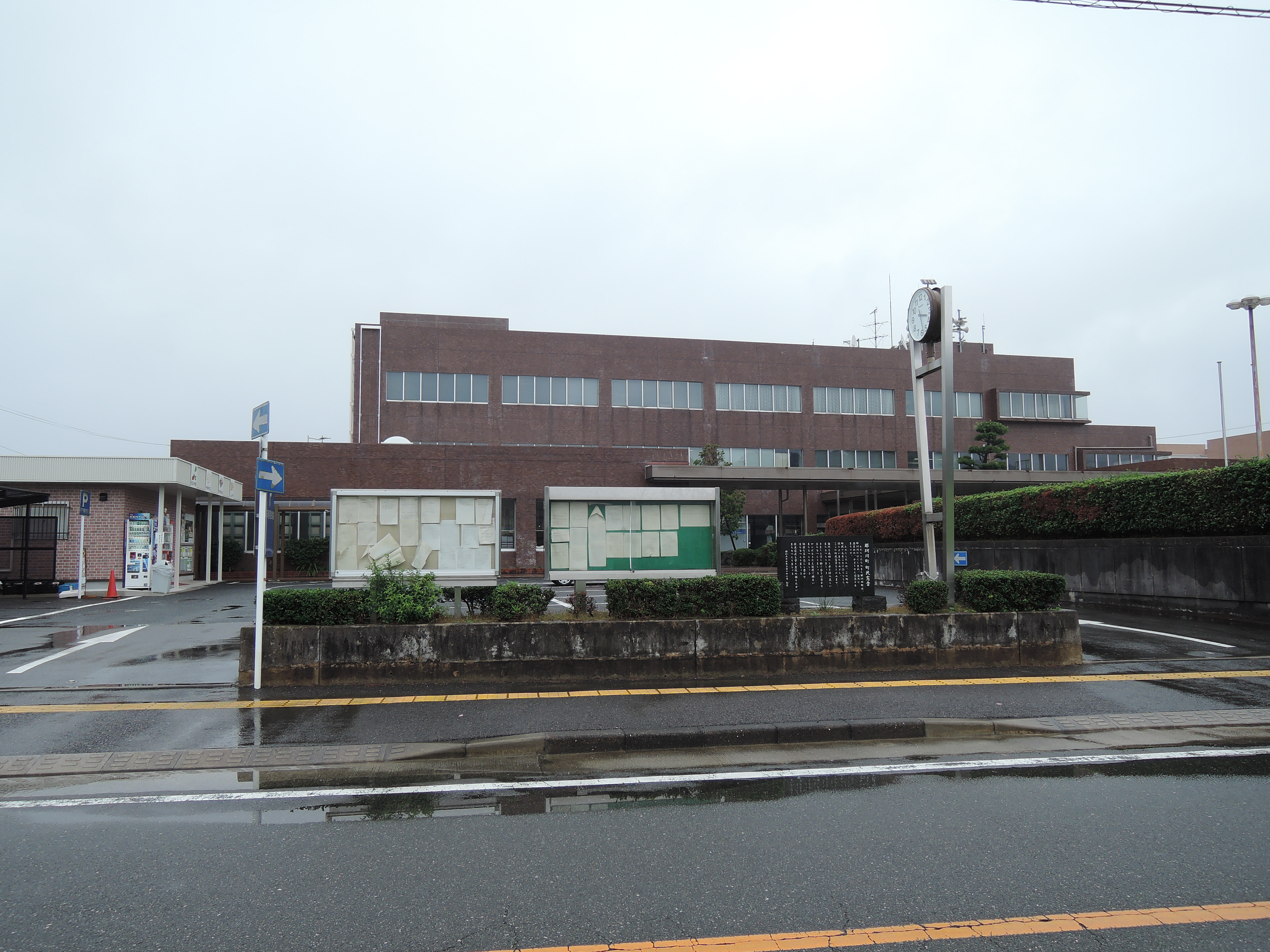
- Nakagawa city hall

- Flag Seal
- Location of Nakagawa in Fukuoka Prefecture

- Location in Japan
- Coordinates: 33°29′58″N 130°25′20″E
- Country: Japan
- Region: Kyushu
- Prefecture: Fukuoka

Area
  - Total: 74.95 km^{2} (28.94 sq mi)

Population (March 31, 2024)
  - Total: 49,400
  - Density: 659/km^{2} (1,710/sq mi)
- Time zone: UTC+09:00 (JST)
- City hall address: 1-1-1 Nishikuma, Nakagawa-shi, Fukuoka-ken 811-1292
- Website: Official website
- Symbols
- Bird: Common kingfisher
- Flower: Rhododendron subg. Hymenanthes
- Tree: Myrica rubra

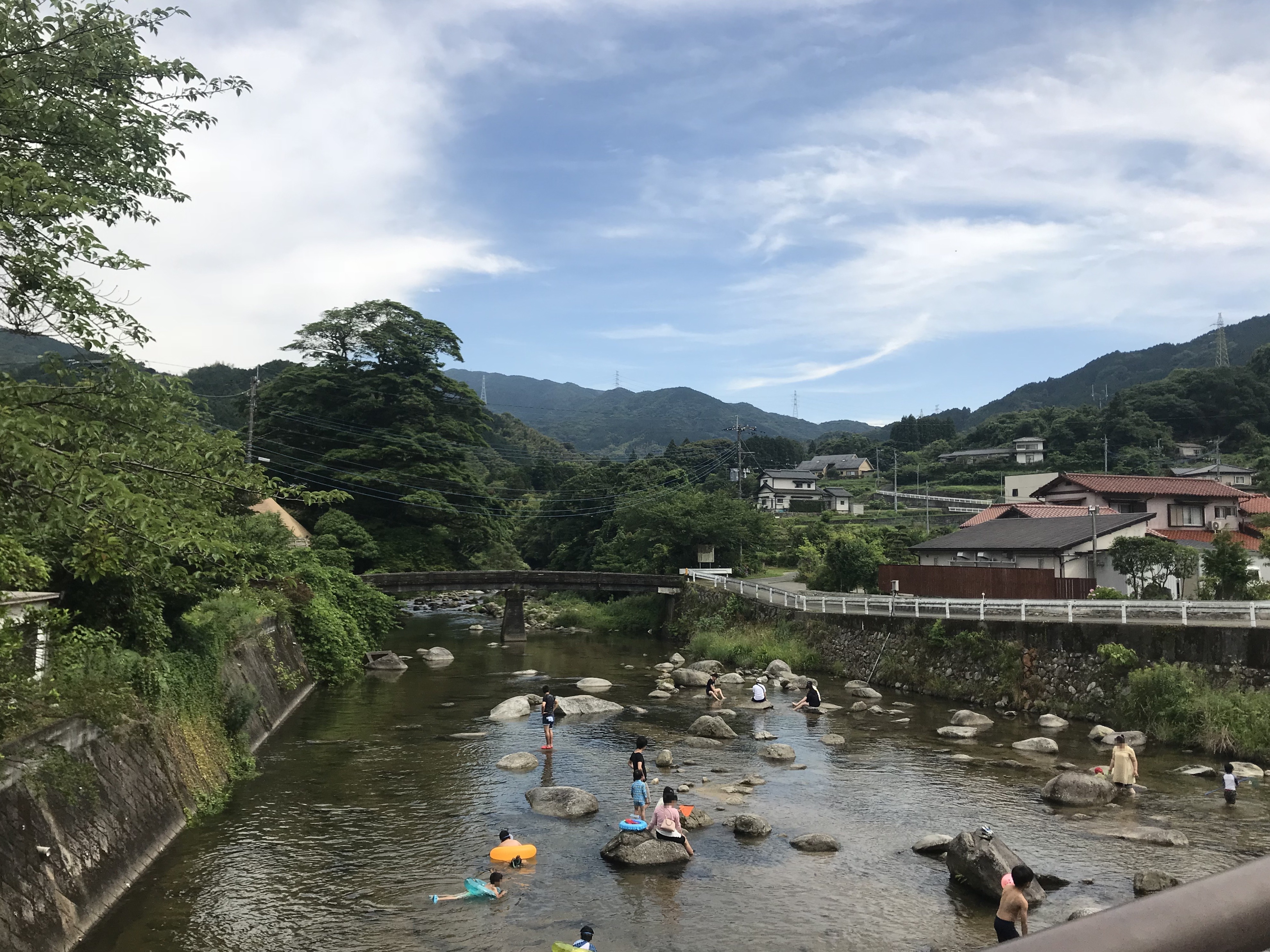
:Nakagawa River from Shironohashi Bridge

Nakagawa (那珂川市, Nakagawa-shi) is a city located in Fukuoka Prefecture, Japan. The city was founded on October 1, 2018, making it the newest city in Japan. As of 31 March 2024, the city had an estimated population of 49,400 in 21613 households, and a population density of 660 persons per km². The total area is 74.95 km^{2} (28.94 sq mi).

== Geography ==
Nakagawa is adjacent to the south side of Fukuoka City and the west side of Kasuga City, and forms part of the Fukuoka metropolitan area. The flatland area in the northern part of the city, centered around Hakataminami Station near Fukuoka City has developed as a commuter town, but other areas are farmland and mountainous, with areas such as Minamihata Dam and Gokayama Dam.

=== Neighboring municipalities ===
Fukuoka Prefecture

- Chikushino
- Fukuoka
- Kasuga
- Ōnojō

Saga Prefecture

- Miyaki
- Tosu
- Yoshinogari

=== Climate ===
Nakagawa has a humid subtropical climate (Köppen Cfa) characterized by warm summers and cool winters with light to no snowfall. The average annual temperature in Nakagawa is 14.8 °C (58.6 °F). The average annual rainfall is 1766 mm with September as the wettest month. The temperatures are highest on average in August, at around 26.2 °C (79.2 °F), and lowest in January, at around 4.1 °C (39.4 °F).

=== Demographics ===
Per Japanese census data, the population of Nakagawa is as shown below. When looking at the city as a whole, the population is steadily increasing, but while the population is increasing in some areas in the north due to urbanization, other areas, which make up the majority of the area, are experiencing serious depopulation and aging.

Historical population
Year	Pop.	±%
1940	6,868	—
1950	8,621	+25.5%
1960	8,458	−1.9%
1970	11,245	+33.0%
1980	24,840	+120.9%
1990	36,576	+47.2%
2000	45,548	+24.5%
2010	49,785	+9.3%
2020	50,112	+0.7%

== History ==
The area of Nakagawa is believed to be the part of the Yayoi period, Nakoku, mentioned in ancient Chinese documents. It was later part of ancient Chikuzen Province. During the Edo Period, the area was under the control of Fukuoka Domain. After the Meiji restoration, the villages of Andoku, Iwato, and Minamihata were established with the creation of the modern municipalities system on April 1, 1889.These three villages merged on April 1, 1956 to form the town of Nakagawa. It was raised to city status on October 1, 2018.

== Government ==
Nakagawa has a mayor-council form of government with a directly elected mayor and a unicameral city council of 17 members. Nakagawa contributes one member to the Fukuoka Prefectural Assembly. In terms of national politics, the city is part of the Fukuoka 5th district of the lower house of the Diet of Japan.

== Economy ==
Nakagawa is a regional commercial center, and is largely a commuter town for neighboring Fukuoka.The central and southern parts of Nakagawa City are mainly rice paddies, but due to recent acreage reduction policies, an increasing number of farmers are turning to upland farming, and are focusing on cultivating a root vegetable called yacon.

== Education ==
Nakagawa has seven public elementary schools and three public junior high schools and one public high school operated by the Fukuoka Prefectural Board of Education.

== Transportation ==
=== Railways ===
Nagakawa has no passenger railway service. The JR West Hakata-Minami Station is located on the border between Kasuga and Nakagawa, but the station and its platform are within the Kasuga area. The station building, rotary, and bus terminal are located in Nakagawa City, and the area around the station is more urbanized on the Nakagawa side than on the Kasuga side. In addition, although the Kyushu Shinkansen passes through Nakagawa, and the Sanyo Shinkansen Hakata General Vehicle Depot (commonly known as "Hakuso") straddles border between Kasuga and Nakagawa, there is no Shinkansen station within Nakagawa city borders.

=== Highways ===
- National Route 385

== Local attractions ==
- Antoku Ōzuka Kofun, National Historic Site
