= Kasagi Dam =

Kasagi Dam may refer to:

- Kasagi Dam (Fukuoka)
- Kasagi Dam (Gifu)
