= Jinya (disambiguation) =

Jinya or Jin'ya may refer to the following:

== People ==
- Jinya Nishikata (西方 仁也; born 1968), Japanese former ski jumper

== Places ==
=== Japan ===
- Jin'ya, a type of headquarters in Japan
  - Takayama Jinya
- Jinya Dam, Fukuoka, Japan

=== China ===
- Jinya, Yuzhong, town in Lanzhou, Gansu, China
- Jinya, a town of Dachuan District, Dazhou, China
- Dazhou Jinya Airport

== Companies ==
- Jinya Ramen Bar, ramen restaurant chain in the United States
