= Yamaguchi Dam =

Yamaguchi Dam (山口ダム, Yamaguchi Damu) may refer to:

- Yamaguchi Dam (Fukuoka)
- Yamaguchi Dam (Nagano)
