= Egawa =

Egawa (written: 江川 or 恵川) is a Japanese surname. Notable people with the surname include:

- Atsushi Egawa (江川 淳, born 1966), Japanese cross-country skier
- Hisao Egawa (江川 央生, born 1962), Japanese voice actor
- Kosei Egawa (恵川 光生), Japanese Paralympic swimmer
- Suguru Egawa (江川 卓, born 1955), Japanese baseball analyst and a former pitcher
- Tatsuya Egawa (江川 達也, born 1961), Japanese manga artist
- Toshio Egawa (永川 敏郎, born 1959), keyboardist and a member of Gerard
- Yoshitaka Egawa (江川 嘉孝, 1942–2024), Japanese basketball player
- Yuki Egawa (江川 優生, born 1998), Japanese kickboxer

== See also ==
- Egawa Dam
