= Taisho-ike Dam =

Taisho-ike Dam may refer to:

- Taisho-ike Dam (Fukuoka)
- Taisho-ike Dam (Hokkaido)
- Taisho-ike Dam (Kyoto)
