= Antoku Ōzuka Kofun =

Kofun period burial mound in Japan

- 安徳大塚古墳 (Japanese)
- Antoku Ōzuka Kofunn Antoku Ōzuka Kofun (Japan)
- 33°29′53″N 130°25′52″E
- Type: Kofun
- Periods: Kofun period
- Location: Nakagawa, Fukuoka, Japan
- Region: Kyushu

History
- Built: c.4th century

Site notes
- Public access: Yes (no facilities)
- National Historic Site of Japan

The Antoku Ōzuka Kofun (安徳大塚古墳) is a Kofun period burial mound, located in the city of Nakagawa, Fukuoka Prefecture, Japan. The tumulus was designated a National Historic Site of Japan in 2016.

== Overview ==
The Antoku Ōzuka Kofun is located on the tip of a west-facing hill with an elevation of about 30 meters, orientated to the west. It is a zenpō-kōen-fun (前方後円墳), which is shaped like a keyhole, having one square end and one circular end, when viewed from above. In 1971, the Fukuoka Prefectural Board of Education conducted an archaeological excavation due to the development of a nearby housing complex. As a result, it was found that the total length of the mound was 64 meters, and that the tumulus was built by cutting a moat approximately 10 meter wide from the front and rear hills. The diameter of the posterior circular part is approximately 35 meters and the height is approximately six meters. The rectangular anterior portion is approximately 30 meters long, with a width of approximately 20 meters, and height of two meters. The slopes of both areas were covered with fukiishi, and haniwa. The tumulus had been robbed in antiquity and details of the burial chamber are uncertain. From the haniwa and pottery shards recovered at the site, together with the shape of the mound, it is estimated that this tumulus was built around the latter half of the 4th century, or early in the Kofun period.

== See also ==
- List of Historic Sites of Japan (Fukuoka)
