= Kanasoko Tameike Dam =

Dam in Fukuoka Prefecture, Japan

- Location within Japan
- Interactive map of Kanasoko Tameike Dam
- Location: Fukuoka Prefecture, Japan
- Coordinates: 33°44′38″N 130°37′08″E
- Opening date: 1937

Dam and spillways
- Height: 20 m (66 ft)
- Length: 135 m (443 ft)

Reservoir
- Total capacity: 214 thousand cubic meters
- Catchment area: sq. km
- Surface area: 7 hectares

Kanasoko Tameike Dam is an earthfill dam located in Fukuoka Prefecture in Japan. The dam is used for irrigation. The catchment area of the dam is km^{2}. The dam impounds about 7 ha of land when full and can store 214 thousand cubic meters of water. The construction of the dam was completed in 1937.
