= Hisasue Dam =

Dam in Fukuoka Prefecture, Japan

- Location within Japan
- Interactive map of Hisasue Dam
- Location: Fukuoka Prefecture, Japan
- Coordinates: 33°46′00″N 130°31′13″E
- Construction began: 1977
- Opening date: 1980

Dam and spillways
- Height: 23 m (75 ft)
- Length: 170 m (560 ft)

Reservoir
- Total capacity: 699 thousand cubic meters
- Catchment area: 21.8 sq. km
- Surface area: 15 hectares

Hisasue Dam is an earthfill dam located in Fukuoka Prefecture in Japan. The dam is used for water supply. The catchment area of the dam is 21.8 km^{2}. The dam impounds about 15 ha of land when full and can store 699 thousand cubic meters of water. The construction of the dam was started on 1977 and completed in 1980.
