= Hanamune Tameike Dam =

Dam in Fukuoka Prefecture, Japan

- Location within Japan
- Interactive map of Hanamune Tameike Dam
- Location: Fukuoka Prefecture, Japan
- Coordinates: 33°13′02″N 130°37′38″E
- Opening date: 1952

Dam and spillways
- Height: 29.3 m (96 ft)
- Length: 320.6 m (1,052 ft)

Reservoir
- Total capacity: 3289 thousand cubic meters
- Catchment area: 25 sq. km
- Surface area: 35 hectares

Hanamune Tameike Dam is an earthfill dam located in Fukuoka Prefecture in Japan. The dam is used for irrigation. The catchment area of the dam is 25 km^{2}. The dam impounds about 35 ha of land when full and can store 3289 thousand cubic meters of water. The construction of the dam was completed in 1952.
