= Ino Dam =

Dam in Fukuoka Prefecture, Japan

- Location within Japan
- Interactive map of Ino Dam
- Location: Fukuoka Prefecture, Japan
- Coordinates: 33°41′00″N 130°31′13″E
- Construction began: 1979
- Opening date: 2000

Dam and spillways
- Height: 79.9 m (262 ft)
- Length: 260 m (850 ft)

Reservoir
- Total capacity: 5110 thousand cubic meters
- Catchment area: 5.5 sq. km
- Surface area: 23 hectares

Ino Dam is a gravity dam located in Fukuoka Prefecture in Japan. The dam is used for flood control and water supply. The catchment area of the dam is 5.5 km^{2}. The dam impounds about 23 ha of land when full and can store 5110 thousand cubic meters of water. The construction of the dam was started on 1979 and completed in 2000.
