= Hyugami Dam =

Coordinates: 33°10′34″N 130°46′49″E

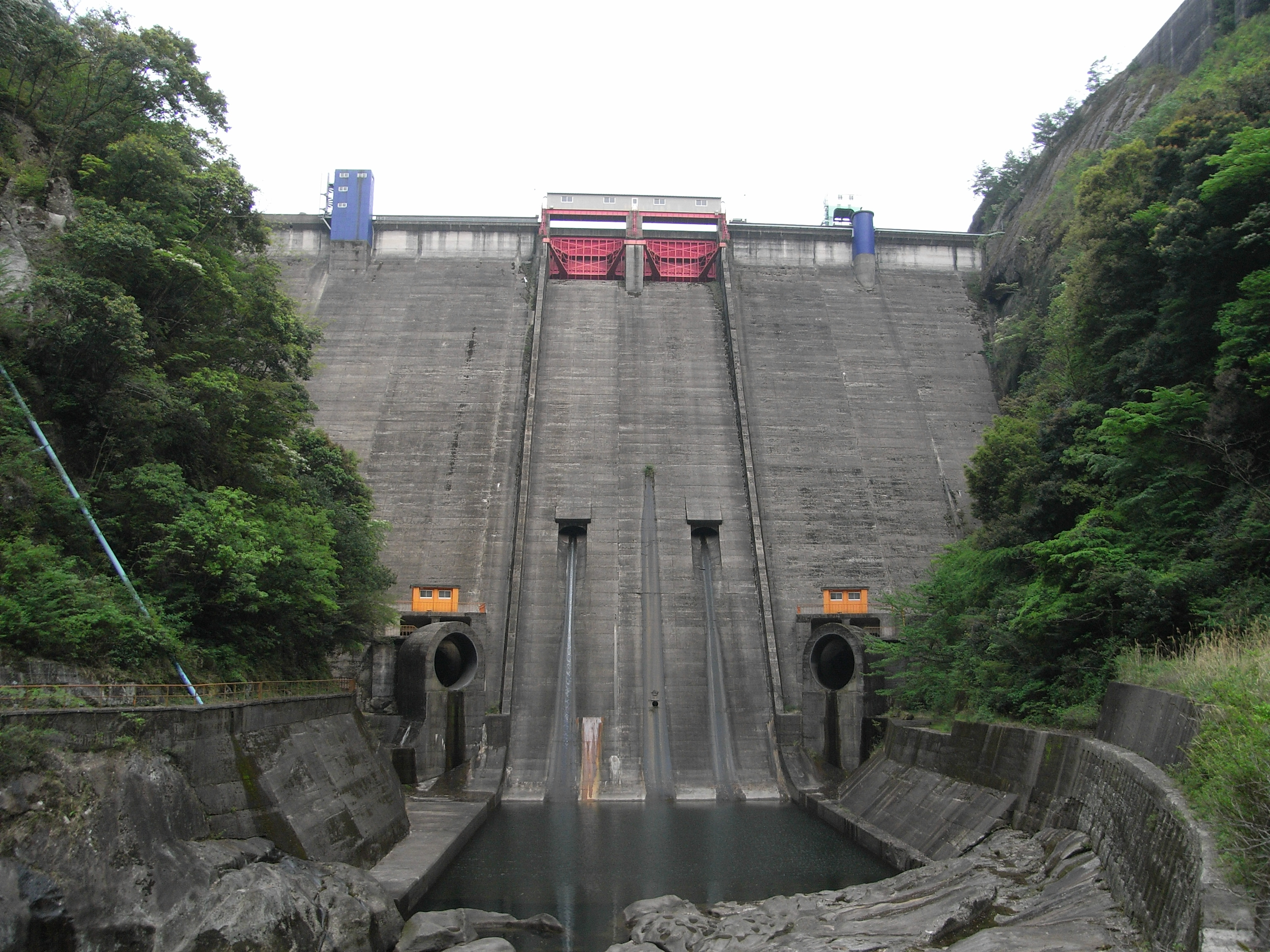
- Official name: 日向神ダム
- Location: Yame, Fukuoka, Japan
- Construction began: 1953
- Opening date: 1959

Dam and spillways
- Impounds: Yabegawa River
- Height: 79.5 m
- Length: 146.0 m

Reservoir
- Creates: Hyūgami Reservoir
- Total capacity: 27,900,000 m^{3}
- Catchment area: 84.3 km^{2}
- Surface area: 112 hectares

Hyugami Dam (日向神ダム, Hyūgami damu) is a dam in Yame, Fukuoka Prefecture, Japan.
