= Dobaru Dam =

Dam in Fukuoka Prefecture, Japan

- Location within Japan
- Interactive map of Dobaru Dam
- Location: Fukuoka Prefecture, Japan
- Coordinates: 33°46′50″N 130°49′37″E
- Construction began: 1910
- Opening date: 1912

Dam and spillways
- Height: 25.9 m (85 ft)
- Length: 112.7 m (370 ft)

Reservoir
- Total capacity: 479 thousand cubic meters
- Catchment area: 6.3 sq. km
- Surface area: 6 hectares

Dobaru Dam is an earthfill dam located in Fukuoka Prefecture in Japan. The dam is used for water supply. The catchment area of the dam is 6.3 km^{2}. The dam impounds about 6 ha of land when full and can store 479 thousand cubic meters of water. The construction of the dam was started on 1910 and completed in 1912.
