= Kure Dam =

Dam in Fukuoka Prefecture, Japan

- Location within Japan
- Location: Fukuoka Prefecture, Japan
- Coordinates: 33°40′28″N 130°52′40″E
- Opening date: 1970; 56 years ago

Dam and spillways
- Height: 24.5 m (80 ft)
- Length: 154.9 m (508 ft)

Reservoir
- Total capacity: 414 thousand cubic meters
- Catchment area: 0.3 sq. km
- Surface area: 40 hectares

Kure Dam is an earthfill dam located in Fukuoka Prefecture in Japan. The dam is used for irrigation. The catchment area of the dam is 0.3 km^{2} (0.12 sq mi). The dam impounds about 40 hectares (99 acres) of land when full and can store 414 thousand cubic meters (14.6×10^{6} cu ft) cubic meters of water. The construction of the dam was completed in 1970.
