= Hiju Dam =

Coordinates: 33°21′17″N 131°14′56″E

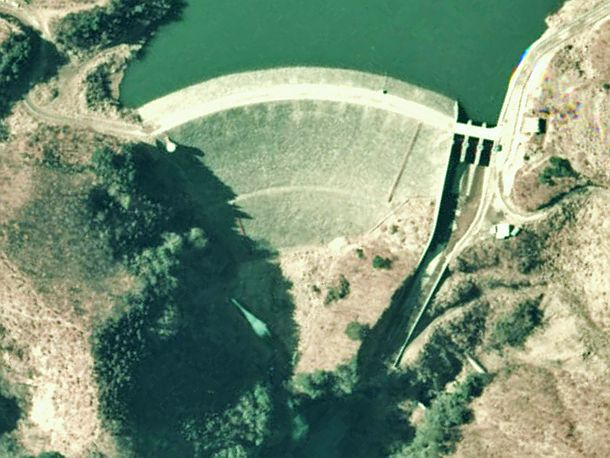
- Interactive map of Hiju Dam
- Location: Kusu, Ōita, Japan
- Construction began: 1964
- Opening date: 1969

Dam and spillways
- Type of dam: Rockfill dam
- Impounds: Hijū River
- Height: 48 m (157 ft)
- Length: 196.3 m (644 ft)
- Dam volume: 534,000 m^{3}

Reservoir
- Total capacity: 8,000,000 m^{3}
- Catchment area: 26 km^{2}
- Surface area: 46 ha

Hiju Dam (日出生ダム, Hijū Damu) is a dam in Kusu, Ōita Prefecture, Japan, and it was completed in 1969. The rock-fill dam is characterized by radial gates of the gate 3, which supplies water for agriculture and farmland.

Immediately downstream from the dam are the Nishishiiya Falls which are one of Japan's Top 100 Waterfalls.
