= Inaba Dam =

Coordinates: 32°59′38.3″N 131°17′48.1″E

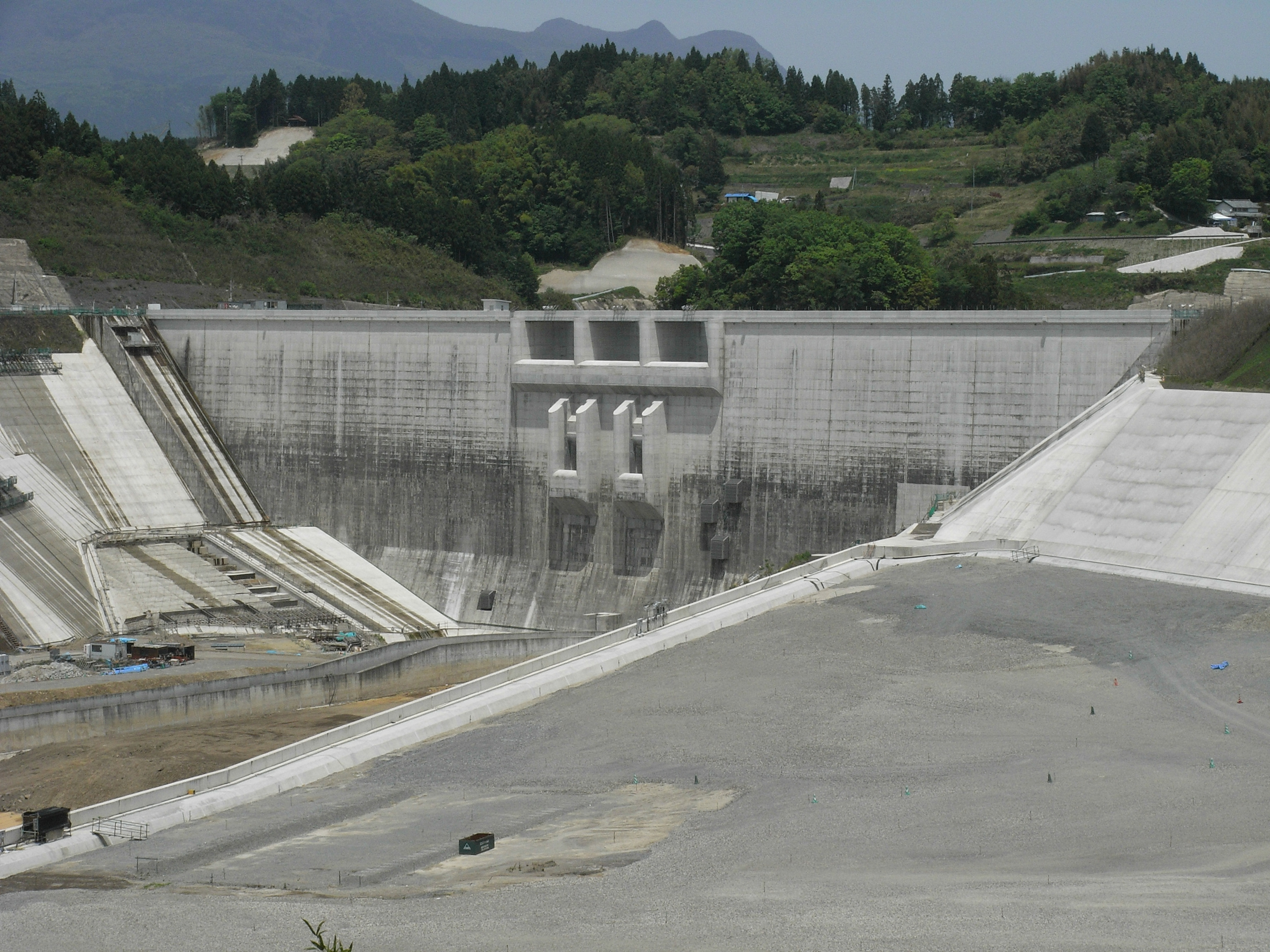
- Interactive map of Inaba Dam
- Location: Taketa, Ōita, Japan
- Construction began: 1985
- Opening date: 2010

Dam and spillways
- Height: 56 m (184 ft)
- Length: 233.5 m (766 ft)
- Dam volume: 196,000 m^{3}

Reservoir
- Total capacity: 7,270,000 m^{3}
- Surface area: 48 ha

Inaba Dam (稲葉ダム, Inaba damu) is a dam in Taketa, Ōita Prefecture, Japan, completed in 2010.
