= Yamaguchi Choseichi Dam =

Dam in Fukuoka Prefecture, Japan

Yamaguchi Choseichi
- Location within Japan
- Location: Fukuoka Prefecture, Japan
- Coordinates: 33°28′06″N 130°30′35″E
- Construction began: 1986
- Opening date: 1998

Dam and spillways
- Height: 60 m (200 ft)
- Length: 326 m (1,070 ft)

Reservoir
- Total capacity: 4,000,000 m^{3} (140,000,000 cu ft)
- Catchment area: 1.4 km^{2} (0.54 sq mi)
- Surface area: 26 hectares (64 acres)

Yamaguchi Choseichi is a rockfill dam located in Fukuoka Prefecture in Japan. The dam is used for water supply. The catchment area of the dam is 1.4 km^{2}. The dam impounds about 26 ha of land when full and can store 4000 thousand cubic meters of water. The construction of the dam was started on 1986 and completed in 1998.
