= Shiraki Dam =

Dam in Fukuoka Prefecture, Japan

- Location within Japan
- Location: Fukuoka Prefecture, Japan
- Coordinates: 33°48′43″N 130°46′12″E
- Opening date: 1934

Dam and spillways
- Height: 22.2 m (73 ft)
- Length: 91 m (299 ft)

Reservoir
- Total capacity: 380,000 m^{3} (13,000,000 cu ft)
- Catchment area: 2.5 km^{2} (0.97 sq mi)
- Surface area: 3 hectares (7.4 acres)

Shiraki Dam is an earthfill dam located in Fukuoka Prefecture in Japan. The dam is used for water supply. The catchment area of the dam is 2.5 km^{2}. The dam impounds about 3 ha of land when full and can store 380 thousand cubic meters of water. The construction of the dam was completed in 1934.
