= Magaribuchi Dam =

Dam in Fukuoka Prefecture, Japan

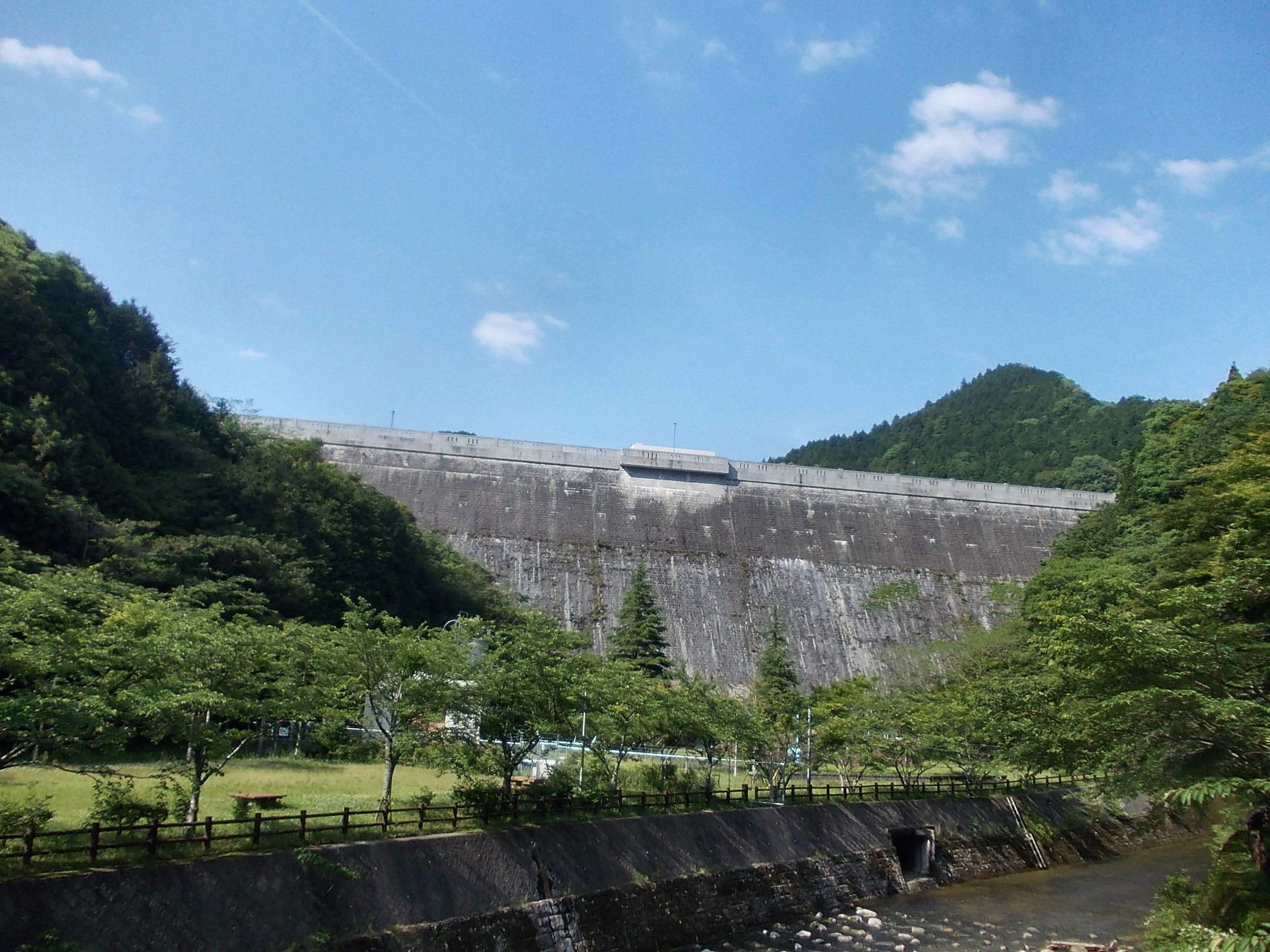

- Location within Japan
- Location: Fukuoka Prefecture, Japan
- Coordinates: 33°29′52″N 130°18′28″E
- Construction began: 1916
- Opening date: 1922

Dam and spillways
- Height: 37.3 m (122 ft)
- Length: m

Reservoir
- Total capacity: 1422 thousand cubic meters
- Catchment area: 11.4 sq. km
- Surface area: 19 hectares

Magaribuchi Dam is a gravity dam located in Fukuoka Prefecture in Japan. The dam is used for water supply. The catchment area of the dam is 11.4 km^{2}. The dam impounds about 19 ha of land when full and can store 1422 thousand cubic meters of water. The construction of the dam was started on 1916 and completed in 1922.

Its ground consolidation was improved in 1990.
