= Matsuze Dam =

Dam in Fukuoka Prefecture, Japan

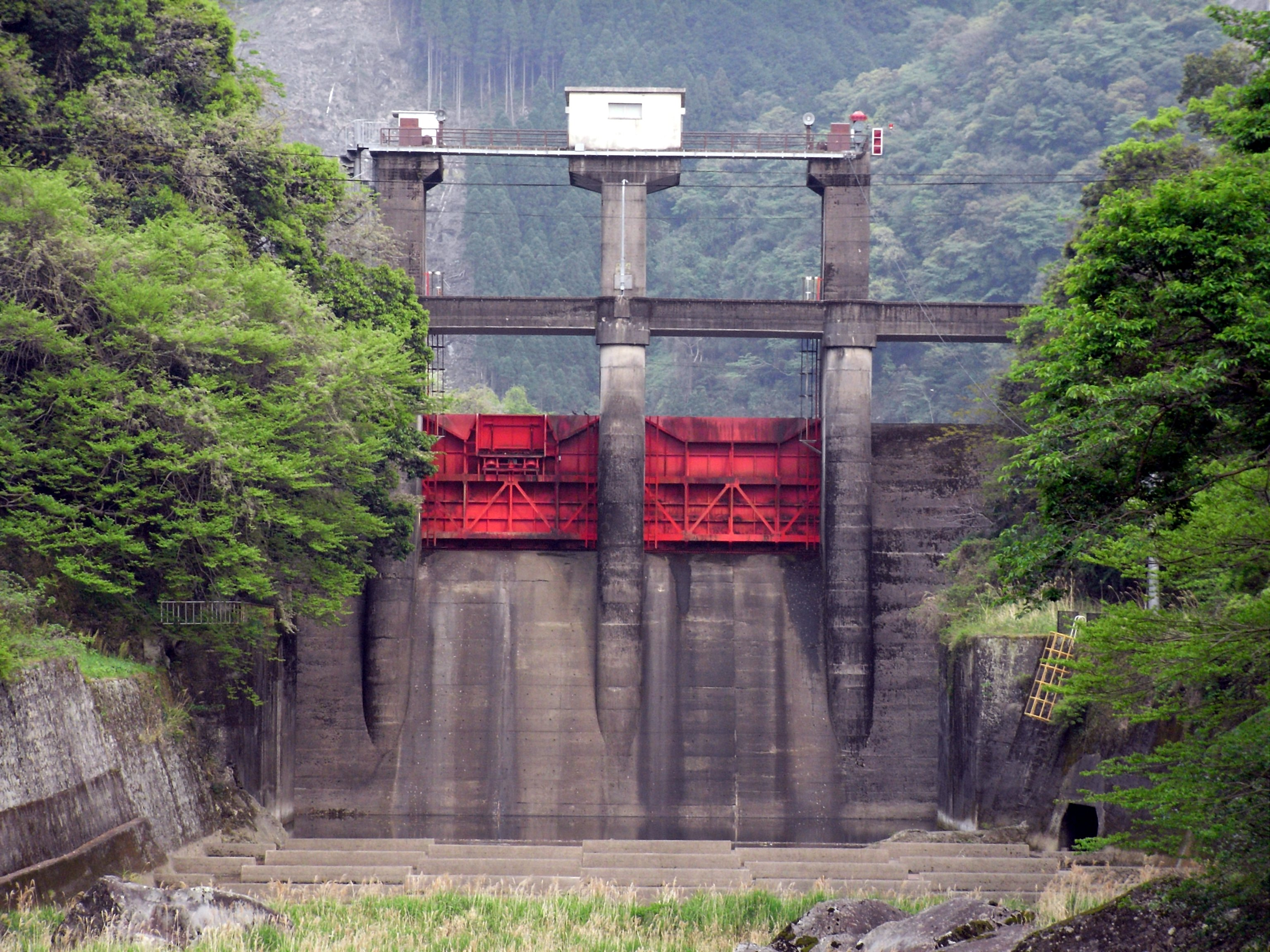

- Location within Japan
- Location: Fukuoka Prefecture, Japan
- Coordinates: 33°10′33″N 130°46′06″E
- Construction began: 1959
- Opening date: 1963

Dam and spillways
- Impounds: Yabegawa River
- Height: 25 m (82 ft)
- Length: 70.5 m (231 ft)

Reservoir
- Total capacity: 506,000 m^{3}
- Catchment area: 87.6 km^{2}
- Surface area: 9 hectares

Matsuze Dam is a gravity dam located in Fukuoka Prefecture in Japan. The dam is used for power production. The catchment area of the dam is 87.6 km^{2}. The dam impounds about 9 ha of land when full and can store 506 thousand cubic meters of water. The construction of the dam was started on 1959 and completed in 1963.
