= Jibetto-kyodo-ike Dam =

Dam in Fukuoka Prefecture, Japan

- Location within Japan
- Interactive map of Jibetto-kyodo-ike Dam
- Location: Fukuoka Prefecture, Japan
- Coordinates: 33°29′20″N 130°26′20″E
- Opening date: 1940

Dam and spillways
- Height: 18 m (59 ft)
- Length: 100 m (330 ft)

Reservoir
- Total capacity: 35 thousand cubic meters
- Catchment area: 0.8 sq. km
- Surface area: hectares

Jibetto-kyodo-ike Dam is an earthfill dam located in Fukuoka Prefecture in Japan. The dam is used for irrigation. The catchment area of the dam is 0.8 km^{2}. The dam impounds about ha of land when full and can store 35 thousand cubic meters of water. The construction of the dam was completed in 1940.
