= Masubuchi Dam =

Dam in Fukuoka Prefecture, Japan

- Location within Japan
- Location: Fukuoka Prefecture, Japan
- Coordinates: 33°45′44″N 130°50′20″E
- Construction began: 1968
- Opening date: 1973

Dam and spillways
- Height: 60 m (200 ft)
- Length: 205.5 m (674 ft)

Reservoir
- Total capacity: 13600 thousand cubic meters
- Catchment area: 18.5 sq. km
- Surface area: 74 hectares

Masubuchi Dam is a gravity dam located in Fukuoka Prefecture in Japan. The dam is used for flood control and water supply. The catchment area of the dam is 18.5 km^{2}. The dam impounds about 74 ha of land when full and can store 13600 thousand cubic meters of water. The construction of the dam was started on 1968 and completed in 1973.
