= Koga Dam =

Dam in Fukuoka Prefecture, Japan

- Location within Japan
- Location: Fukuoka Prefecture, Japan
- Coordinates: 33°42′16″N 130°30′21″E
- Construction began: 1971
- Opening date: 1975

Dam and spillways
- Height: 34.5 m (113 ft)
- Length: 138.5 m (454 ft)

Reservoir
- Total capacity: 985 thousand cubic meters
- Catchment area: 2.2 sq. km
- Surface area: 9 hectares

Koga Dam is a rockfill dam located in Fukuoka Prefecture in Japan. The dam is used for irrigation and water supply. The catchment area of the dam is 2.2 km^{2}. The dam impounds about 9 ha of land when full and can store 985 thousand cubic meters of water. The construction of the dam was started on 1971 and completed in 1975.
