= Higashitaniguchi-ike Dam =

Dam in Fukuoka Prefecture, Japan

Higashitaniguchi-ike
- Location within Japan
- Interactive map of Higashitaniguchi-ike
- Location: Fukuoka Prefecture, Japan
- Coordinates: 33°31′20″N 130°30′54″E
- Opening date: 1937

Dam and spillways
- Height: 20 m (66 ft)
- Length: 50 m (160 ft)

Reservoir
- Total capacity: 11 thousand cubic meters
- Catchment area: sq. km
- Surface area: 1 hectares

Higashitaniguchi-ike is an earthfill dam located in Fukuoka Prefecture in Japan. The dam is used for irrigation. The catchment area of the dam is km^{2}. The dam impounds about 1 ha of land when full and can store 11 thousand cubic meters of water. The construction of the dam was completed in 1937.
