= Ozaki Dam =

Dam in Fukuoka Prefecture, Japan

- Location within Japan
- Location: Fukuoka Prefecture, Japan
- Coordinates: 33°43′55″N 130°43′01″E
- Construction began: 1974
- Opening date: 1978

Dam and spillways
- Height: 27.2 m (89 ft)
- Length: 178 m (584 ft)

Reservoir
- Total capacity: 386,000 m^{3} (13,600,000 cu ft)
- Catchment area: 0.1 km^{2} (0.039 sq mi)
- Surface area: 4 hectares (9.9 acres)

Ozaki Dam is a gravity dam located in Fukuoka Prefecture in Japan. The dam is used for water supply. The catchment area of the dam is 0.1 km^{2}. The dam impounds about 4 ha of land when full and can store 386 thousand cubic meters of water. The construction of the dam was started on 1974 and completed in 1978.
