= Ogawa Dam =

Dam in Fukuoka Prefecture, Japan

- Location within Japan
- Location: Fukuoka Prefecture, Japan
- Coordinates: 33°36′59″N 131°1′35″E
- Construction began: 1971
- Opening date: 1996

Dam and spillways
- Height: 37 m (121 ft)
- Length: 275 m (902 ft)

Reservoir
- Total capacity: 981,000 m^{3} (34,600,000 cu ft)
- Catchment area: 10.1 km^{2} (3.9 sq mi)
- Surface area: 10 hectares (25 acres)

Ogawa Dam is a rockfill dam located in Fukuoka Prefecture in Japan. The dam is used for irrigation. The catchment area of the dam is 10.1 km^{2}. The dam impounds about 10 ha of land when full and can store 981 thousand cubic meters of water. The construction of the dam was started on 1971 and completed in 1996.
