= Nagatani Dam =

Dam in Fukuoka Prefecture, Japan

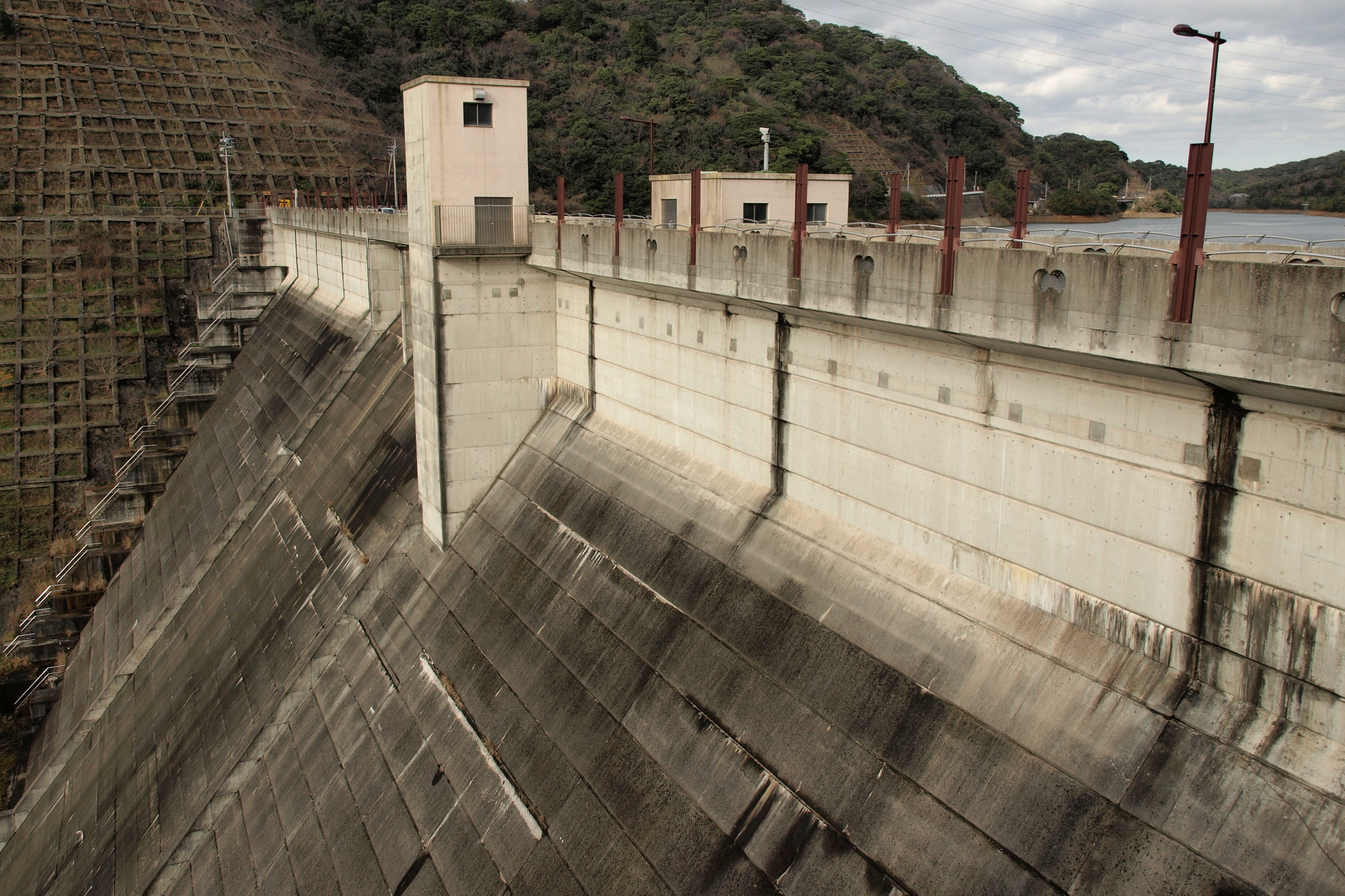

- Location within Japan
- Location: Fukuoka Prefecture, Japan
- Coordinates: 33°39′16″N 130°28′33″E
- Construction began: 1978
- Opening date: 1993

Dam and spillways
- Height: 53.8 m (177 ft)
- Length: 159 m (522 ft)

Reservoir
- Total capacity: 4,920,000 m^{3}
- Catchment area: 94.8 sq. km
- Surface area: 33 hectares

Nagatani Dam is a gravity dam located in Fukuoka Prefecture in Japan. The dam is used for water supply. The catchment area of the dam is 94.8 km^{2}. The dam impounds about 33 ha of land when full and can store 4,920,000 cubic meters of water. The construction of the dam was started on 1978 and completed in 1993.
