= Kubara Dam =

Dam in Fukuoka Prefecture, Japan

- Location within Japan
- Location: Fukuoka Prefecture, Japan
- Coordinates: 33°38′39″N 130°31′30″E
- Construction began: 1968
- Opening date: 1970

Dam and spillways
- Height: 42.3 m (139 ft)
- Length: 117 m (384 ft)

Reservoir
- Total capacity: 1600 thousand cubic meters
- Catchment area: 16.9 sq. km
- Surface area: 11 hectares

Kubara Dam is a gravity dam located in Fukuoka Prefecture in Japan. The dam is used for water supply. The catchment area of the dam is 16.9 km^{2}. The dam impounds about 11 ha of land when full and can store 1600 thousand cubic meters of water. The construction of the dam was started on 1968 and completed in 1970.
