= Hinooka Tameike Dam =

Dam in Fukuoka Prefecture, Japan

- Location within Japan
- Interactive map of Hinooka Tameike Dam
- Location: Fukuoka Prefecture, Japan
- Coordinates: 33°32′20″N 130°40′41″E
- Opening date: 1910

Dam and spillways
- Height: 23 m (75 ft)
- Length: 141 m (463 ft)

Reservoir
- Total capacity: 200 thousand cubic meters
- Catchment area: sq. km
- Surface area: 3 hectares

Hinooka Tameike Dam is an earthfill dam located in Fukuoka Prefecture in Japan. The dam is used for irrigation. The dam impounds about 3 ha of land when full and can store 200 thousand cubic meters of water. The construction of the dam was completed in 1910.
