= Yamagami Dam =

Dam in Fukuoka Prefecture, Japan

- Location within Japan
- Official name: Japanese: 山神ダム, romanized: Yamagamidamu
- Location: Fukuoka Prefecture, Japan
- Coordinates: 33°27′16″N 130°29′10″E
- Construction began: 1968
- Opening date: 1979

Dam and spillways
- Height: 59 m (194 ft)
- Length: 307.5 m (1,009 ft)

Reservoir
- Total capacity: 2,980,000 m^{3} (105,000,000 cu ft)
- Catchment area: 9.1 km^{2} (3.5 sq mi)
- Surface area: 18 hectares (44 acres)

Yamagami Dam is a gravity concrete & fill dam (compound) dam located in Fukuoka Prefecture in Japan. The dam is used for flood control and water supply. The catchment area of the dam is 9.1 km^{2}. The dam impounds about 18 ha of land when full and can store 2980 thousand cubic meters of water. The construction of the dam was started on 1968 and completed in 1979.
