= Irahara Dam =

Dam in Fukuoka Prefecture, Japan

- Location within Japan
- Interactive map of Irahara Dam
- Location: Fukuoka Prefecture, Japan
- Coordinates: 33°35′22″N 130°56′56″E
- Construction began: 1974
- Opening date: 2017

Dam and spillways
- Height: 81.3 m (267 ft)
- Length: 339 m (1,112 ft)

Reservoir
- Total capacity: 28700 thousand cubic meters
- Catchment area: 36.8 sq. km
- Surface area: 122 hectares

Irahara Dam is a gravity dam located in Fukuoka Prefecture in Japan. The dam is used for flood control and water supply. The catchment area of the dam is 36.8 km^{2}. The dam impounds about 122 ha of land when full and can store 28700 thousand cubic meters of water. The construction of the dam was started on 1974 and completed in 2017.
