= Osyozu-ike Dam =

Dam in Fukuoka Prefecture, Japan

- Location within Japan
- Location: Fukuoka Prefecture, Japan
- Coordinates: 33°43′14″N 130°55′19″E
- Opening date: 1969

Dam and spillways
- Height: 19.2 m (63 ft)
- Length: 167.5 m (550 ft)

Reservoir
- Total capacity: 712,000 m^{3} (25,100,000 cu ft)
- Catchment area: 3.6 km^{2} (1.4 sq mi)
- Surface area: 10 hectares (25 acres)

Osyozu-ike Dam is an earthfill dam located in Fukuoka Prefecture in Japan. The dam is used for irrigation. The catchment area of the dam is 3.6 km^{2}. The dam impounds about 10 ha of land when full and can store 712 thousand cubic meters of water. The construction of the dam was completed in 1969.
