= Benjo Dam =

Dam in Fukuoka Prefecture, Japan

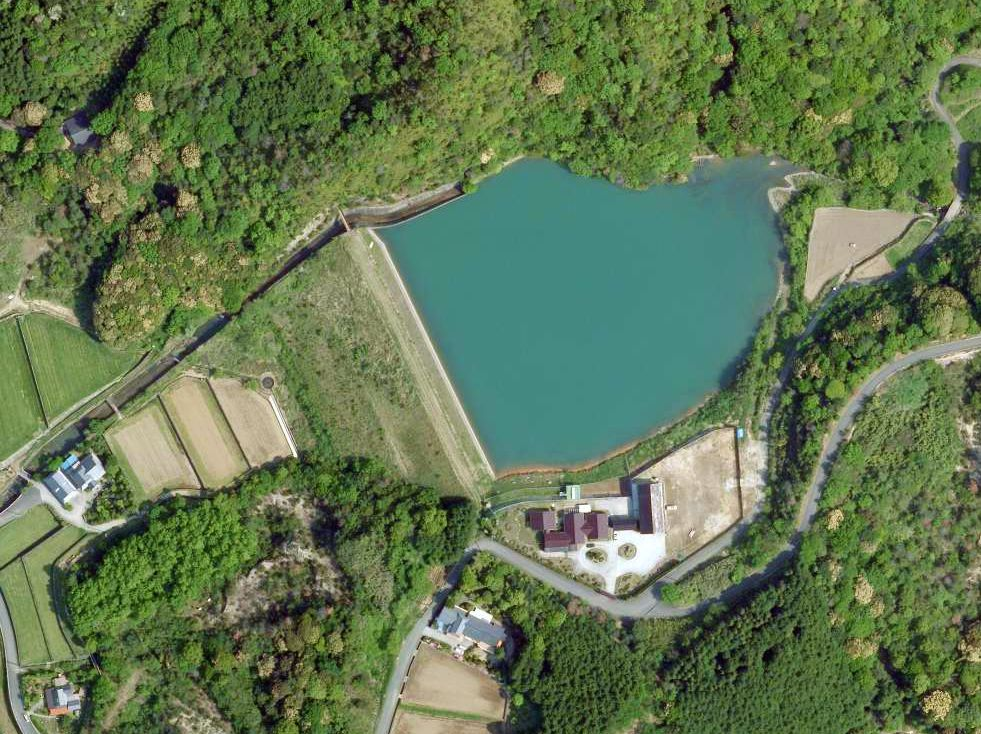

- Location within Japan
- Interactive map of Benjo Dam
- Location: Fukuoka Prefecture, Japan
- Coordinates: 33°42′59″N 130°47′38″E
- Opening date: 1966

Dam and spillways
- Height: 23.1 m (76 ft)
- Length: 151 m (495 ft)

Reservoir
- Total capacity: 208 thousand cubic meters
- Catchment area: 2.5 sq. km
- Surface area: 2 hectares

Benjo Dam is an earthfill dam located in Fukuoka Prefecture in Japan. The dam is used for irrigation. The catchment area of the dam is 2.5 km^{2}. The dam impounds about 2 ha of land when full and can store 208 thousand cubic meters of water. The construction of the dam was completed in 1966.
