= Nanase Dam =

Ōitagawa Dam
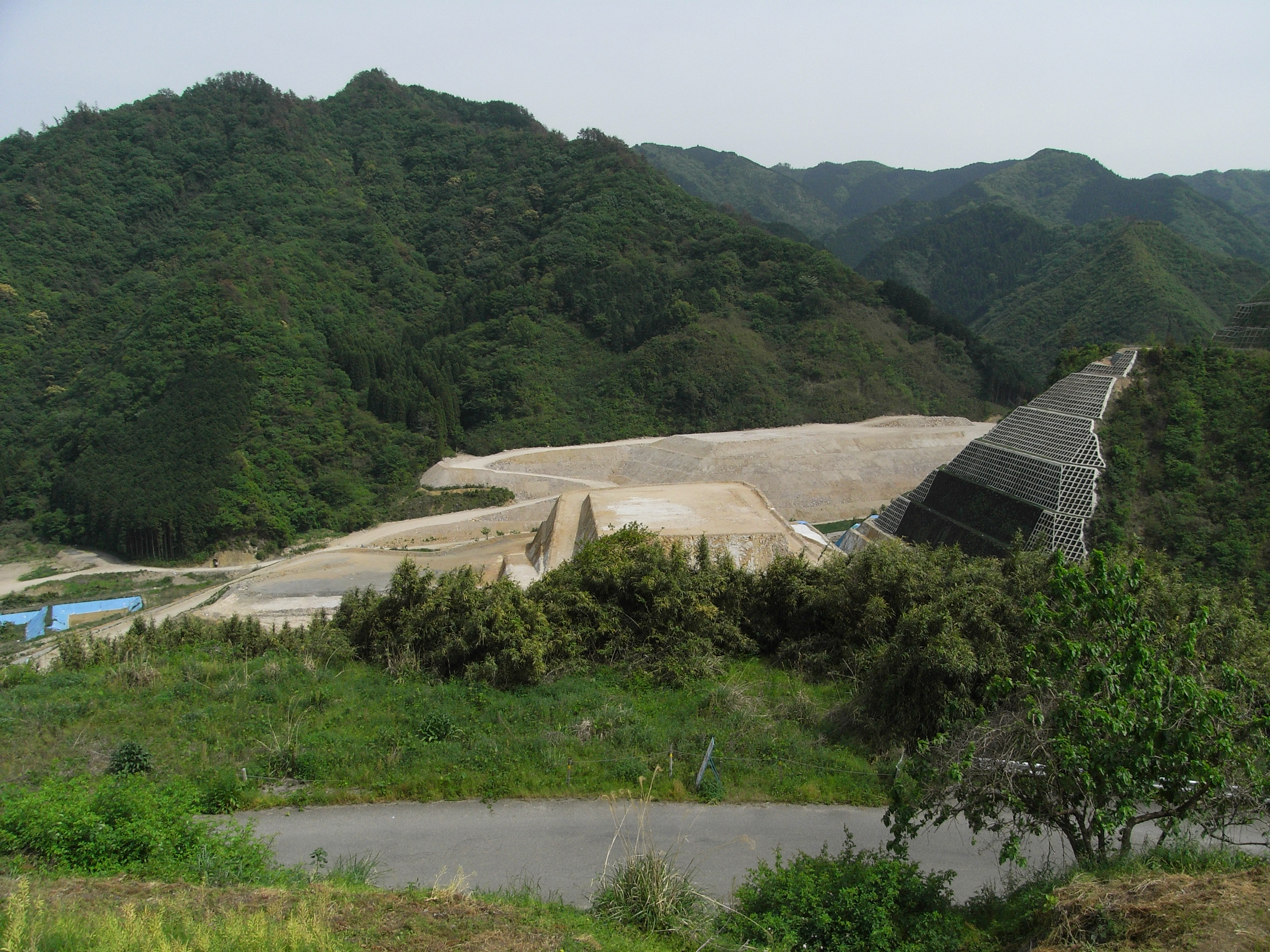
- Country: Japan
- Location: Ōita Prefecture
- Coordinates: 33°7′36″N 131°29′49″W
- Purpose: Flood control
- Construction began: 1978
- Opening date: 2020

Dam and spillways
- Height: 85.5 m
- Length: 515 m
- Dam volume: 4.16 million m^{3}

Reservoir
- Total capacity: 25.9 million m^{3}
- Catchment area: 38 km^{2}
- Surface area: 1.1 km^{2}

Nanase Dam is a dam in the Ōita Prefecture, Japan, and was completed in 2020. It is mainly dedicated to flood control and has a retention capacity of 25.9 million cubic meters of water. Previously known as Oitagawa Dam, but was renamed after its completion.
