= Kitagawa Dam =

Coordinates: 32°47′26″N 131°36′28″E

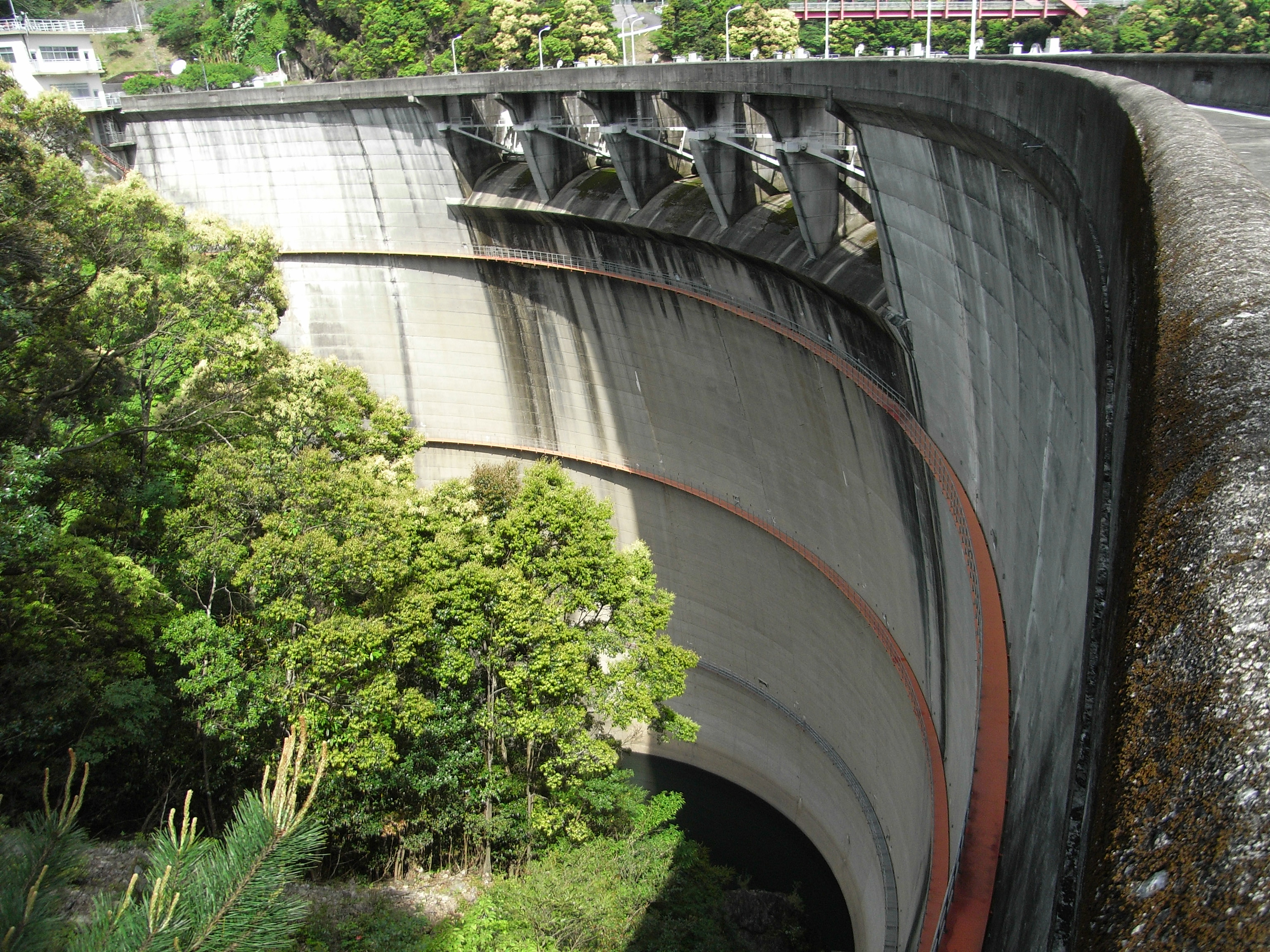
- Interactive map of Kitagawa Dam
- Location: Ōita Prefecture, Japan
- Construction began: 1958
- Opening date: 1962
- Operator: Ōita Prefecture

Dam and spillways
- Type of dam: Concrete arch dam
- Height: 82.0 m (269.0 ft)
- Length: 188.3 m (618 ft)
- Dam volume: 66,000 m³

Reservoir
- Catchment area: 211.0 km²
- Surface area: 200.0 ha

Power Station
- Annual generation: 25,100kW

Kitagawa Dam (Japanese: 北川ダム) is a dam in the Saiki, Ōita, Japan, completed in 1962. It spans the Kita River, a class A river, in the Gokase River drainage system. It is managed by Ōita Prefecture, and it is an 82.0-meter-tall (269.0 ft) concrete arch dam. It is the largest dam in the Gokase River drainage system, and it was built with government subsidies with the goal of flood control and hydroelectric power generation for the Kita River basin. The man-made lake formed by the dam is the largest such reservoir of any dam administered by the prefecture, but it is simply called the Kitagawa Dam Lake and has no nickname. Despite that in 2005 it was selected by the Dam Waters Environment Development Center Foundation as one of the top one hundred reservoirs.

== Summary ==
The Kita River originates in Ōita Prefecture and flows into the Sea of Hyūga off Miyagi Prefecture after joining its tributary Nakadake River, and along the way flows close to the border of the two prefectures, and Kitagawa Dam, built to dam this river, was the first concrete arch dam in Ōita Prefecture. According to Ōita Electric Power Department, the dam was built to be a multipurpose dam for flood control and power generation, and the height of the headwaters was low at 285 meters, and to function in the Kita River which has a narrow grade, the dam functions with an unusually narrow height difference.

The portion of Kita River upstream of where Nakadake River joins it is known as Tashiro River. A stone arched bridge built across the Tashiro River in 1908, directly upstream of where the rivers merge, is submerged in the reservoir. The stone bridge is 10 meters from the bottom of the lake, so it is visible only from the summer dry season until the reservoir becomes full when the rainy season starts or a typhoon comes.

Kitagawa Dam's reservoir has been chosen as one of the top 100 reservoirs. On the left bank of the reservoir is Japan National Route 326, the spot where the Nakadake River tributary flows into Kita River has a local folk song called "Ume no Utagenka", and the Utagenka Bridge located there is connected to that song, and in the vicinity of the bridge is the Ume Rest Area. The vicinity of the dam is the natural habitat of the mountain hawk-eagle, and in 1981 the prefecture designated it as a protected wildlife area.
