= Zenzo Tameike Dam =

Dam in Fukuoka Prefecture, Japan

Zenzo Tameike
- Location within Japan
- Location: Fukuoka Prefecture, Japan
- Coordinates: 33°11′29″N 130°41′47″E
- Opening date: 1927

Dam and spillways
- Height: 19 m (62 ft)
- Length: 90 m (300 ft)

Reservoir
- Total capacity: 249,000 m^{3} (8,800,000 cu ft)
- Catchment area: 0.8 km^{2} (0.31 sq mi)
- Surface area: 2 hectares (4.9 acres)

Zenzo Tameike is an earthfill dam located in Fukuoka Prefecture in Japan. The dam is used for irrigation. The catchment area of the dam is 0.8 km^{2}. The dam impounds about 2 ha of land when full and can store 249 thousand cubic meters of water. The construction of the dam was completed in 1927.
