= Sehuri Dam =

Dam in Fukuoka Prefecture, Japan

- Location within Japan
- Location: Fukuoka Prefecture, Japan
- Coordinates: 33°26′07″N 130°23′46″E
- Construction began: 1970
- Opening date: 1976

Dam and spillways
- Height: 43 m (141 ft)
- Length: 240 m (790 ft)

Reservoir
- Total capacity: 4,500,000 m^{3} (160,000,000 cu ft)
- Catchment area: 5.5 km^{2} (2.1 sq mi)
- Surface area: 32 hectares (79 acres)

Sehuri Dam is a rockfill dam located in Fukuoka Prefecture in Japan. The dam is used for water supply. The catchment area of the dam is 5.5 km^{2}. The dam impounds about 32 ha of land when full and can store 4500 thousand cubic meters of water. The construction of the dam was started on 1970 and completed in 1976.
