= Fukuchiyama Dam =

Dam in Fukuoka Prefecture, Japan

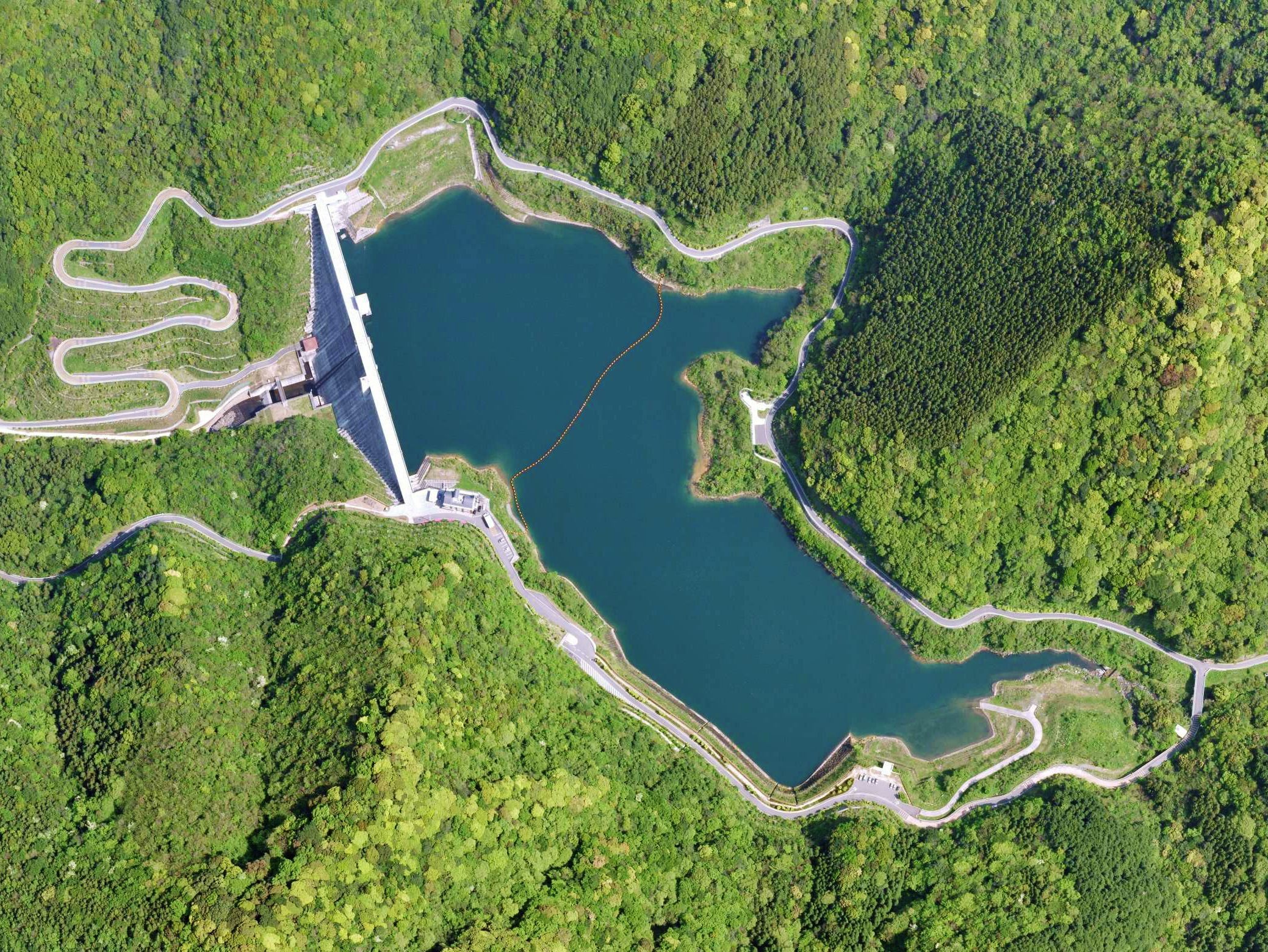

- Location within Japan
- Interactive map of Fukuchiyama Dam
- Location: Fukuoka Prefecture, Japan
- Coordinates: 33°45′24″N 130°47′00″E
- Construction began: 1975
- Opening date: 2003

Dam and spillways
- Height: 64.5 m (212 ft)
- Length: 255 m (837 ft)

Reservoir
- Total capacity: 2710 thousand cubic meters
- Catchment area: 4.7 sq. km
- Surface area: 13 hectares

Fukuchiyama Dam is a gravity dam located in Fukuoka Prefecture in Japan. The dam is used for flood control and water supply. The catchment area of the dam is 4.7 km^{2}. The dam impounds about 13 ha of land when full and can store 2710 thousand cubic meters of water. The construction of the dam was started on 1975 and completed in 2003.
