= Fujinami Dam =

Dam in Fukuoka Prefecture, Japan

- Location within Japan
- Interactive map of Fujinami Dam
- Location: Fukuoka Prefecture, Japan
- Coordinates: 33°18′58″N 130°47′22″E
- Construction began: 1970
- Opening date: 2009

Dam and spillways
- Height: 52 m (171 ft)
- Length: 295 m (968 ft)

Reservoir
- Total capacity: 2950 thousand cubic meters
- Catchment area: 21.7 sq. km
- Surface area: 21 hectares

Fujinami Dam is a rockfill dam located in Fukuoka Prefecture in Japan. The dam is used for flood control. The catchment area of the dam is 21.7 km^{2}. The dam impounds about 21 ha of land when full and can store 2950 thousand cubic meters of water. The construction of the dam was started on 1970 and completed in 2009.
