= Fudo-ike Dam =

Dam in Fukuoka Prefecture, Japan

Fudo-ike
- Location within Japan
- Interactive map of Fudo-ike
- Location: Fukuoka Prefecture, Japan
- Coordinates: 33°29′51″N 130°13′04″E
- Opening date: 1936

Dam and spillways
- Height: 17 m (56 ft)
- Length: 93 m (305 ft)

Reservoir
- Total capacity: 230 thousand cubic meters
- Catchment area: sq. km
- Surface area: 2 hectares

Fudo-ike is an earthfill dam located in Fukuoka Prefecture in Japan. The dam is used for irrigation. The catchment area of the dam is km^{2}. The dam impounds about 2 ha of land when full and can store 230 thousand cubic meters of water. The construction of the dam was completed in 1936.
