= Ohi Dam =

Dam in Fukuoka Prefecture, Japan

- Location within Japan
- Location: Fukuoka Prefecture, Japan
- Coordinates: 33°47′55″N 130°31′11″E
- Construction began: 1977
- Opening date: 1978

Dam and spillways
- Height: 19 m (62 ft)
- Length: 206 m (676 ft)

Reservoir
- Total capacity: 1,252,000 m^{3} (44,200,000 cu ft)
- Catchment area: 4.2 km^{2} (1.6 sq mi)
- Surface area: 18 hectares (44 acres)

Ohi Dam is an earthfill dam located in Fukuoka Prefecture in Japan. The dam is used for irrigation. The catchment area of the dam is 4.2 km^{2}. The dam impounds about 18 ha of land when full and can store 1252 thousand cubic meters of water. The construction of the dam was started on 1977 and completed in 1978.
