= Taisho-ike Dam (Fukuoka) =

Dam in Fukuoka Prefecture, Japan

- Location within Japan
- Location: Fukuoka Prefecture, Japan
- Coordinates: 33°39′09″N 130°57′50″E
- Opening date: 1915

Dam and spillways
- Height: 17.2 m (56 ft)
- Length: 138 m (453 ft)

Reservoir
- Total capacity: 270,000 m^{3} (9,500,000 cu ft)
- Catchment area: 0.5 km^{2} (0.19 sq mi)
- Surface area: 3 hectares (7.4 acres)

Taisho-ike Dam is an earthfill dam located in Fukuoka Prefecture in Japan. The dam is used for irrigation. The catchment area of the dam is 0.5 km^{2}. The dam impounds about 3 ha of land when full and can store 270 thousand cubic meters of water. The construction of the dam was completed in 1915.
