= Kirihata Dam =

Dam in Fukuoka Prefecture, Japan

- Location within Japan
- Location: Fukuoka Prefecture, Japan
- Coordinates: 33°34′37″N 130°36′21″E
- Opening date: 1975

Dam and spillways
- Height: 38 m (125 ft)
- Length: 140.4 m (461 ft)

Reservoir
- Total capacity: 361 thousand cubic meters
- Catchment area: 2.2 sq. km
- Surface area: 4 hectares

Kirihata Dam is an earthfill dam located in Fukuoka Prefecture in Japan. The dam is used for irrigation. The catchment area of the dam is 2.2 km^{2}. The dam impounds about 4 hectares (9.9 acres) of land when full and can store 361 thousand cubic meters of water. The construction of the dam was completed in 1975.
