= Honnyu Tameike Dam =

Dam in Fukuoka Prefecture, Japan

- Location within Japan
- Interactive map of Honnyu Tameike Dam
- Location: Fukuoka Prefecture, Japan
- Coordinates: 33°41′46″N 130°40′52″E
- Opening date: 1917

Dam and spillways
- Height: 15 m (49 ft)
- Length: 70 m (230 ft)

Reservoir
- Total capacity: 600 thousand cubic meters
- Catchment area: 1.6 sq. km
- Surface area: 10 hectares

Honnyu Tameike Dam is an earthfill dam located in Fukuoka Prefecture in Japan. The dam is used for irrigation. The catchment area of the dam is 1.6 km^{2}. The dam impounds about 10 ha of land when full and can store 600 thousand cubic meters of water. The construction of the dam was completed in 1917.
