= Ohzano Dam =

Dam in Fukuoka Prefecture, Japan

- Location within Japan
- Location: Fukuoka Prefecture, Japan
- Coordinates: 33°29′26″N 130°29′18″E
- Construction began: 1970
- Opening date: 1974

Dam and spillways
- Height: 25.5 m (84 ft)
- Length: 77.5 m (254 ft)

Reservoir
- Total capacity: 195,000 m^{3} (6,900,000 cu ft)
- Catchment area: 1.3 km^{2} (0.50 sq mi)
- Surface area: 3 hectares (7.4 acres)

Ohzano Dam is an earthfill dam located in Fukuoka Prefecture in Japan. The dam is used for water supply. The catchment area of the dam is 1.3 km^{2}. The dam impounds about 3 ha of land when full and can store 195 thousand cubic meters of water. The construction of the dam was started on 1970 and completed in 1974.
