= Terauchi Dam =

Dam in Fukuoka Prefecture, Japan

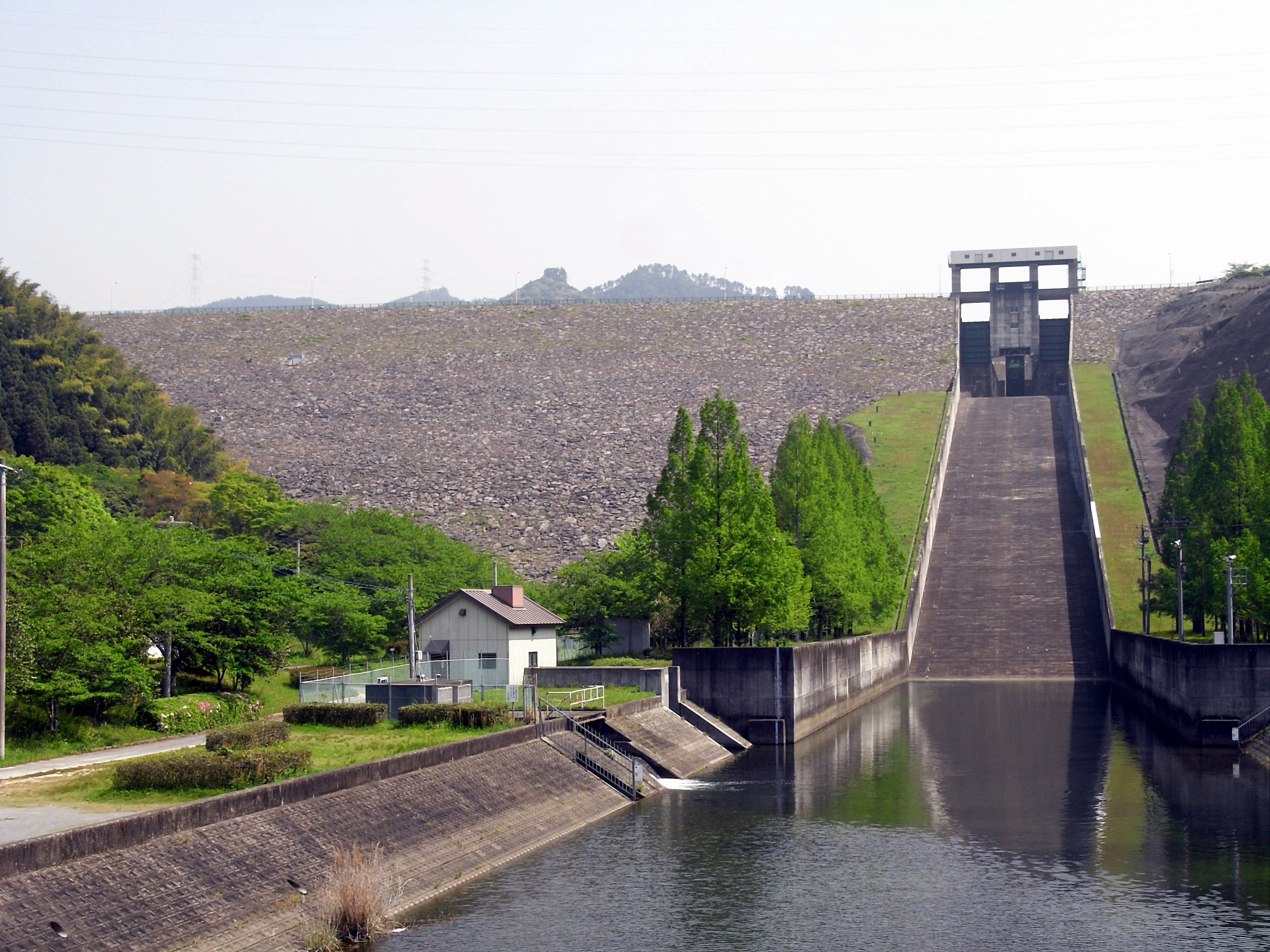
- Interactive map of Terauchi Dam
- Location: Fukuoka Prefecture, Japan.
- Coordinates: 33°25′43″N 130°43′23″E
- Construction began: 1970
- Opening date: 1978

Dam and spillways
- Impounds: Sadagawa River
- Height: 83 m
- Length: 420 m

Reservoir
- Total capacity: 18,000,000 m^{3}
- Catchment area: 51 km^{2}
- Surface area: 90 hectares

Terauchi Dam is a dam in the Fukuoka Prefecture of Japan.
