= Hirokawa Bosai Dam =

Dam in Fukuoka Prefecture, Japan

- Location within Japan
- Interactive map of Hirokawa Bosai Dam
- Location: Fukuoka Prefecture, Japan
- Coordinates: 33°14′31″N 130°37′01″E
- Opening date: 1972

Dam and spillways
- Height: 30.4 m (100 ft)
- Length: 132.1 m (433 ft)

Reservoir
- Total capacity: 990 thousand cubic meters
- Catchment area: 9.4 sq. km
- Surface area: 12 hectares

Hirokawa Bosai Dam is a rockfill dam located in Fukuoka Prefecture in Japan. The dam is used for flood control and irrigation. The catchment area of the dam is 9.4 km^{2}. The dam impounds about 12 ha of land when full and can store 990 thousand cubic meters of water. The construction of the dam was completed in 1972.
