= Tonogawa Dam =

Dam in Kagawa Prefecture, Japan

- Location within Japan
- Official name: 殿川ダム
- Location: Kagawa Prefecture, Japan
- Coordinates: 34°30′07″N 134°14′52″E
- Construction began: 1967
- Opening date: 1974

Dam and spillways
- Height: 35.6 m (117 ft)
- Length: 192 m (630 ft)

Reservoir
- Total capacity: 690,000 m^{3} (24,000,000 cu ft)
- Catchment area: 5.6 km^{2} (2.2 sq mi)
- Surface area: 6 hectares (15 acres)

Tonogawa Dam (Japanese: 殿川ダム) is a gravity dam located in Kagawa Prefecture in Japan. The dam is used for flood control and water supply. The catchment area of the dam is 5.6 km^{2}. The dam impounds about 6 ha of land when full and can store 690 thousand cubic meters of water. The construction of the dam was started on 1967 and completed in 1974.

== See also ==
- List of dams in Japan
