= Raizan Oh-tameike Dam =

Dam in Fukuoka Prefecture, Japan

- Location within Japan
- Location: Fukuoka Prefecture, Japan
- Coordinates: 33°31′47″N 130°13′02″E
- Opening date: 1944

Dam and spillways
- Height: 25 m (82 ft)
- Length: 230 m (750 ft)

Reservoir
- Total capacity: 1,200,000 m^{3} (42,000,000 cu ft)
- Catchment area: sq. km
- Surface area: 20 hectares (49 acres)

Raizan Oh-tameike Dam is an earthfill dam located in Fukuoka Prefecture in Japan. The dam is used for irrigation. The catchment area of the dam is km^{2}. The dam impounds about 20 ha of land when full and can store 1200 thousand cubic meters of water. The construction of the dam was started on and completed in 1944.
