= Taisho-ike Dam (Hokkaido) =

Dam in Hokkaido Prefecture, Japan

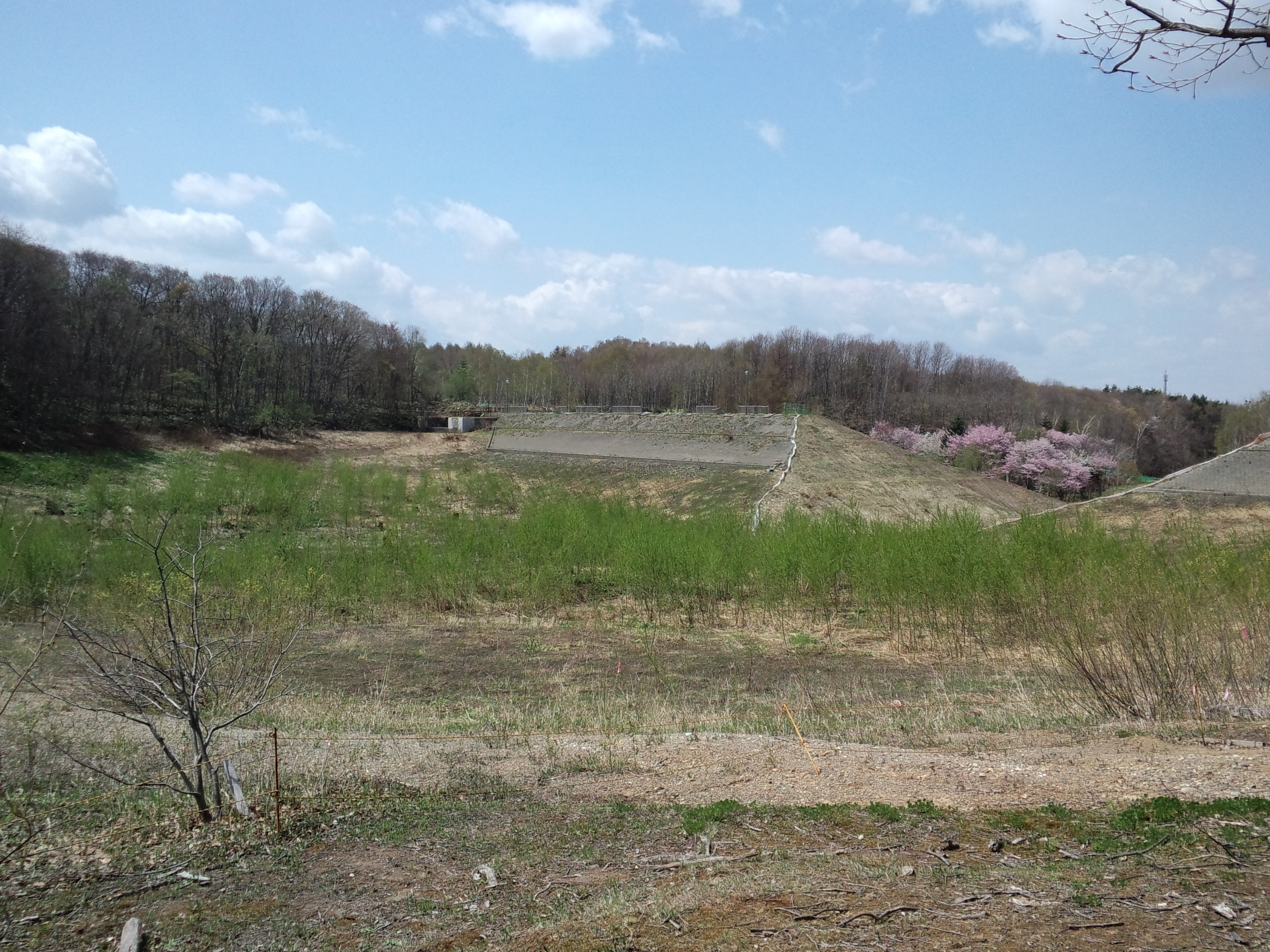

- Location within Japan
- Location: Hokkaido Prefecture, Japan
- Coordinates: 43°10′52″N 141°46′54″E
- Opening date: 1914

Dam and spillways
- Height: 15.9 m (52 ft)
- Length: 232 m (761 ft)

Reservoir
- Total capacity: 489,000 m^{3} (17,300,000 cu ft)
- Catchment area: 1.3 km^{2} (0.50 sq mi)
- Surface area: 8 hectares (20 acres)

Taisho-ike Dam (Japanese: 大正池) is an earthfill dam located in Hokkaido Prefecture in Japan. The dam is used for irrigation. The catchment area of the dam is 1.3 km^{2}. The dam impounds about 8 ha of land when full and can store 489 thousand cubic meters of water. The construction of the dam was completed in 1914.
