= Honjo-ike Fukutei No.1 Dam =

Dam in Fukuoka Prefecture, Japan

- Location within Japan
- Interactive map of Honjo-ike Fukutei No.1 Dam
- Location: Fukuoka Prefecture, Japan
- Coordinates: 33°38′31″N 130°56′17″E
- Opening date: 1948

Dam and spillways
- Height: 16.2 m (53 ft)
- Length: 89 m (292 ft)

Reservoir
- Total capacity: 1539 thousand cubic meters
- Catchment area: 8.5 sq. km
- Surface area: 19 hectares

Honjo-ike Fukutei No.1 Dam is an earthfill dam located in Fukuoka Prefecture in Japan. The dam is used for irrigation. The catchment area of the dam is 8.5 km^{2}. The dam impounds about 19 ha of land when full and can store 1539 thousand cubic meters of water. The construction of the dam was completed in 1948.
