= Matsugae Dam =

Dam in Fukuoka Prefecture, Japan

- Location within Japan
- Location: Fukuoka Prefecture, Japan
- Coordinates: 33°52′49″N 130°57′55″E
- Construction began: 1957
- Opening date: 1960

Dam and spillways
- Height: 47 m (154 ft)
- Length: 205 m (673 ft)

Reservoir
- Total capacity: 1579 thousand cubic meters
- Catchment area: 2.8 sq. km
- Surface area: 10 hectares

Matsugae Dam is a gravity dam located in Fukuoka Prefecture in Japan. The dam is used for water supply. The catchment area of the dam is 2.8 km^{2}. The dam impounds about 10 ha of land when full and can store 1579 thousand cubic meters of water. The construction of the dam was started on 1957 and completed in 1960.
