= Yagatako-ike Dam =

Dam in Fukuoka Prefecture, Japan

Yagatako-ike
- Location within Japan
- Location: Fukuoka Prefecture, Japan
- Coordinates: 33°34′24″N 131°7′57″E
- Opening date: 1959

Dam and spillways
- Height: 19 m (62 ft)
- Length: 207 m (679 ft)

Reservoir
- Total capacity: 610,000 m^{3} (22,000,000 cu ft)
- Catchment area: sq. km
- Surface area: 7 hectares (17 acres)

Yagatako-ike is an earthfill dam located in Fukuoka Prefecture in Japan. The dam is used for irrigation. The catchment area of the dam is km^{2}. The dam impounds about 7 ha of land when full and can store 610 thousand cubic meters of water. The construction of the dam was completed in 1959.
