= Honjo-ike-hontei Dam =

Dam in Fukuoka Prefecture, Japan

- Location within Japan
- Interactive map of Honjo-ike-hontei Dam
- Location: Fukuoka Prefecture, Japan
- Coordinates: 33°38′27″N 130°56′31″E
- Opening date: 1946

Dam and spillways
- Height: 19.2 m (63 ft)
- Length: 429 m (1,407 ft)

Reservoir
- Total capacity: 1600 thousand cubic meters
- Catchment area: 0.4 sq. km
- Surface area: 19 hectares

Honjo-ike-hontei Dam is an earthfill dam located in Fukuoka Prefecture in Japan. The dam is used for irrigation. The catchment area of the dam is 0.4 km^{2}. The dam impounds about 19 ha of land when full and can store 1600 thousand cubic meters of water. The construction of the dam was completed in 1946.
