= Yoshida Dam =

Dam in Fukuoka Prefecture, Japan

- Location within Japan
- Location: Fukuoka Prefecture, Japan
- Coordinates: 33°50′16″N 130°31′43″E
- Construction began: 1977
- Opening date: 1983

Dam and spillways
- Height: 24 m (79 ft)
- Length: 217 m (712 ft)

Reservoir
- Total capacity: 877,000 m^{3} (31,000,000 cu ft)
- Catchment area: 0.6 km^{2} (0.23 sq mi)
- Surface area: 13 hectares (32 acres)

Yoshida Dam is a rockfill dam located in Fukuoka Prefecture in Japan. The dam is used for water supply. The catchment area of the dam is 0.6 km^{2}. The dam impounds about 13 hectares (32 acres) of land when full and can store 877 thousand cubic meters of water. The construction of the dam was started on 1977 and completed in 1983.
