= Fukuchiyama-ike Dam =

Dam in Fukuoka Prefecture, Japan

- Location within Japan
- Interactive map of Fukuchiyama-ike Dam
- Location: Fukuoka Prefecture, Japan
- Coordinates: 33°45′10″N 130°46′18″E
- Opening date: 1953

Dam and spillways
- Height: 22 m (72 ft)
- Length: 112.6 m (369 ft)

Reservoir
- Total capacity: 416 thousand cubic meters
- Catchment area: 5.9 sq. km
- Surface area: 6 hectares

Fukuchiyama-ike Dam is an earthfill dam located in Fukuoka Prefecture in Japan. The dam is used for irrigation. The catchment area of the dam is 5.9 km^{2}. The dam impounds about 6 ha of land when full and can store 416 thousand cubic meters of water. The construction of the dam was completed in 1953.
