= Honjo-ike Fukutei No.2 Dam =

Dam in Fukuoka Prefecture, Japan

- Location within Japan
- Interactive map of Honjo-ike Fukutei No.2 Dam
- Location: Fukuoka Prefecture, Japan
- Coordinates: 33°38′19″N 130°56′13″E
- Opening date: 1946

Dam and spillways
- Height: 16.7 m (55 ft)
- Length: 91 m (299 ft)

Reservoir
- Total capacity: 1539 thousand cubic meters
- Catchment area: 8.5 sq. km
- Surface area: 19 hectares

Honjo-ike Fukutei No.2 Dam is an earthfill dam located in Fukuoka Prefecture in Japan. The dam is used for irrigation with catchment area of 8.5 km^{2}. The dam impounds about 19 ha of land when full and can store 1539 thousand cubic meters of water. The construction of the dam was completed in 1946.
