= Kasagi Dam (Gifu) =

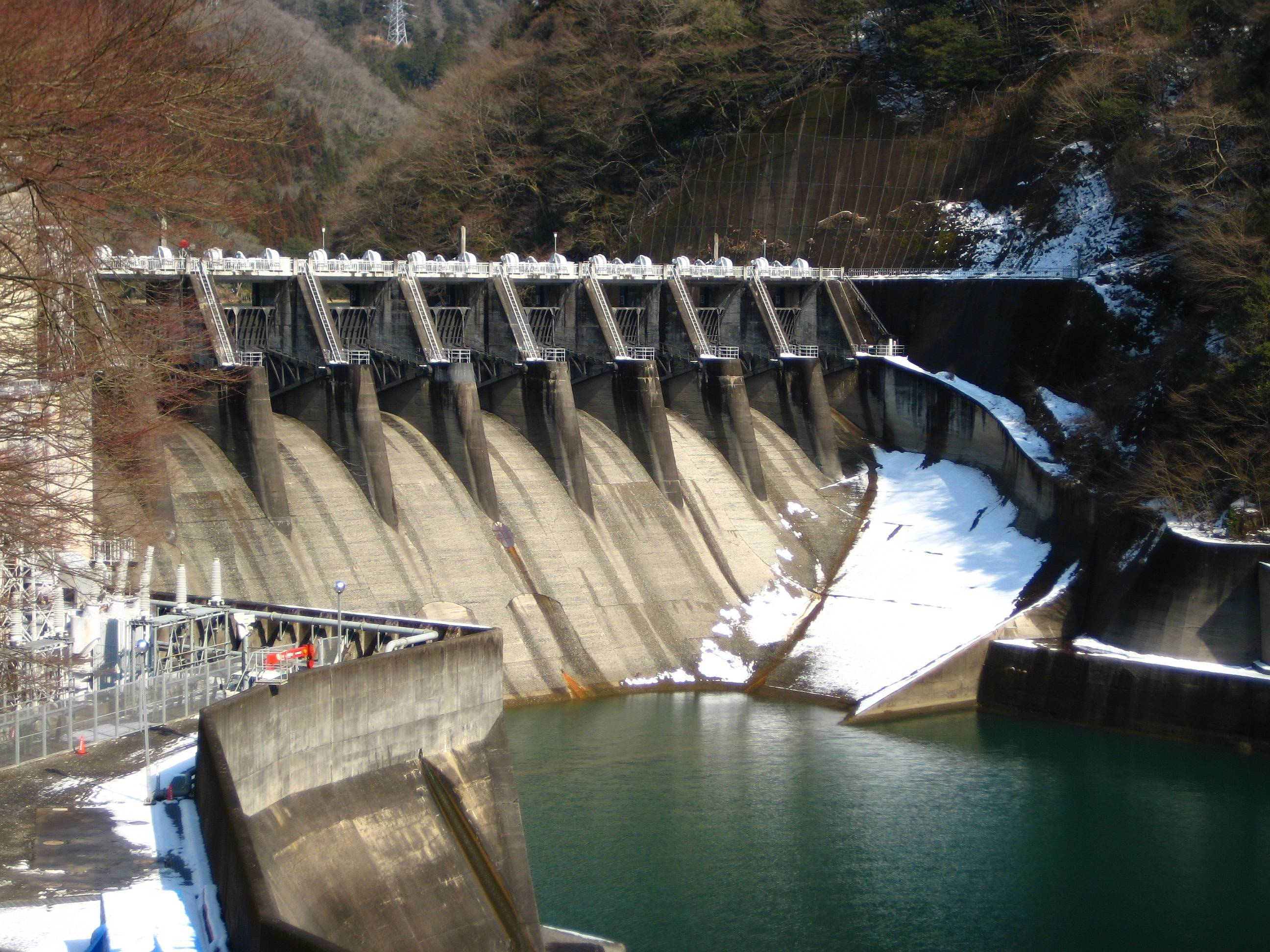
- Interactive map of Kasagi Dam
- Location: Gifu Prefecture, Japan
- Coordinates: 35°27′35″N 137°17′39″E
- Construction began: 1934
- Opening date: 1936

Dam and spillways
- Impounds: Kiso River
- Height: 40.8 m
- Length: 154.9 m

Reservoir
- Total capacity: 14,121,000 m^{3}
- Catchment area: 2301.2 km^{2}
- Surface area: 109 hectares

Kasagi Dam (笠置ダム, Kasagi damu) is a dam in the Gifu Prefecture of Japan. Construction of the dam was completed by 1936. Its height is 40.8m and its maximum power output (from the power plant) is 41,700 kW.

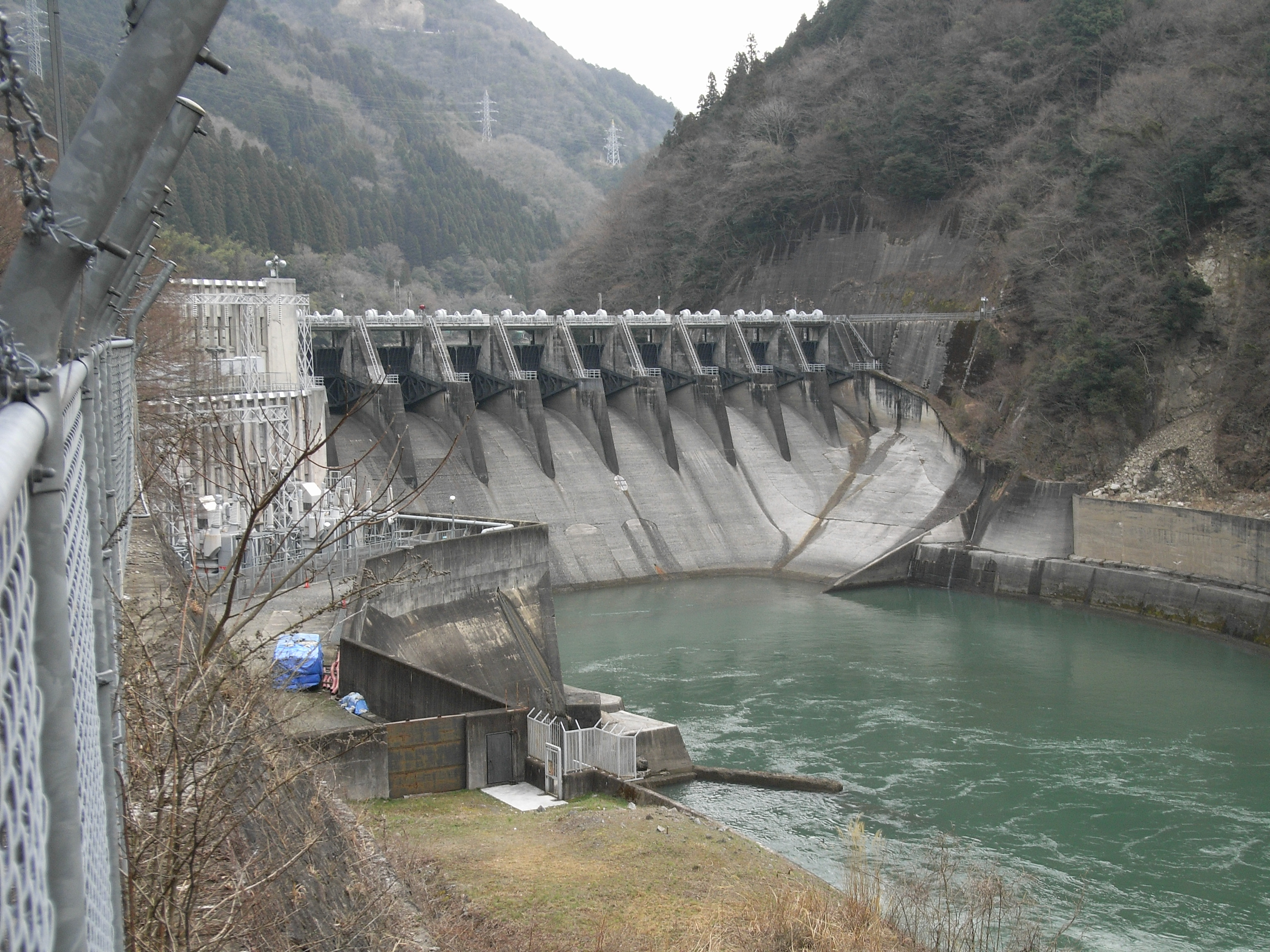

== See also ==
- Dams in Japan
- Energy in Japan
