= Hisashi Dam =

Coordinates: 33°26′14″N 131°25′59″E

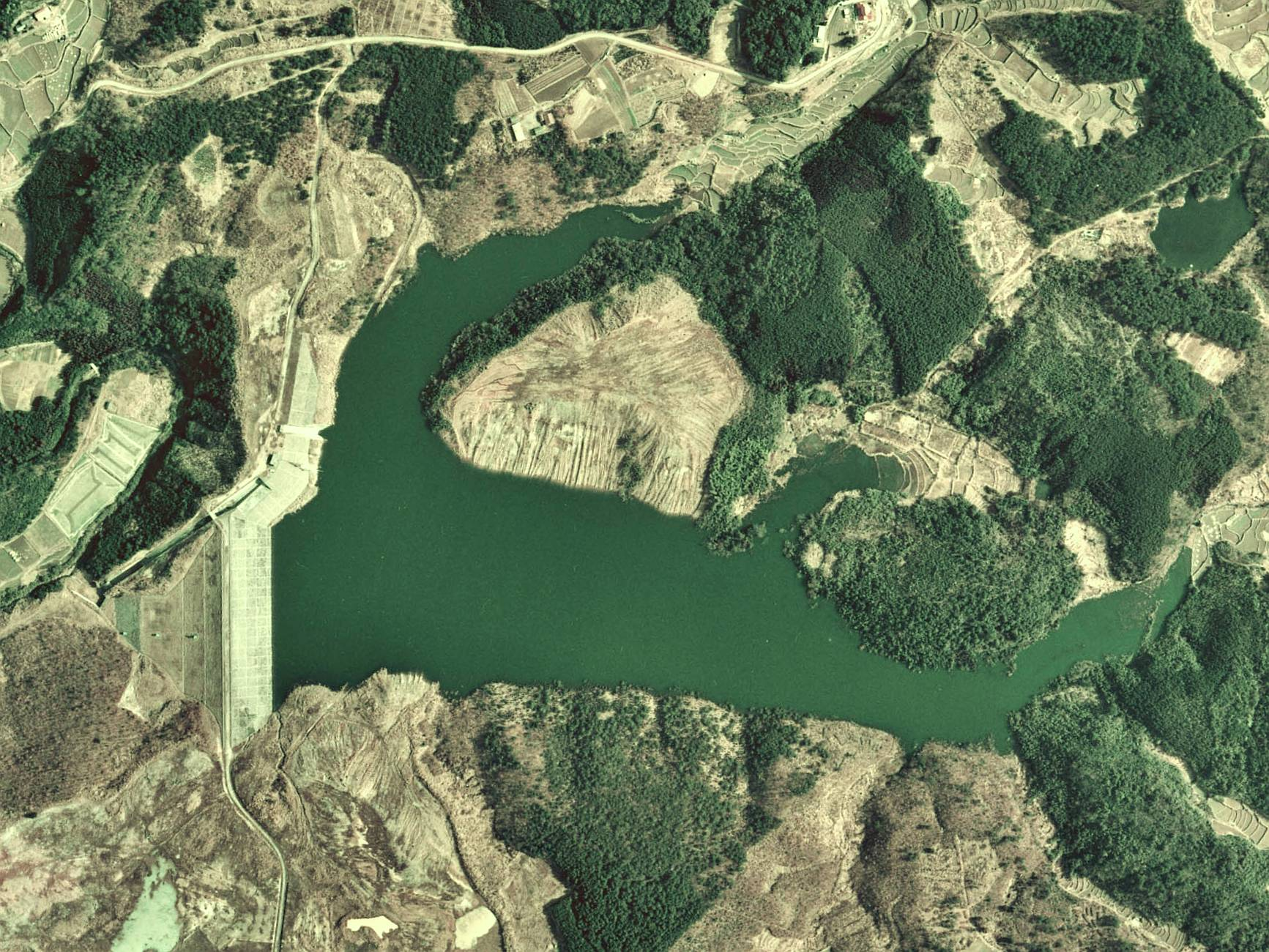
- Interactive map of Hisashi Dam
- Location: Ōita Prefecture, Japan
- Construction began: 1964
- Opening date: 1979

Hisashi Dam (Japanese: 日指ダム) is a dam in the Ōita Prefecture, Japan, completed in 1979. It is an embankment dam with the water used for irrigation and industry. The dam is 40 metres high and retains 4,800,000 m^{3} of water over a 263-metre crest length. The volume of the dam is 431,000 m^{3} and the surface area of Lake Hisashi is 370,000 m^{2}.
