= Gousho Dam =

Coordinates: 33°18′56″N 130°48′09″E

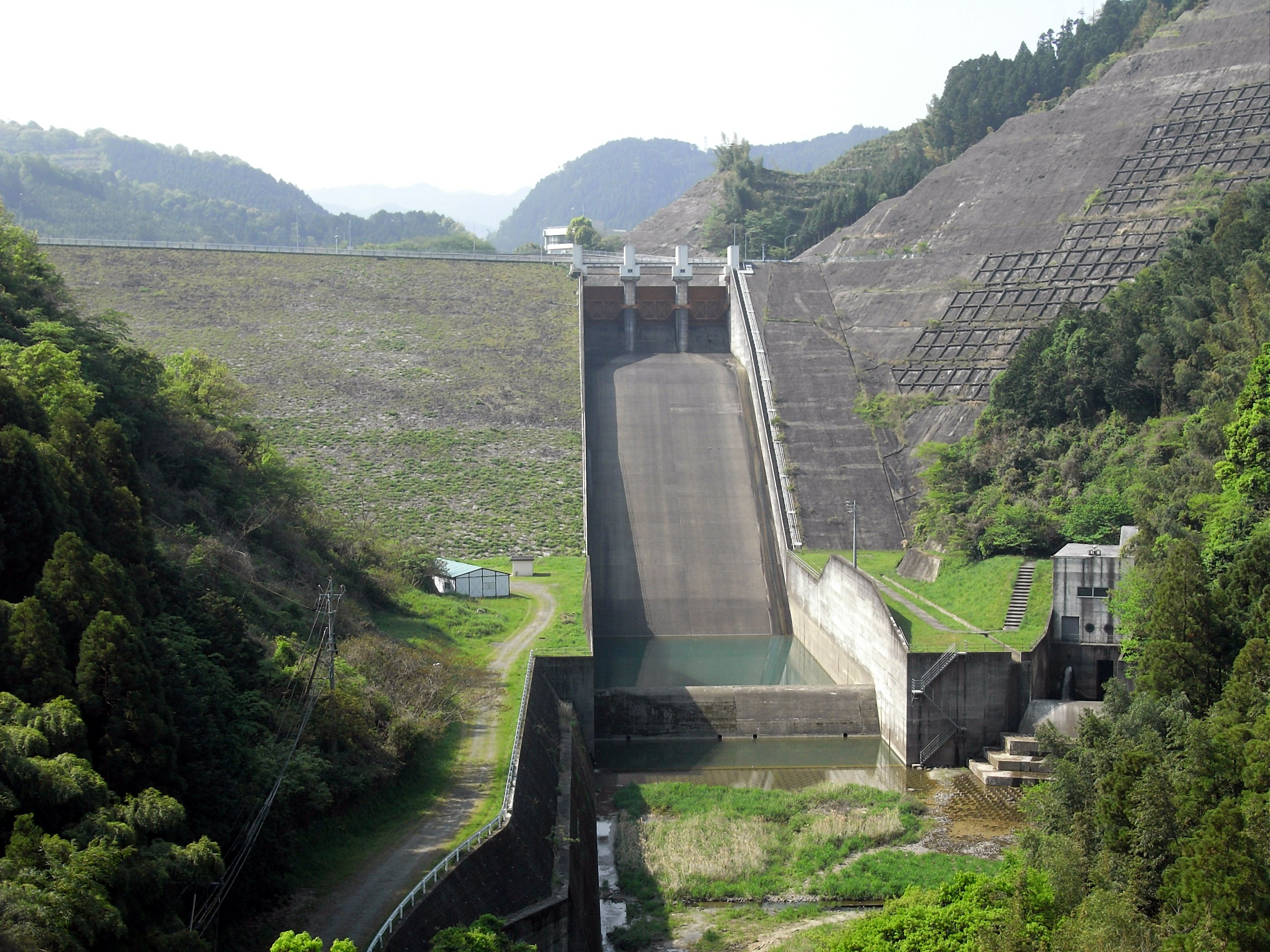
- Location: Ukiha, Fukuoka, Japan
- Construction began: 1972
- Opening date: 1990

Dam and spillways
- Impounds: Koishiharagawa River
- Height: 60.7 m
- Length: 270.0 m

Reservoir
- Total capacity: 7,660,000 m^{3}
- Catchment area: 42.0 km^{2}
- Surface area: 38 hectares

Gousho Dam (合所ダム, Gōsho damu) is a dam in Ukiha, Fukuoka Prefecture, Japan.
