= Tare Dam =

Dam in Fukuoka Prefecture, Japan

- Location within Japan
- Location: Fukuoka Prefecture, Japan
- Coordinates: 33°49′18″N 130°31′45″E
- Construction began: 1977
- Opening date: 1983

Dam and spillways
- Height: 27.5 m (90 ft)
- Length: 191 m (627 ft)

Reservoir
- Total capacity: 1,205,000 m^{3} (42,600,000 cu ft)
- Catchment area: 1.1 km^{2} (0.42 sq mi)
- Surface area: 24 hectares (59 acres)

Tare Dam is a rockfill dam located in Fukuoka Prefecture in Japan. The dam is used for water supply. The catchment area of the dam is 1.1 km^{2}. The dam impounds about 24 ha of land when full and can store 1205 thousand cubic meters of water. The construction of the dam was started on 1977 and completed in 1983.
