= Zuibaiji Dam =

Dam in Fukuoka Prefecture, Japan

- Location within Japan
- Location: Fukuoka Prefecture, Japan
- Coordinates: 33°30′13″N 130°14′51″E
- Construction began: 1969
- Opening date: 1977

Dam and spillways
- Height: 64 m (210 ft)
- Length: 337.5 m (1,107 ft)

Reservoir
- Total capacity: 2,420,000 m^{3} (85,000,000 cu ft)
- Catchment area: 7.2 km^{2} (2.8 sq mi)
- Surface area: 12 hectares (30 acres)

Zuibaiji Dam is a gravity dam located in Fukuoka Prefecture in Japan. The dam is used for flood control and water supply. The catchment area of the dam is 7.2 km^{2}. The dam impounds about 12 ha of land when full and can store 2420 thousand cubic meters of water. The construction of the dam was started on 1969 and completed in 1977.
