= Shobudani Dam =

Dam in Fukuoka Prefecture, Japan

- Location within Japan
- Location: Fukuoka Prefecture, Japan
- Coordinates: 33°54′35″N 130°46′56″E
- Construction began: 1920
- Opening date: 1924

Dam and spillways
- Height: 18 m (59 ft)
- Length: 140.4 m (461 ft)

Reservoir
- Total capacity: 264,000 m^{3} (9,300,000 cu ft)
- Catchment area: 1.6 km^{2} (0.62 sq mi)
- Surface area: 3 hectares (7.4 acres)

Shobudani Dam is an earthfill dam located in Fukuoka Prefecture in Japan. The dam is used for water supply. The catchment area of the dam is 1.6 km^{2}. The dam impounds about 3 ha of land when full and can store 264 thousand cubic meters of water. The construction of the dam was started on 1920 and completed in 1924.
