= Onagohata Dam =

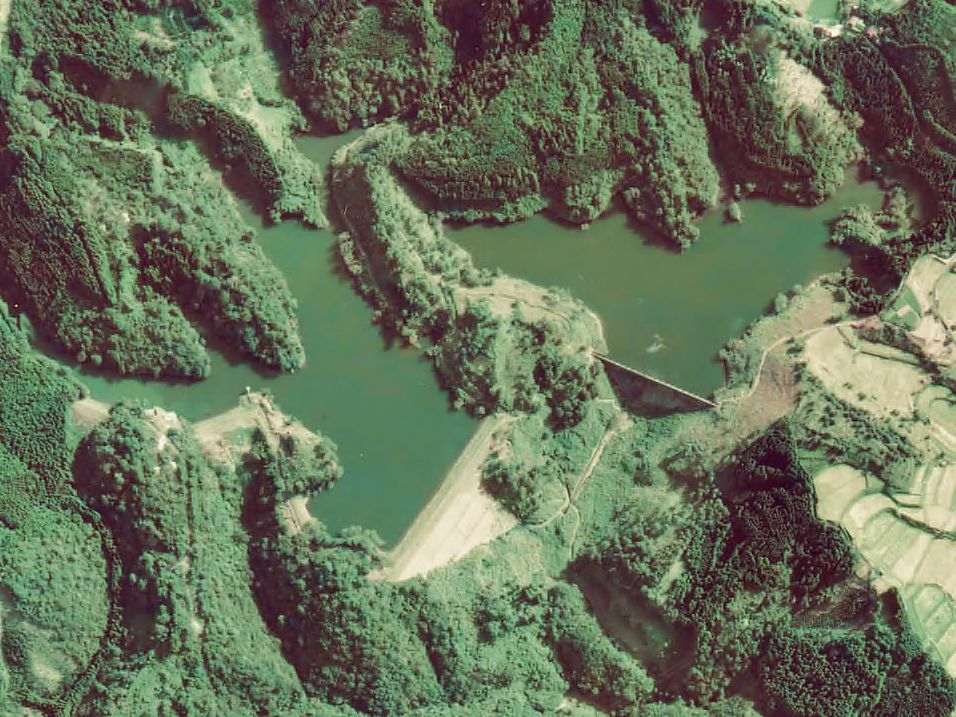
- Interactive map of Onagohata Dam
- Location: Ōita Prefecture, Japan
- Coordinates: 33°17′19″N 130°58′12″E

Onagohata Dam (Japanese: 女子畑発電所) is a dam in the Ōita Prefecture, Japan, completed in 1931.
