= Yamaguchi Dam (Fukuoka) =

Dam in Fukuoka Prefecture, Japan

- Location within Japan
- Location: Fukuoka Prefecture, Japan
- Coordinates: 33°45′50″N 130°56′26″E
- Construction began: 1970
- Opening date: 1996

Dam and spillways
- Height: 24 m (79 ft)
- Length: 475 m (1,558 ft)

Reservoir
- Total capacity: 800,000 m^{3} (28,000,000 cu ft)
- Catchment area: 3.7 km^{2} (1.4 sq mi)
- Surface area: 10 hectares (25 acres)

Yamaguchi Dam is an earth fill dam located in Fukuoka Prefecture in Japan. The dam is used for irrigation and water supply. The catchment area of the dam is 3.7 km^{2}. The dam impounds about 10 ha of land when full and can store 800 thousand cubic meters of water. The construction of the dam was started on 1970 and completed in 1996.
