= Gokayama Dam =

Dam in Fukuoka Prefecture, Japan

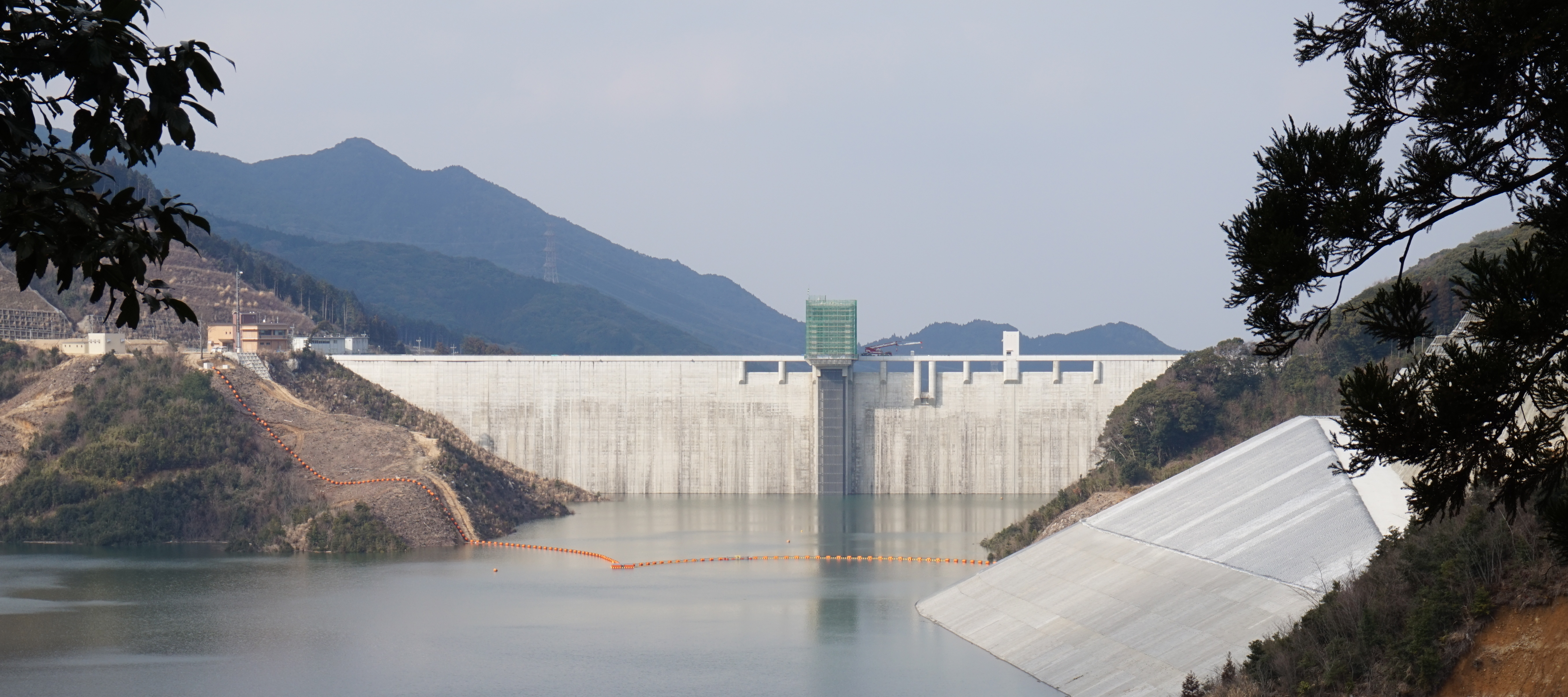

- Location within Japan
- Interactive map of Gokayama Dam
- Location: Fukuoka Prefecture, Japan
- Coordinates: 33°24′51″N 130°25′08″E
- Construction began: 1983
- Opening date: 2017

Dam and spillways
- Height: 102.5 m (336 ft)
- Length: 556 m (1,824 ft)

Reservoir
- Total capacity: 40200 thousand cubic meters
- Catchment area: 18.9 sq. km
- Surface area: 130 hectares

Gokayama Dam is a gravity dam located in Fukuoka Prefecture in Japan. The dam is used for flood control and water supply. The catchment area of the dam is 18.9 km^{2}. The dam impounds about 130 ha of land when full and can store 40200 thousand cubic meters of water. The construction of the dam was started on 1983 and completed in 2017.
