= Jinya Dam =

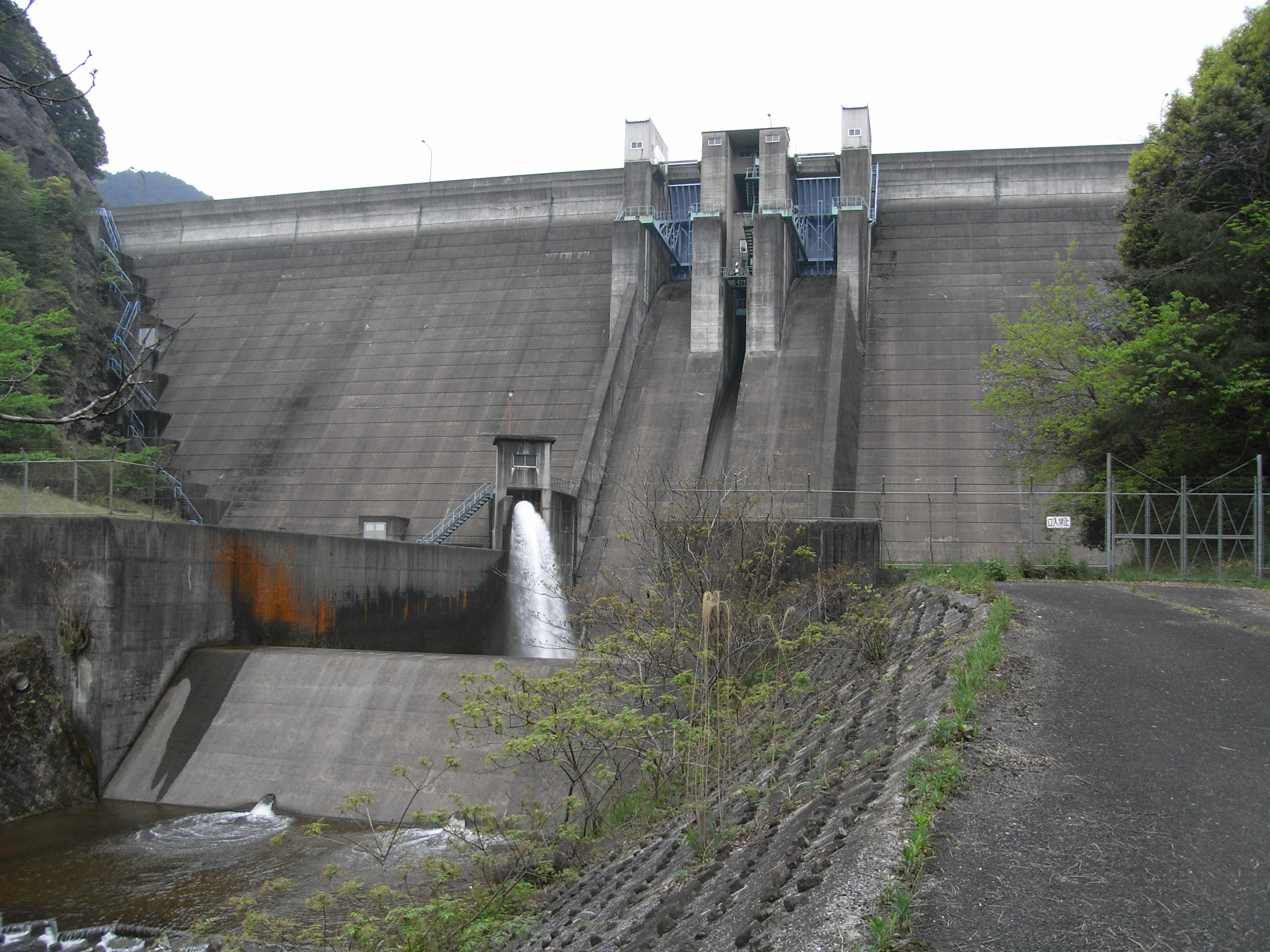
- Location: Soeda, Fukuoka, Japan
- Coordinates: 33°31′39″N 130°50′42″E
- Construction began: 1967
- Opening date: 1975

Dam and spillways
- Impounds: Chugenjigawa River
- Height: 48.5 m
- Length: 205.0 m

Reservoir
- Total capacity: 2,650,000 m^{3}
- Catchment area: 12.6 km^{2}
- Surface area: 14 hectares

Jinya Dam (陣屋ダム, Jinya damu) is a dam in Soeda, Fukuoka Prefecture, Japan.
