= Minamihata Dam =

Dam in Fukuoka Prefecture, Japan

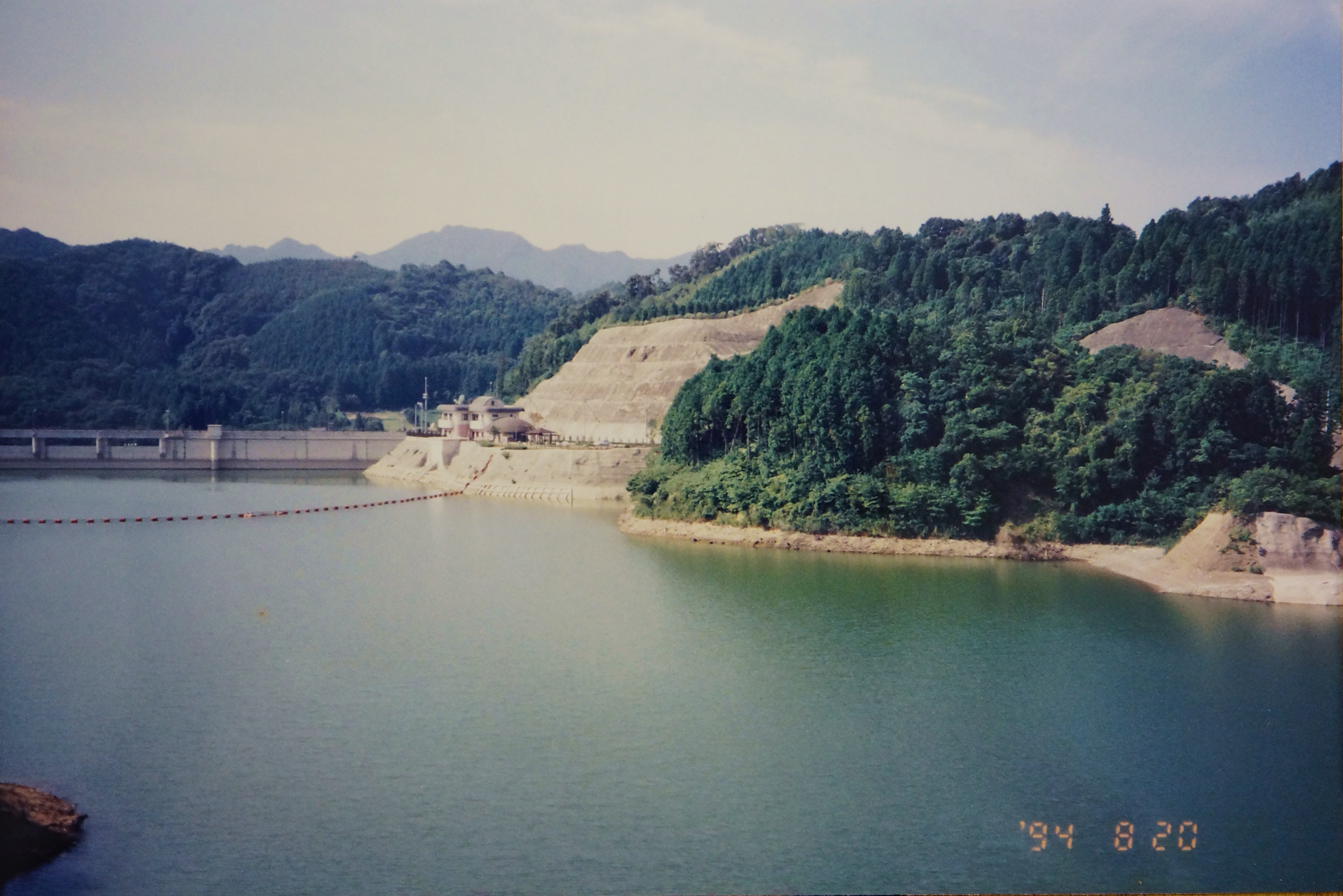

- Location within Japan
- Location: Fukuoka Prefecture, Japan
- Coordinates: 33°26′05″N 130°25′29″E
- Construction began: 1979
- Opening date: 1985

Dam and spillways
- Height: 63.5 m (208 ft)
- Length: 220.4 m (723 ft)

Reservoir
- Total capacity: 6000 thousand cubic meters
- Catchment area: 27.5 sq. km
- Surface area: 27 hectares

Minamihata Dam is a gravity dam located in Fukuoka Prefecture in Japan. The dam is used for flood control, water supply and power production. The catchment area of the dam is 27.5 km^{2}. The dam impounds about 27 ha of land when full and can store 6000 thousand cubic meters of water. The construction of the dam was started on 1979 and completed in 1985.
