= Egawa Dam =

Coordinates: 33°27′36″N 130°44′03″E

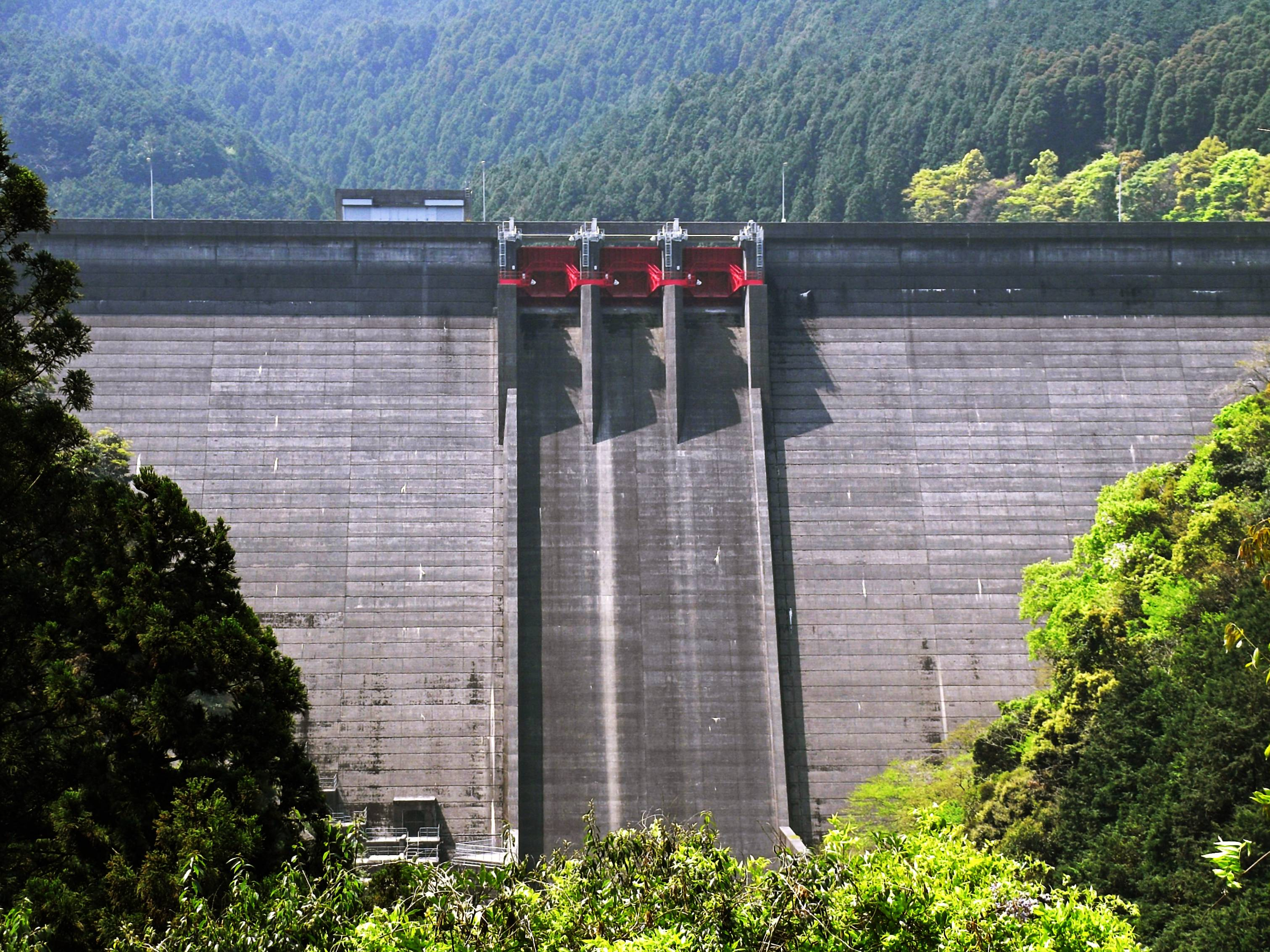
- Interactive map of Egawa Dam
- Location: Asakura, Fukuoka, Japan
- Construction began: 1967
- Opening date: 1972

Dam and spillways
- Type of dam: Concrete gravity dam
- Impounds: Koishiharagawa River
- Height: 79.2 m
- Length: 297.9 m

Reservoir
- Total capacity: 25,326,000 m^{3}
- Catchment area: 30.0 km^{2}
- Surface area: 86 hectares

Egawa Dam (江川ダム) is a dam in Asakura, Fukuoka Prefecture, Japan. The dam was completed in 1972.
