= Yoake Dam =

Dam in Fukuoka Prefecture, Japan

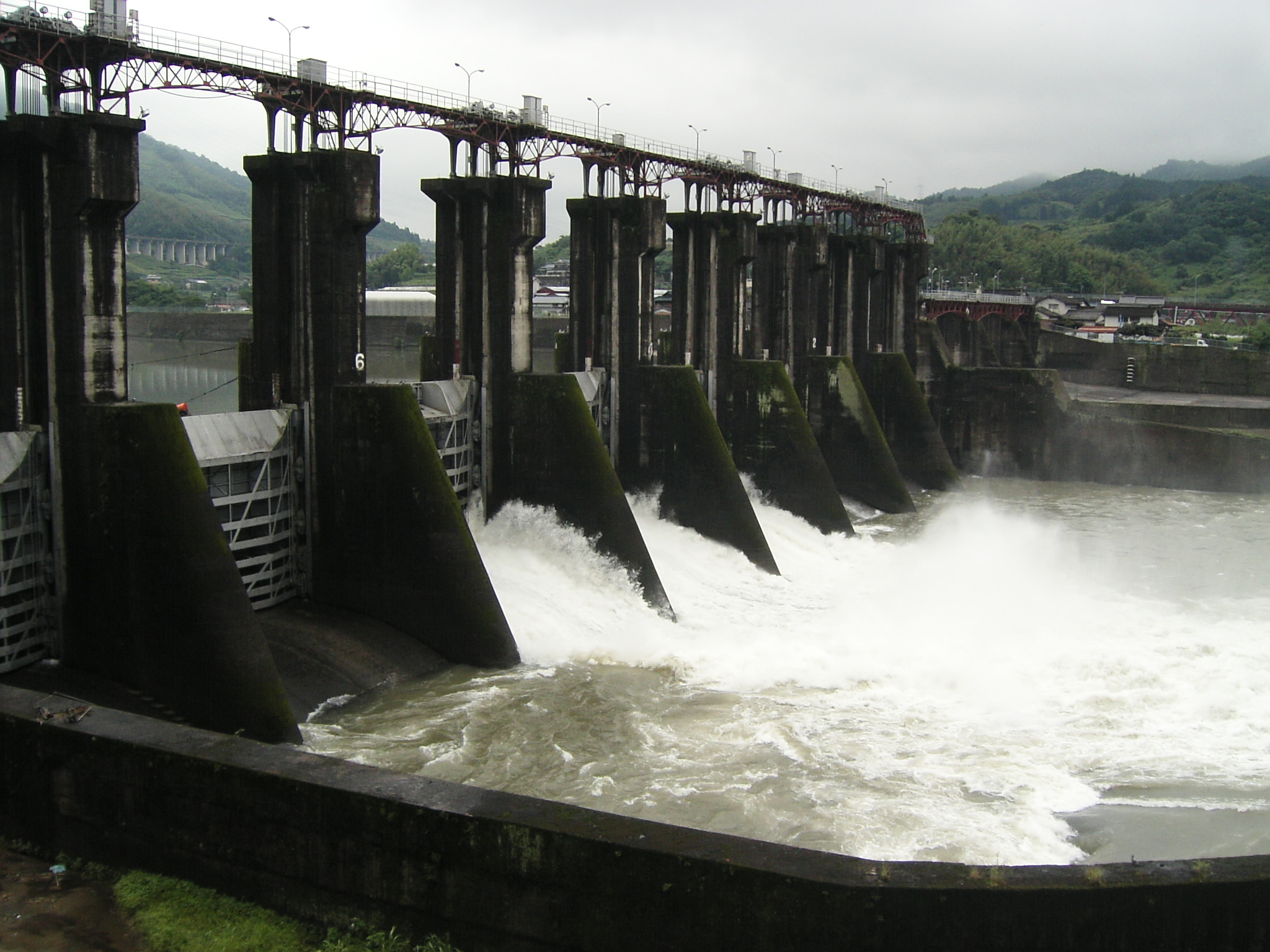

- Location within Japan
- Location: Fukuoka Prefecture, Japan
- Coordinates: 33°20′18″N 130°50′43″E
- Construction began: 1951
- Opening date: 1954

Dam and spillways
- Height: 15 m (49 ft)
- Length: 223 m (732 ft)

Reservoir
- Total capacity: 4,050,000 m^{3} (143,000,000 cu ft)
- Catchment area: 1,440 km^{2} (560 sq mi)
- Surface area: 85.3 hectares (211 acres)

Yoake Dam is a gravity dam located in Fukuoka Prefecture in Japan. The dam is used for power production. The catchment area of the dam is 1440 km^{2}. The dam impounds about 85.3 ha of land when full and can store 4050 thousand cubic meters of water. The construction of the dam was started on 1951 and completed in 1954.
