= Kasagi Dam (Fukuoka) =

Dam in Fukuoka Prefecture, Japan

- Location within Japan
- Interactive map of Kasagi Dam
- Location: Fukuoka Prefecture, Japan
- Coordinates: 33°40′38″N 130°39′32″E
- Opening date: 1957

Dam and spillways
- Height: 16 m (52 ft)
- Length: 146 m (479 ft)

Reservoir
- Total capacity: 399 thousand cubic meters
- Catchment area: 0.6 sq. km
- Surface area: hectares

Kasagi Dam is an earthfill dam located in Fukuoka Prefecture in Japan. The dam is used for irrigation. The catchment area of the dam is 0.6 km^{2}. The dam can store 399 thousand cubic meters of water. The construction of the dam was completed in 1957.
