= Nakatsu Domain =

Administrative division in Japan during the Edo period (1600–1871)

Nakatsu Domain 中津藩
- Domain of Japan
- 1600–1871
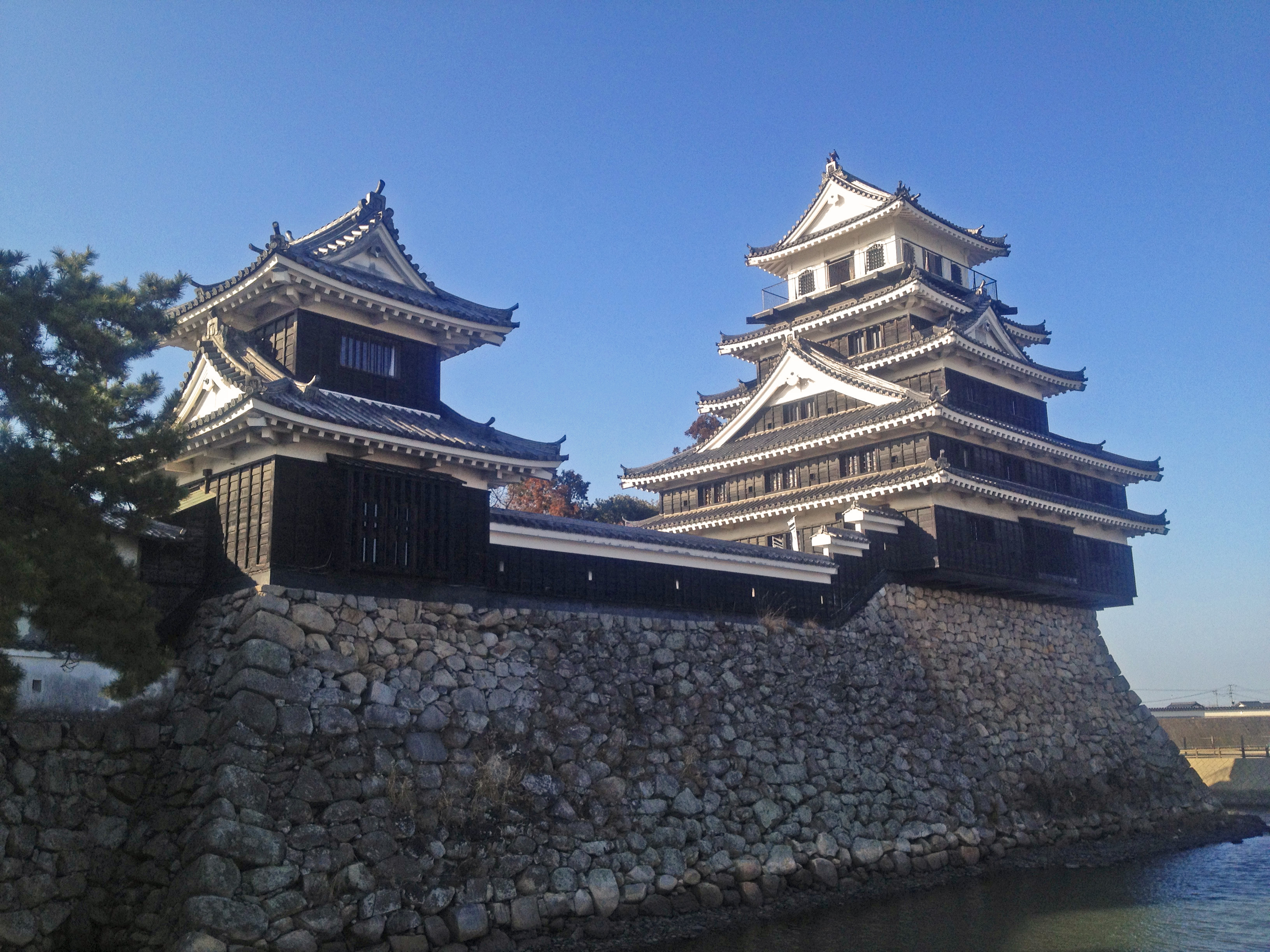
- Nakatsu Castle

- Mon of the Okudaira clan
- Capital: Nakatsu Castle
- Area
  - Coordinates: 33°36′23″N 131°11′10″E
- Historical era: Edo period
  - Established: 1600
  - Abolition of the han system: 1871
- Contained within
  - Province: Buzen Province
- Today part of: Ōita Prefecture

Location of Nakatsu Castle
Nakatsu Domain (Japan)

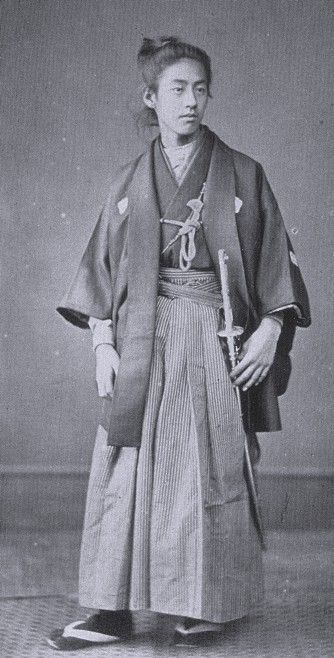
Okudaira Masayuki, final daimyō of Nakatsu Domain

Nakatsu Domain (中津藩, Nakatsu-han) was a feudal domain under the Tokugawa shogunate of Edo period Japan, in what is now northern Ōita Prefecture. It was centered around Nakatsu Castle in what is now Nakatsu, Ōita and was ruled by the fudai daimyō Okudaira clan for much of its history.

== History ==
After Toyotomi Hideyoshi's conquest of Kyushu in 1587, Kuroda Kambe was awarded a 123,000 koku (according to one theory, 160,000 koku) domain in northern Kyushu, with Nakatsu as one of his strongholds. In 1600, his son Kuroda Nagamasa, who had distinguished himself in the Battle of Sekigahara, was transferred to Fukuoka Domain for an additional 523,100 koku. At the same time, Hosokawa Tadaoki, who also sided with the eastern army at the Battle of Sekigahara, received 399,000 koku was transferred from Miyazu Domain in Tango Province, and established Nakatsu Domain under the Tokugawa shogunate. In 1602, Tadaoki moved his seat to Kokura Castle, retaining Nakatsu Castle as a branch castle. In 1632, the second daimyō of the domain, Hosokawa Tadatoshi, was transferred to Kumamoto Domain.

He was replaced by Ogasawara Tadamasa from Akashi Domain as daimyō of Kokura Domain and assigned Nakatsu Castle to his nephew Ogasawara Nagatsuji as the head of a cadet branch of the clan, and received official recognition as an independent daimyō. In 1698, the third daimyō of Nakatsu, Ogasawara Nagatane, was accused of mismanagement and misbehavior in daily life. However, instead of attainder, the Tokugawa shogunate ordered that the parent clan in Kokura replace him with his younger brother Ogasawara Naganobu with his kokudaka halved to 40,000 koku, which was halved. In 1716. The fifth daimyō, Ogasawara Nagao, died at the age of seven, and his younger brother, Ogasawara Nagaoki was transferred to the Anji Domain (10,000 koku) in Harima Province.

Nakatsu was then awarded in 1717 to Okudaira Masanari, formerly of Miyazu Domain, with a kokudaka set at 100,000 koku. The Okudaira clan would continue to rule Nakatsu for nine generations and 155 years until the abolition of feudal domains and establishment of prefectures in 1871. The eighth daimyō, Okudaira Masamoto strongly advocated restoration of the national isolation policy after the arrival of the Perry Expedition and expelled the foreigners, contradicting the idea of opening up the country of his retired grandfather Masataka, who held the real power in the domain's administration. When Masataka died in 1855, he began reforming the domain's military, including building artillery forts. As the Okudaira clan was a prestigious fudai daimyō clan, when the pro-Tokugawa forces were defeated at the Battle of Toba-Fushimi at the start of the Boshin War, he defected to the imperial side and dispatched forces in the Aizu War against pro-Tokugawa remnants.

Following the Meiji restoration, Nakatsu was incorporated into Oita Prefecture via Nakatsu Prefecture, Kokura Prefecture, and Fukuoka Prefecture.

Nakatsu Domain contributed a number of persons important to the development of Bakumatsu period and Meiji period Japan, most notably Fukuzawa Yukichi, founder of Keio Gijuku, the predecessor to Keio University.

== Holdings at the end of the Edo period ==
As with most domains in the han system, Nakatsu Domain consisted of several discontinuous territories calculated to provide the assigned kokudaka, based on periodic cadastral surveys and projected agricultural yields.

- Buzen Province
  - 129 villages in Usa District
  - 42 villages in Shimoge District
  - 22 villages in Kōge District
- Bingo Province
  - 12 villages in Kōnu District
  - 2 villages in Yasuna District
  - 22 villages in Jinseki District
- Chikuzen Province
  - 32 villages in Ito District

== List of daimyō ==
#	Name	Tenure	Courtesy title	Court Rank	kokudaka
Hosokawa clan, 1600–1602 (Tozama)
1	Hosokawa Tadaoki (細川忠興)	1600–1602	Etchu-no-kami (越中守)	Junior 5th Rank, Lower Grade (従五位下)	399,000 koku
2	Hosokawa Tadatoshi (細川忠利)	1602–1632	Etchu-no-kami (越中守)	Junior 5th Rank, Lower Grade (従五位下)	399,000 koku
Ogasawara clan, 1632–1716 (Fudai)
1	Ogasawara Nagatsugu (小笠原長次 )	1632–1666	Shinano-no-kami (信濃守)	Junior 5th Rank, Lower Grade (従五位下)	80,000 koku
2	Ogasawara Nagakatsu (小笠原長勝 )	1666–1682	Shinano-no-kami (信濃守)	Junior 5th Rank, Lower Grade (従五位下)	80,000 koku
3	Ogasawara Nagatane (小笠原長胤 )	1683–1698	Shuri-no-daifu (修理大夫)	Junior 5th Rank, Lower Grade (従五位下)	80,000 koku
4	Ogasawara Naganobu (小笠原長円)	1698–1713	Shinano-no-kami (信濃守)	Junior 5th Rank, Lower Grade (従五位下)	40,000 koku
5	Ogasawara Nagasato (小笠原長邕)	1713–1716	none -	-none-	40,000 koku
Okudaira clan, 1717–1871 (Fudai)
1	Okudaira Masashige (奥平昌成)	1717–1746	Okashiwade-no-kami (大膳大夫)	Junior 4th Rank, Lower Grade (従四位下)	100,000 koku
2	Okudaira Masaatsu (奥平昌敦)	1746–1758	Okashiwade-no-kami (大膳大夫)	Junior 5th Rank, Lower Grade (従五位下)	100,000 koku
3	Okudaira Masashika (奥平昌鹿)	1758–1780	Okashiwade-no-kami (大膳大夫)	Junior 5th Rank, Lower Grade (従五位下)	100,000 koku
4	Okudaira Masao (奥平昌男)	1780–1786	Okashiwade-no-kami (大膳大夫)	Junior 5th Rank, Lower Grade (従五位下)	100,000 koku
5	Okudaira Masataka (奥平昌高)	1786–1826	Okashiwade-no-kami (大膳大夫)	Junior 4th Rank, Lower Grade (従四位下)	100,000 koku
6	Okudaira Masanobu (奥平昌暢)	1826–1832	Okashiwade-no-kami (大膳大夫)	Junior 5th Rank, Lower Grade (従五位下)	100,000 koku
7	Okudaira Masamichi (奥平昌猷)	1832–1842	Okashiwade-no-kami (大膳大夫)	Junior 5th Rank, Lower Grade (従五位下)	100,000 koku
8	Okudaira Masamoto (奥平昌服)	1842–1868	Okashiwade-no-kami (大膳大夫)	Junior 5th Rank, Lower Grade (従五位下)	100,000 koku
9	Okudaira Masayuki (奥平昌邁)	1868–1871	Mimasaka-no-kami (美作守)	Junior 5th Rank, Lower Grade (従五位下)	100,000 koku

== See also ==
- List of Han
- Abolition of the han system
