= Mount Hachimen =

Mountain in Japan

- 八面山
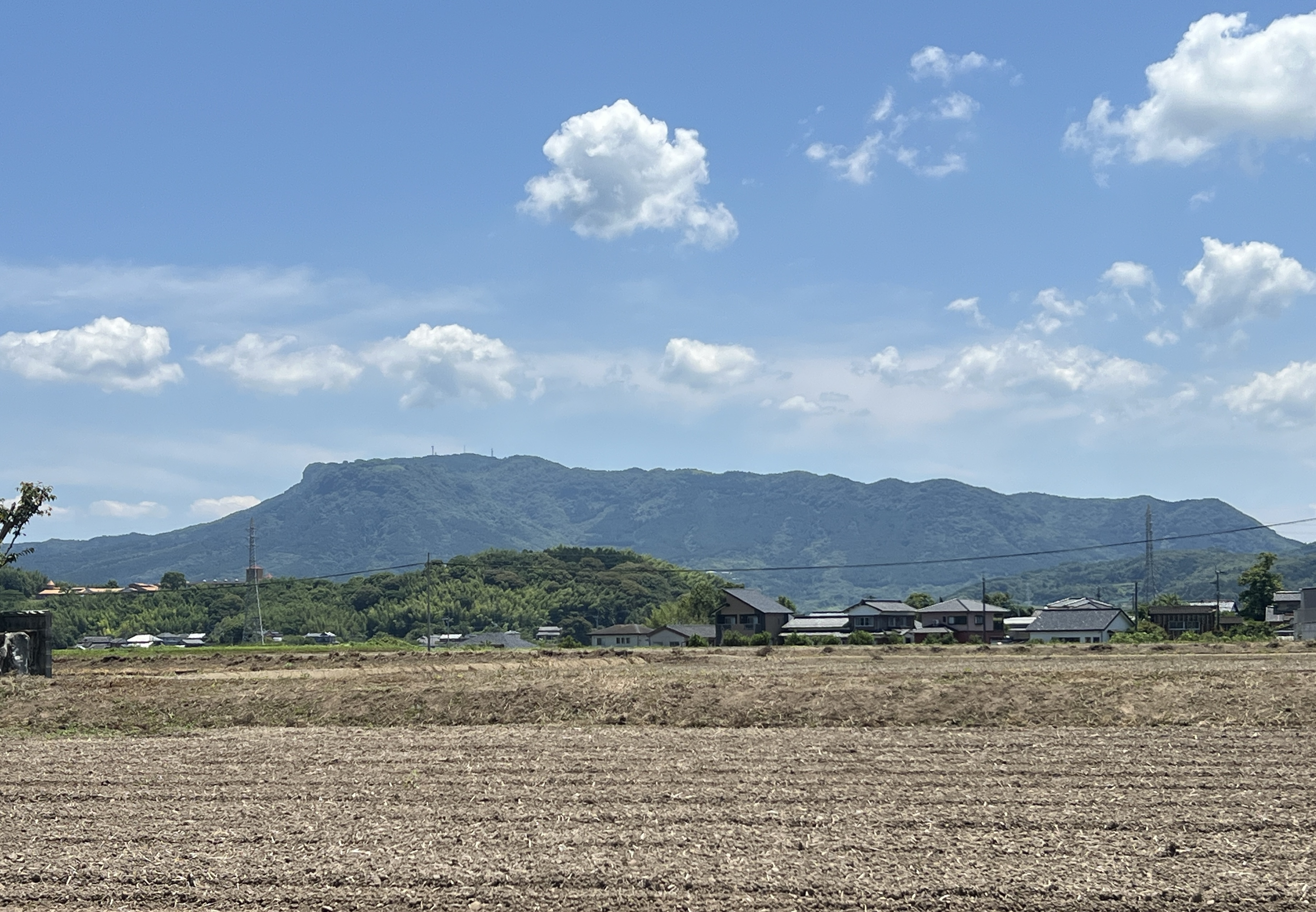

Highest point
- Elevation: 659.4 m (2,163 ft)
- Coordinates: 33°29′45.3″N 131°13′36.2″E

Geography
- Location: Sankō, Nakatsu, Ōita Prefecture, Japan

Mount Hachimen (八面山, Hachimen-zan) is a mesa in Nakatsu, Ōita Prefecture, Japan. Its elevation is 659.4 meter (2,163 feet). It is the most prominent mountain in Nakatsu and is seen as a symbol of the city.

As it is said that the mountain looks the same from every direction, it was given the name Hachimen-zan (lit. "eight-faced mountain"). It is also sometimes called Yayama (箭山, lit. "arrow mountain") due to the arrow bamboo that once grew on the mountain.

== Hachimenzan Peace Park ==
On May 7, 1945, a USAAF B-29 bomber aircraft, nicknamed "Empire Express", which was taking part in a raid on an Imperial Japanese airbase in Usa, Ōita was rammed by a Kawasaki Ki-45 Toryu. The B-29 crashed into Mount Hachimen, killing eight of the eleven-person crew. The Japanese Toryu also crashed, killing the pilot. The three surviving airmen of the B-29, who had parachuted out, were captured and sent to the Western District Army headquarters in Fukuoka. They are believed to have been executed on June 20, 1945.

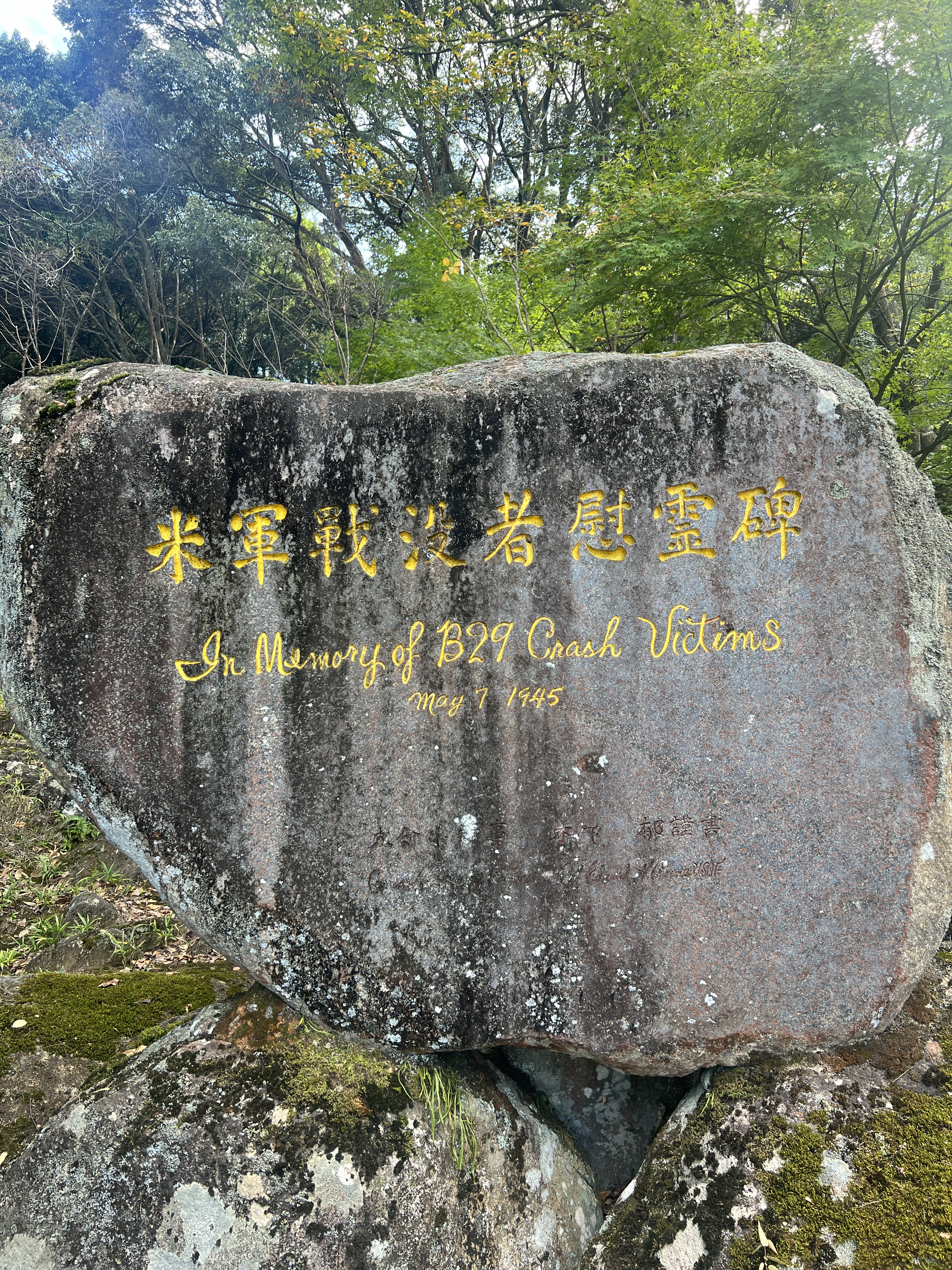
Hachimenzan Peace Park Memorial to the B-29 crash victims

On May 7, 1970, the 25th anniversary of the crash, a memorial for the lost airmen was erected at the crash site and a ceremony was held. The site is now Hachimenzan Peace Park (八面山平和公園, Hachimen-zan Heiwa Kōen). A memorial event is held at the park annually on May 3. In 1993, an eternal flame was lit at the park using a flame from Hoshino Village, Fukuoka's "Flame of Peace." There is also a preserved JASDF F-86 Sabre fighter at the park.

== Jingo-ji ==
Mount Hachimen has been considered sacred in mountain Buddhism since ancient times. Next to the Peace Park on Mount Hachimen is a Buddhist temple called Jingo-ji (神護寺). At the temple, a 7.8m long, 1.4m high statue carved into stone, which was completed in 1972, depicts a reclining Buddha.
