= Yabakei, Ōita =

Dissolved municipality in Ōita prefecture, Japan

Yabakei (耶馬溪町, Yabakei-machi) was a town located in Shimoge District, Ōita Prefecture, Japan.

As of 2003, the town had an estimated population of 5,215 and the density of 28.39 persons per km^{2}. The total area was 183.70 km^{2}.

On March 1, 2005, Yabakei, along with the towns of Hon'yabakei and Yamakuni, and the village of Sankō (all from Shimoge District), was merged into the expanded city of Nakatsu.

An area of lush forests and mountains, Yabakei was known for its beautiful autumn leaves. It also was home to the Aonodōmon, a legendary tunnel said to have been dug through solid rock by a single man over 30 years, and Rakanji, a famous mountain temple.
