= Nakatsu, Ōita =

Nakatsu 中津市
- City
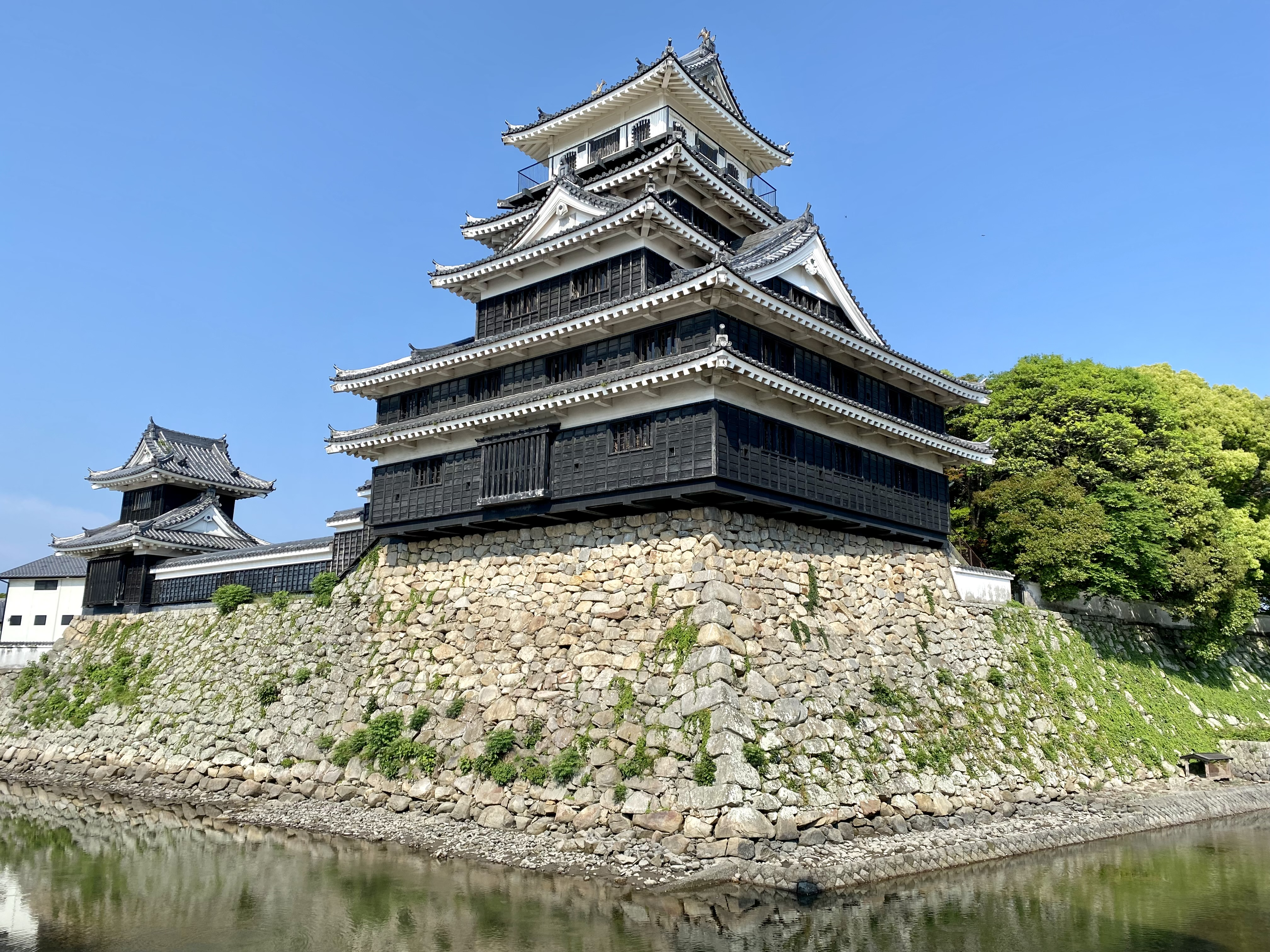

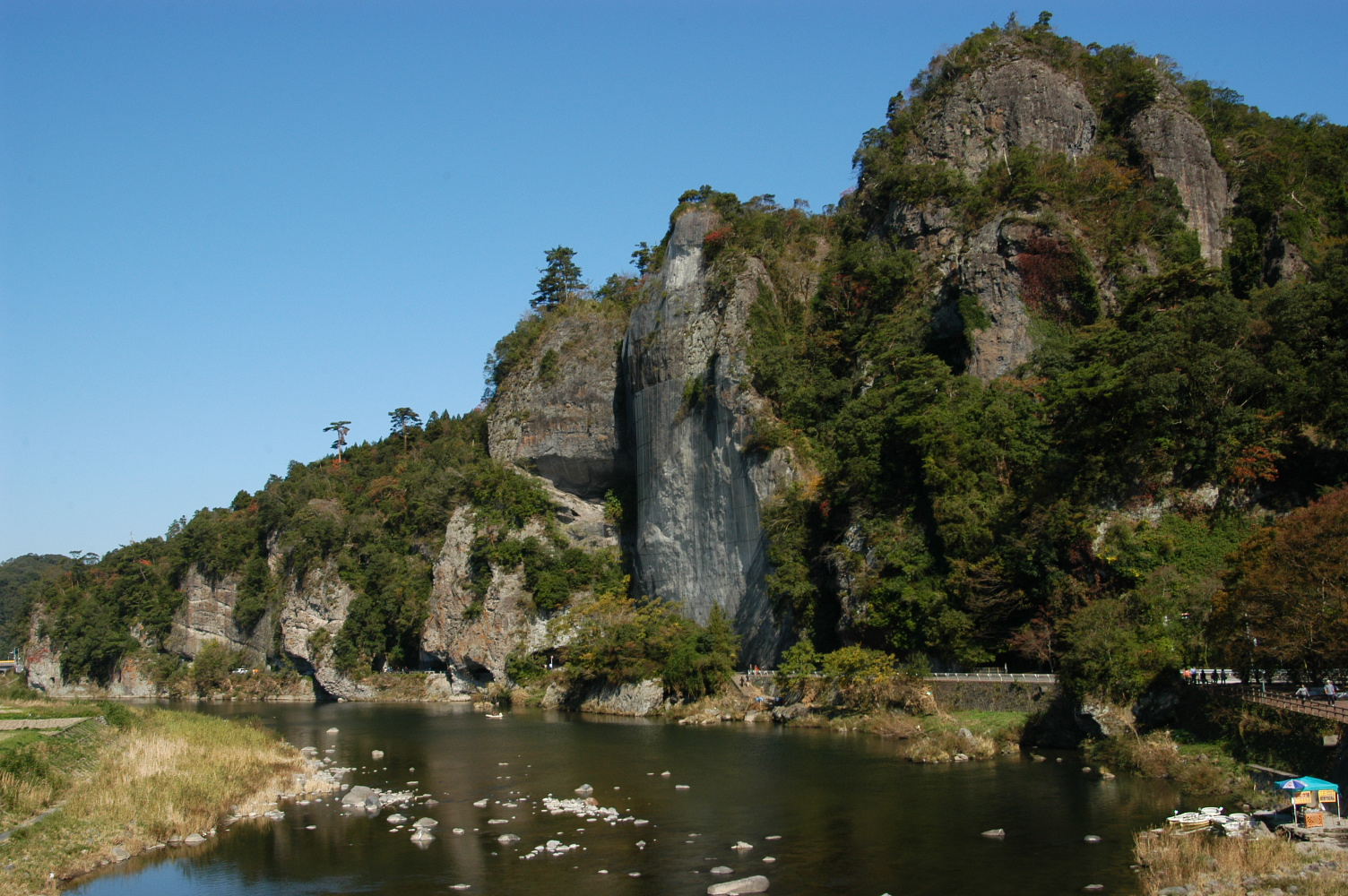

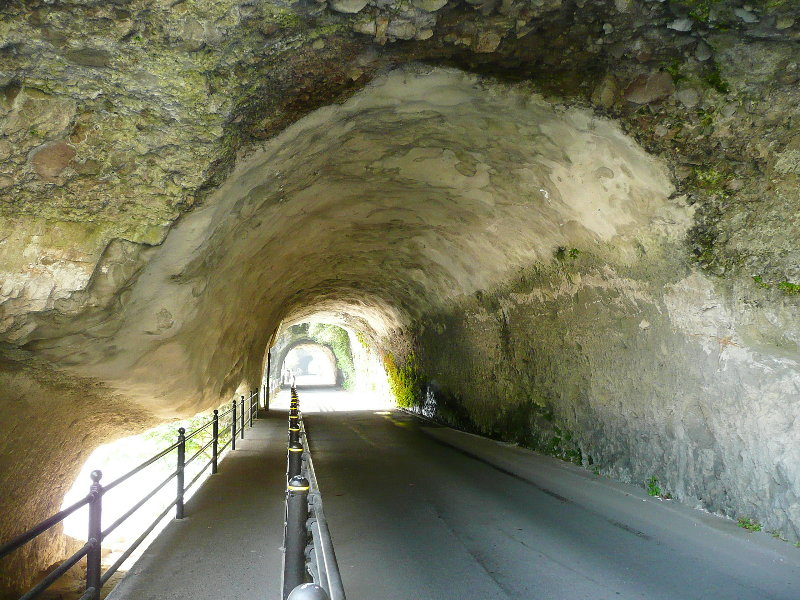

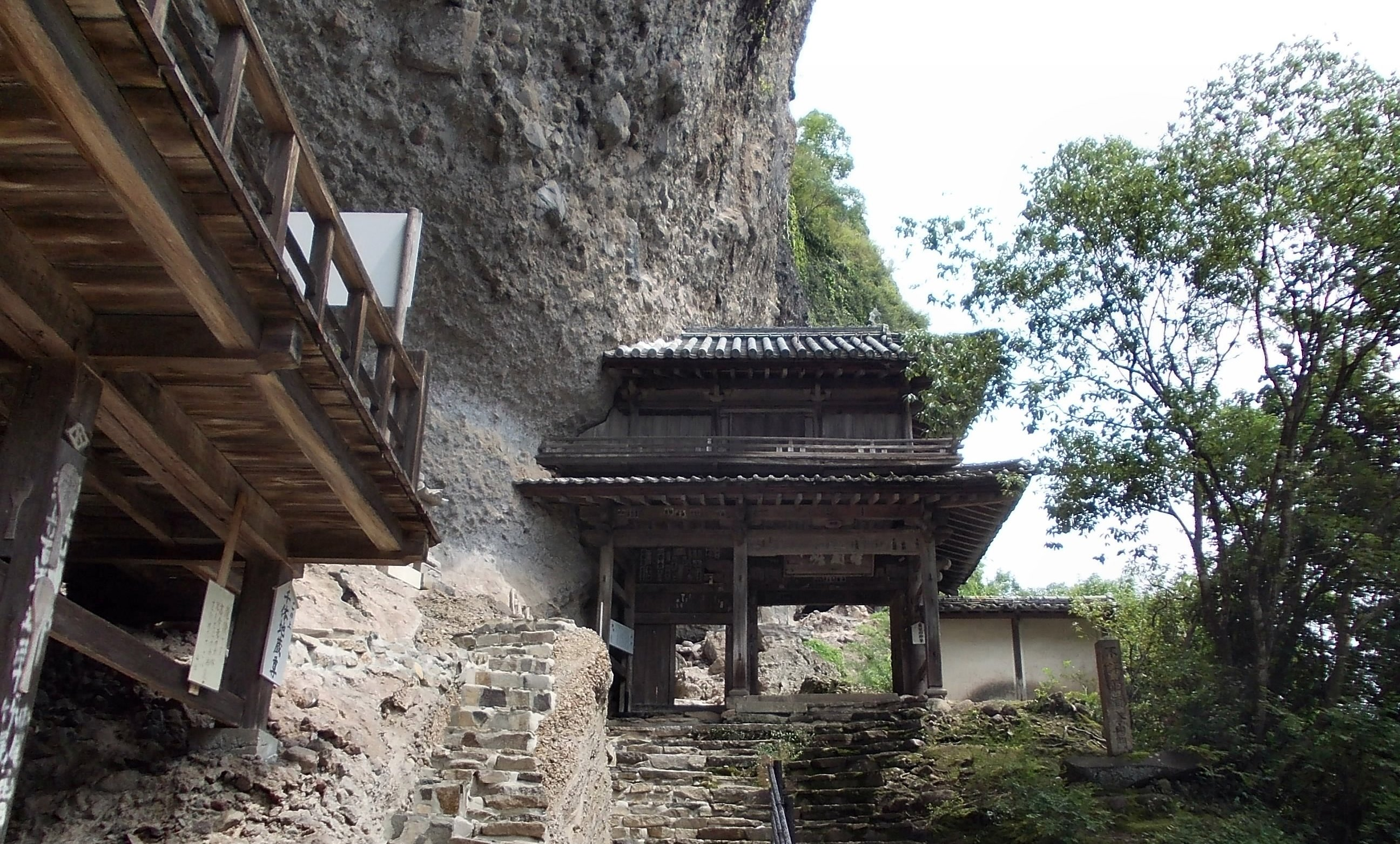
Nakatsu Castle	Fukuzawa Yukichi residence
Yabakei Gorge
Aonodōmon	Rakan-ji
- Flag Seal
- Location of Nakatsu in Ōita Prefecture

- Location in Japan
- Coordinates: 33°35′54″N 131°11′18″E
- Country: Japan
- Region: Kyushu
- Prefecture: Ōita

Government
  - Mayor: Masakatsu Shingai

Area
  - Total: 491.53 km^{2} (189.78 sq mi)

Population (December 15, 2023)
  - Total: 82,301
  - Density: 167.44/km^{2} (433.66/sq mi)
- Time zone: UTC+09:00 (JST)
- City hall address: 14-3 Toyodamachi, Nakatsu-shi, Ōita-ken 871-8501
- Climate: Cfa
- Website: Official website
- Symbols
- Flower: Chrysanthemum
- Tree: Round Leaf Holly (Ilex rotunda)

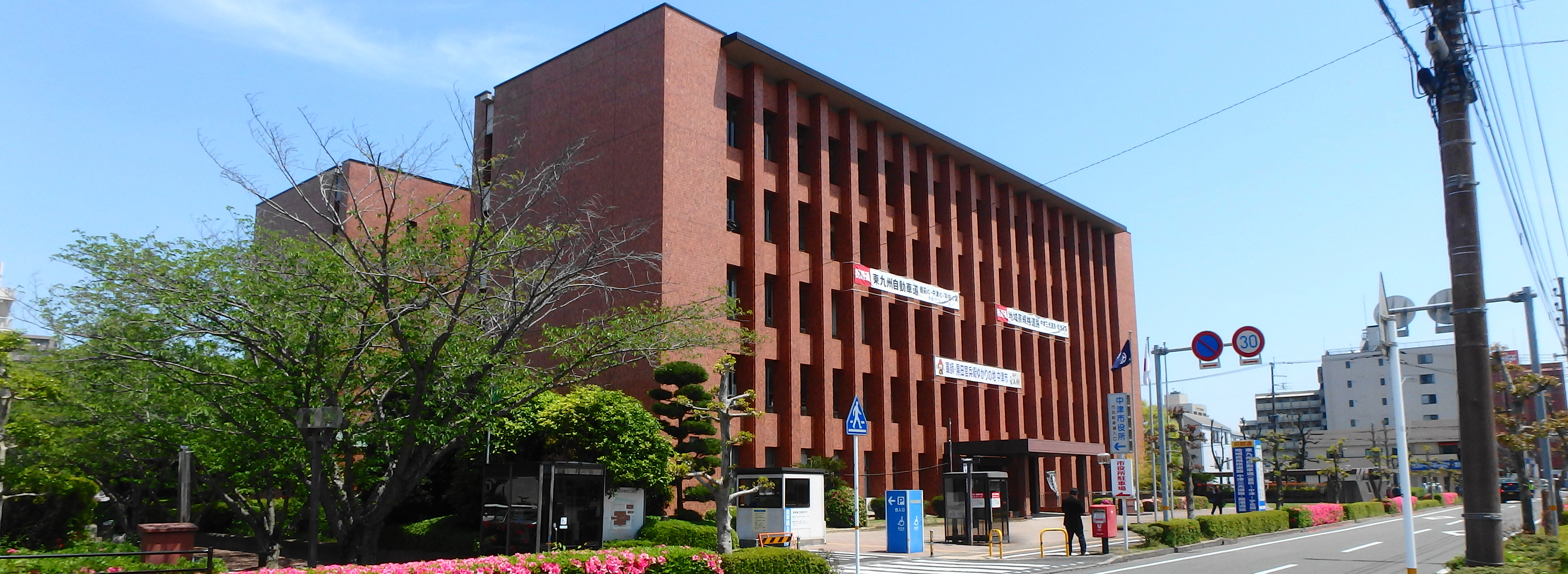
Nakatsu City Hall

Nakatsu (中津市, Nakatsu-shi) is a city on the northern border of Ōita Prefecture in Kyushu, Japan. As of 31 October 2023, the city had an estimated population of 82,301 in 41,222 households, and a population density of 96 persons per km^{2}. The total area of the city is 491.53 km^{2} (189.78 sq mi).

== Geography ==
Nakatsu is in the northwest corner of Ōita Prefecture, Kyushu and faces the Gulf of Suō on the Seto Inland Sea to the northeast. To the east of Nakatsu is Usa and to the southwest is Hita. Nakatsu touches the border of Fukuoka Prefecture on its west. Some 80% of the city area is mountainous, mainly in the south There is a wide stretch of flat, agricultural land which begins at the mouth of Yamakuni River and extends to Mount Hiko called the Nakatsu plain, making it the largest agricultural area in the prefecture.

The tallest mountain in Nakatsu is Mount Hachimen (八面山, Hachimen-zan), which literally means "eight-faced mountain". Its name is said to have come from the fact that the mountain looks nearly same from every angle. It seen as a symbol of Nakatsu with many legends surrounding it.

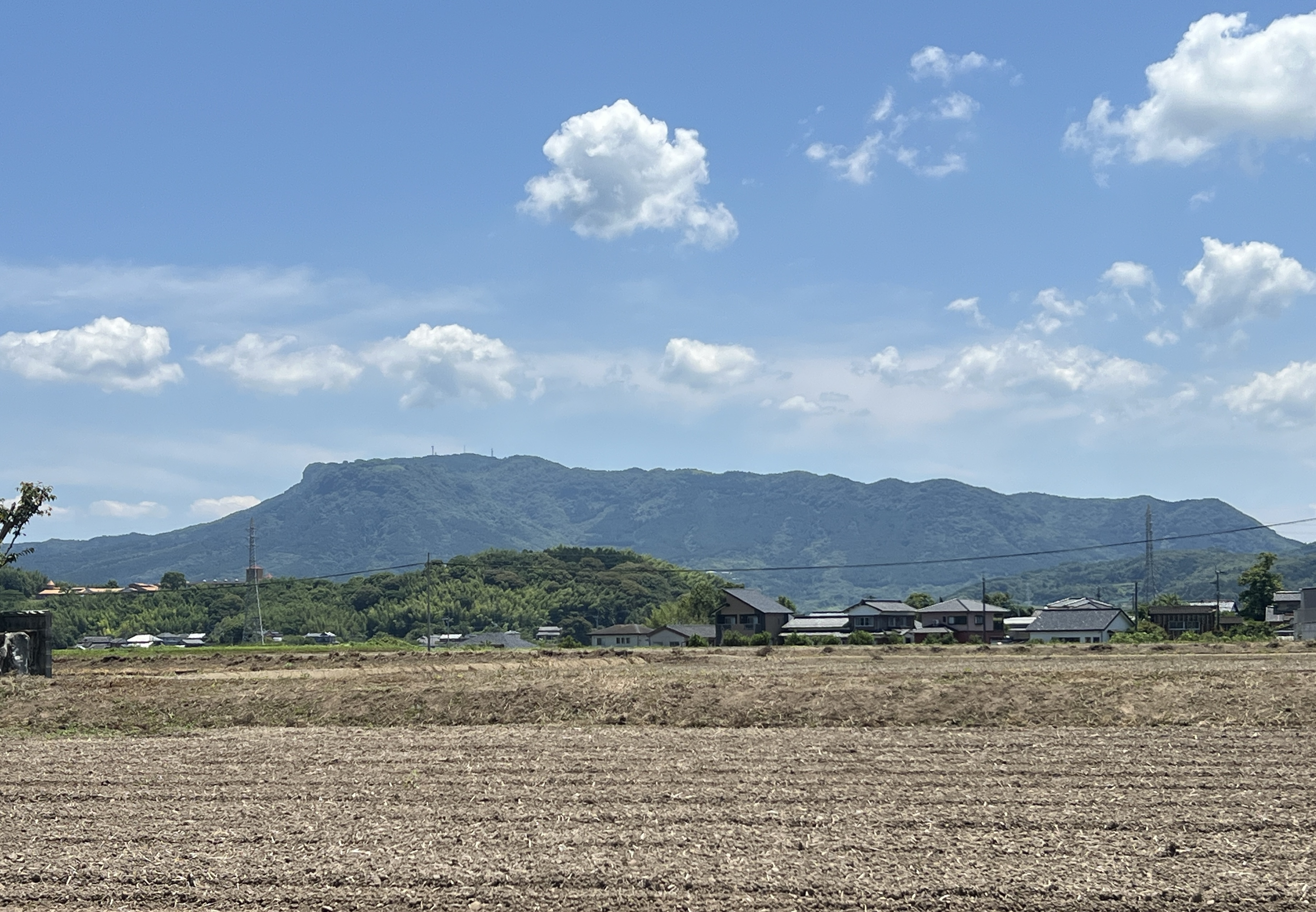
Mount Hachimen (八面山) as seen from Nakatsu City

=== Neighboring municipalities ===
Fukuoka Prefecture

- Buzen
- Chikujō
- Kōge
- Miyako
- Soeda
- Yoshitomi

Ōita Prefecture

- Hita
- Kusu
- Usa

=== Climate ===
Nakatsu has a humid subtropical climate (Köppen climate classification Cfa) with hot summers and cool winters. Precipitation is significant throughout the year, but is somewhat lower in winter. The average annual temperature in Nakatsu is 16.3 °C (61.3 °F). The average annual rainfall is 1,574.1 mm (61.97 in) with June as the wettest month. The temperatures are highest on average in August, at around 27.9 °C (82.2 °F), and lowest in January, at around 5.8 °C (42.4 °F). The highest temperature ever recorded in Nakatsu was 37.9 °C (100.2 °F) on 25 July 2013; the coldest temperature ever recorded was −5.5 °C (22.1 °F) on 24 January 2016.

Climate data for Nakatsu (2011−2020 normals, extremes 2011−present)
Month	Jan	Feb	Mar	Apr	May	Jun	Jul	Aug	Sep	Oct	Nov	Dec	Year
Record high °C (°F)	19.4 (66.9)	23.8 (74.8)	27.8 (82.0)	29.7 (85.5)	31.0 (87.8)	36.1 (97.0)	37.9 (100.2)	36.8 (98.2)	35.5 (95.9)	31.7 (89.1)	27.9 (82.2)	25.7 (78.3)	37.9 (100.2)
Mean daily maximum °C (°F)	9.7 (49.5)	10.2 (50.4)	14.2 (57.6)	19.0 (66.2)	24.0 (75.2)	26.1 (79.0)	30.4 (86.7)	32.0 (89.6)	27.5 (81.5)	22.6 (72.7)	17.5 (63.5)	11.5 (52.7)	20.4 (68.7)
Daily mean °C (°F)	5.8 (42.4)	6.1 (43.0)	9.7 (49.5)	14.2 (57.6)	19.2 (66.6)	22.4 (72.3)	26.7 (80.1)	27.9 (82.2)	23.7 (74.7)	18.6 (65.5)	13.2 (55.8)	7.5 (45.5)	16.2 (61.3)
Mean daily minimum °C (°F)	2.0 (35.6)	2.1 (35.8)	5.2 (41.4)	9.3 (48.7)	14.4 (57.9)	19.3 (66.7)	23.7 (74.7)	24.5 (76.1)	20.5 (68.9)	14.8 (58.6)	9.0 (48.2)	3.7 (38.7)	12.4 (54.3)
Record low °C (°F)	−5.5 (22.1)	−4.4 (24.1)	−1.8 (28.8)	0.6 (33.1)	6.3 (43.3)	12.8 (55.0)	17.3 (63.1)	18.0 (64.4)	13.1 (55.6)	7.3 (45.1)	0.4 (32.7)	−2.2 (28.0)	−5.5 (22.1)
Average precipitation mm (inches)	56.2 (2.21)	70.2 (2.76)	88.5 (3.48)	98.3 (3.87)	102.6 (4.04)	289.5 (11.40)	302.8 (11.92)	146.0 (5.75)	178.8 (7.04)	133.0 (5.24)	61.6 (2.43)	59.1 (2.33)	1,574.1 (61.97)
Average precipitation days (≥ 1.0 mm)	5.7	8.6	8.3	9.1	7.1	12.2	10.9	8.8	9.6	7.5	7.2	7.5	102.5
Mean monthly sunshine hours	139.3	136.1	189.3	198.5	219.9	131.5	174.3	215.3	146.3	169.7	144.0	126.2	2,005
Source: Japan Meteorological Agency

=== Demographics ===
Per Japanese census data, the population of Nakatsu in 2020 is 82,863 people. Nakatsu has been conducting censuses since 1920.

Historical population
Year	Pop.	±%
1920	70,768	—
1925	74,511	+5.3%
1930	76,036	+2.0%
1935	77,704	+2.2%
1940	77,121	−0.8%
1945	102,490	+32.9%
1950	101,947	−0.5%
1955	103,277	+1.3%
1960	95,464	−7.6%
1965	87,711	−8.1%
1970	83,262	−5.1%
1975	82,169	−1.3%
1980	85,963	+4.6%
1985	87,736	+2.1%
1990	86,965	−0.9%
1995	86,679	−0.3%
2000	85,617	−1.2%
2005	84,368	−1.5%
2010	84,324	−0.1%
2015	83,965	−0.4%
2020	82,863	−1.3%
Nakatsu population statistics

== History ==
The area of Nakatsu was part of ancient Buzen Province. During the Sengoku period, Kuroda Yoshitaka (Josui) built Nakatsu Castle as a flatland castle near the Yamaguni River in 1587. During the Edo period it became the center of the 100,000 koku Nakatsu Domain which was ruled by the Okudaira clan. After the Meiji restoration, the town of Nakatsu within Shimoge District, Ōita was established on May 1, 1889, with the creation of the modern municipalities system. It was raised to city status on April 20, 1929. On October 1, 2005, Kitsuki merged with the town of Yamaka from Hayami District and the village of Ota from Nishikunisaki District, Ōita.

- April 1951: The village of Miho was merged into Nakatsu.
- October 1954: The village of Wada was merged into Nakatsu.
- February 1955: The village of Imazu was merged into Nakatsu.
- March 2005: The towns of Hon'yabakei, Yabakei and Yamakuni, and the village of Sankō (all from Shimoge District) were all merged into Nakatsu.

== Government ==
Nakatsu has a mayor-council form of government with a directly elected mayor and a unicameral city council of 24 members. Nakatsu contributes four members to the Ōita Prefectural Assembly. In terms of national politics, the city is part of the Ōita 3rd district of the lower house of the Diet of Japan.

== Economy ==
Nakatsu is the third most populous city in Ōita Prefecture after Ōita City and Beppu and has strong economic and cultural ties with the Kitakyushu area of Fukuoka Prefecture. A large number of Nakatsu inhabitants commute to work and school to Fukuoka Prefecture. At the end of 2004, Daihatsu Auto Body Co., Ltd. moved its head office and factory to Nakatsu, resulting in an increasing concentration of automobile-related factories. Other industries include ceramics, semiconductors and plastics.

== Education ==
Nakatsu has 21 public elementary schools and ten public junior high schools operated by the city government and four public high schools operated by the Ōita Prefectural Board of Education. The city also has one private high school. The Higashikyushu Junior College is located in Nakatsu.

== Transportation ==
=== Railways ===
JR Kyushu - Nippō Main Line

- Nakatsu - Higashi-Nakatsu - Imazu

=== Highways ===
- Higashikyushu Expressway
- National Route 10
- National Route 212
- National Route 213
- National Route 496
- National Route 500
- National Route 212

== Local specialties ==
- Karaage – Nakatsu is known for being the "holy land" of chicken karaage. Nakatsu Karaage (中津唐揚げ) is known throughout Japan. The city, along with neighboring Usa City, is known for being the origin of the post-war boom in the popularity of chicken karaage.

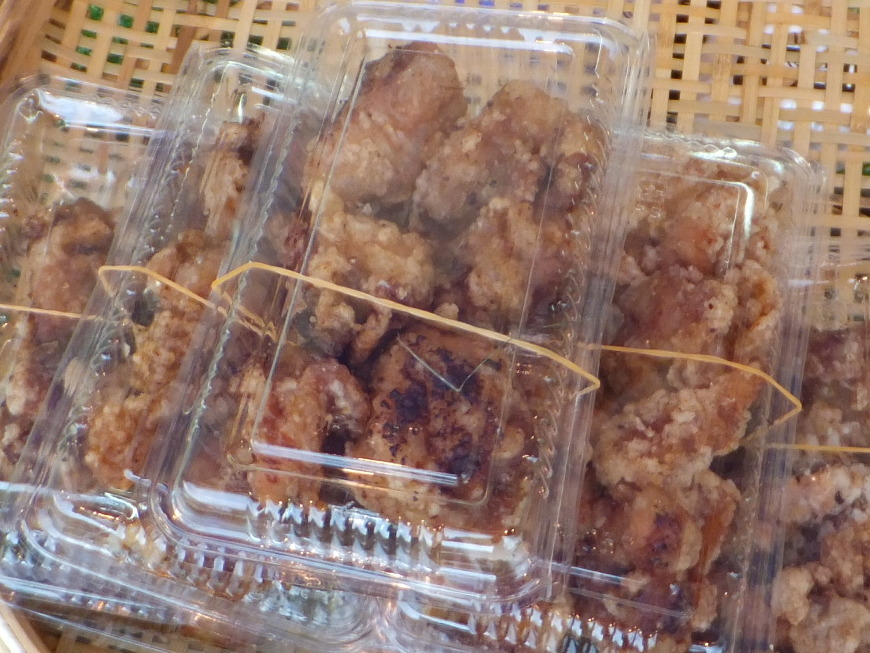
Nakatsu Karaage

== Local attractions ==
- Aonodōmon
- Fukuzawa Yukichi former residence, National Historic Site
- Komo Jinja
- Nakatsu Castle
- Rakan-ji
- Yabakei Bridge
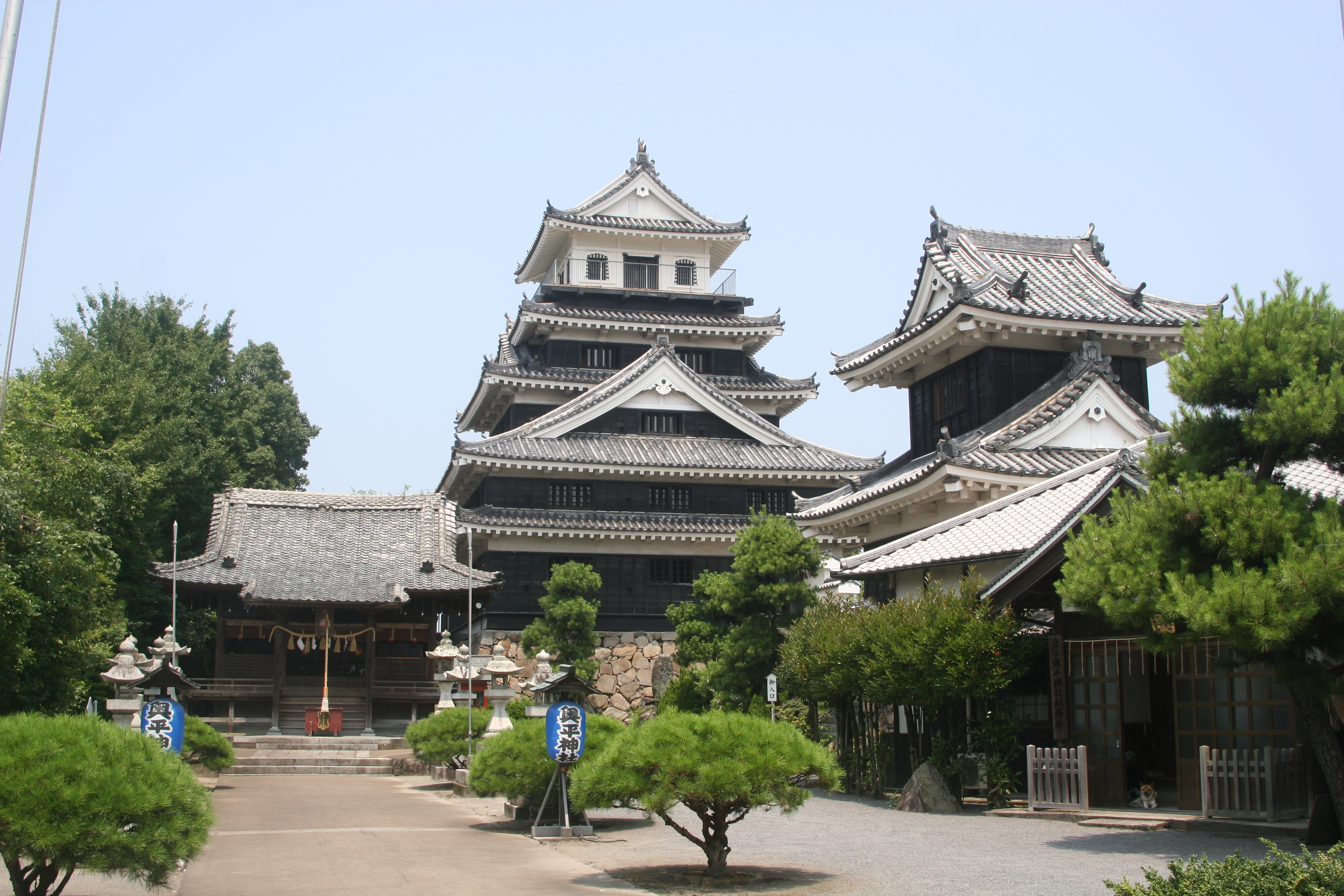
Nakatsu castle

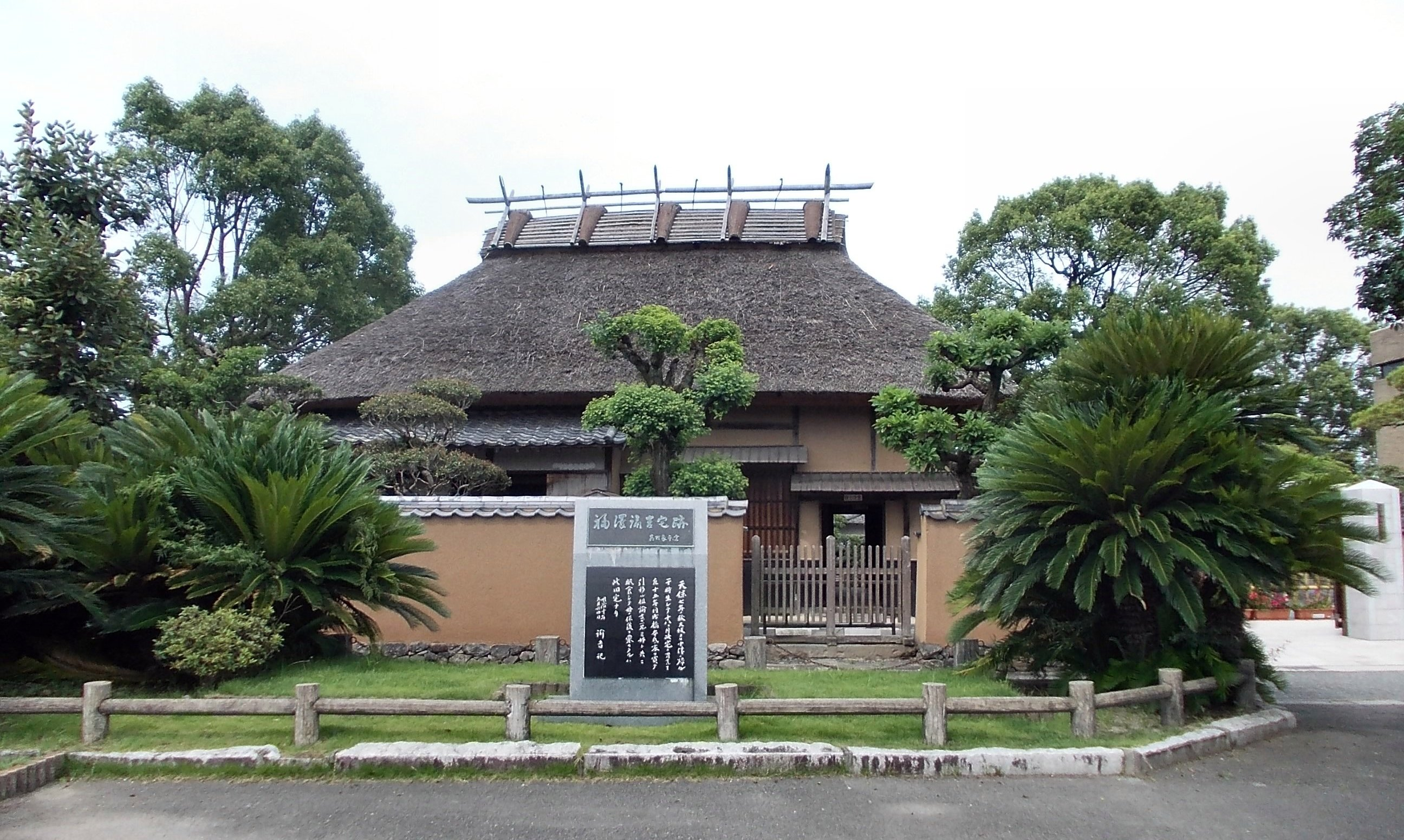
Fukuzawa Yukichi's former residence

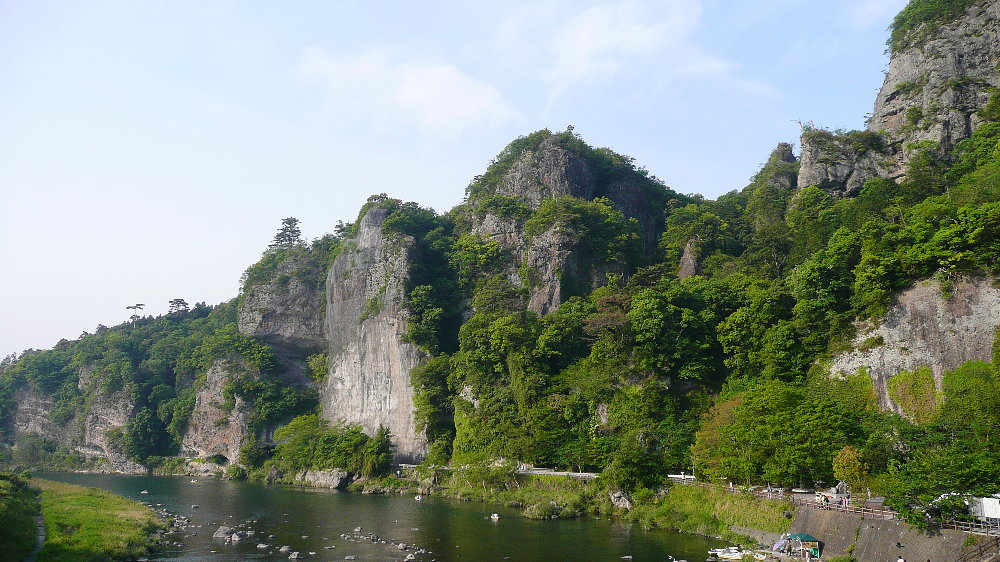
Kyōshūhō Ridge, Yabakei

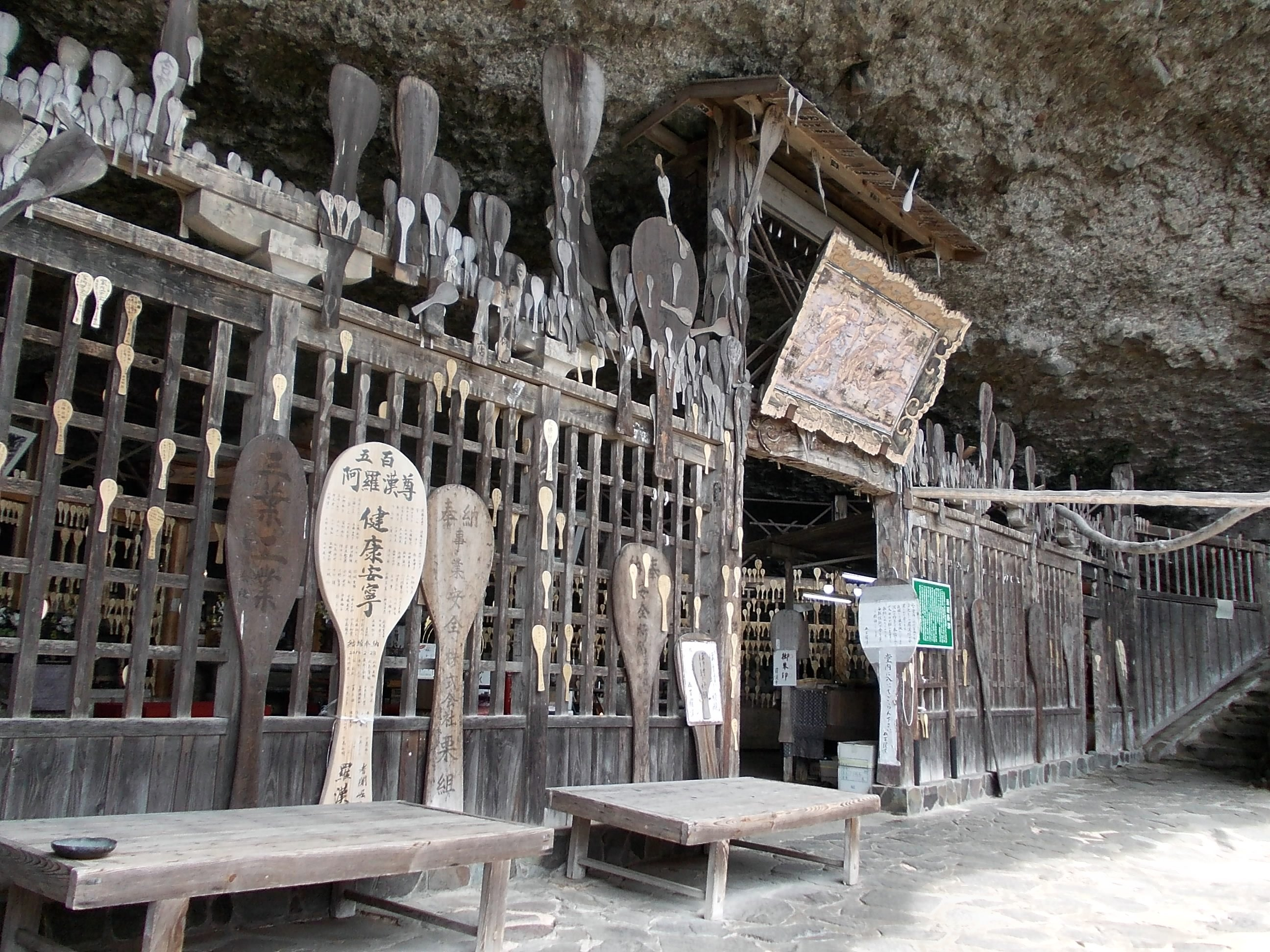
Cave of Rakan-Temple (Rakanji), built on the middle cliff of Mt. Rakan

== Festivals and events ==
The Nakatsu Gion Festival (中津祇園) is held every year in July. 13 floats and two mikoshi are paraded through the streets of Nakatsu.

Concert on the Rock was an international rock festival established in 2004 in Nakatsu. It aided UNICEF. It had J-pop, rock, salsa, cumbia, reggae, punk, dance, nu jazz, and traditional folk performances. The 2005 edition was held on May 14 and 15. Due to noise complaints, organizers decided to discontinue the event.

== Notable people from Nakatsu ==
- Risa Honda
- Mai Matsumuro
- Fuyumi Ono
- Yoshijirō Umezu, Imperial Japanese Army general
- Fukuzawa Yukichi

== See also ==
- James Murdoch, author of the famous History of Japan who taught briefly in Nakatsu junior high school (1893)
- Nakatsu Domain
