= Higashikyushu Junior College =

Private junior college in Nakatsu, Ōita, Japan

- 東九州短期大学
- Type: Private
- Established: 1899
- Total staff: 62
- Students: 80
- Location: Nakatsu, Ōita Prefecture, Japan; 33.588840°N 131.204202°E
- Website: http://www.higashikyusyu.ac.jp/

Higashikyushu Junior College (東九州短期大学, Higashi-kyūshū tanki daigaku) is a private junior college in Nakatsu, Ōita, Japan. The predecessor of the school, founded in 1899, was chartered as a women's junior college in 1967. By 2000, it became coeducational, while the present name was adopted in 2002.
