= Rakan-ji =

Buddhist temple in Japan

- 羅漢寺
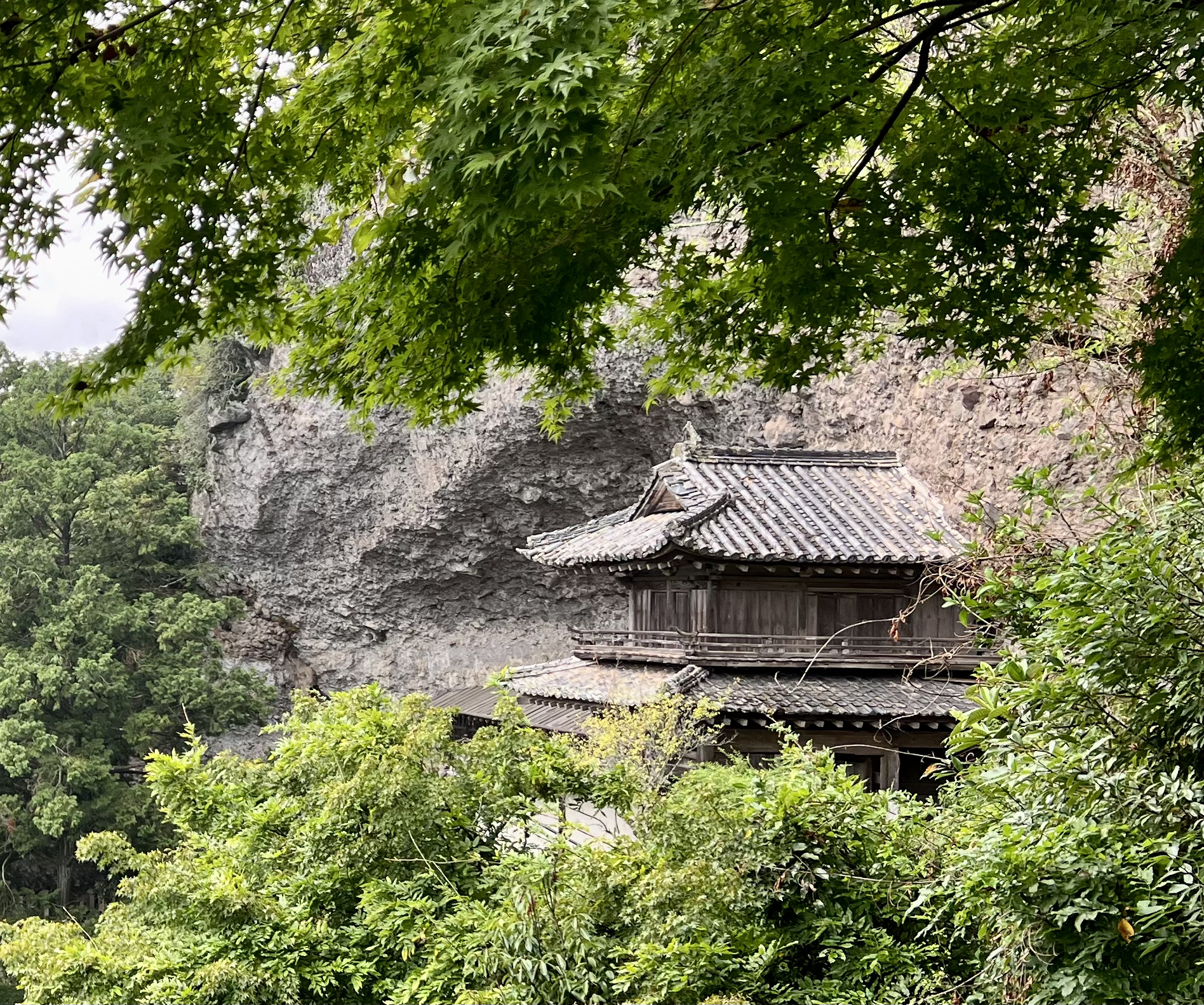
- Main gate of Rakan-ji

Religion
- Affiliation: Buddhist
- Sect: Sōtō

Location
- Location: Hon'yabakei, Nakatsu, Ōita Prefecture
- Interactive map of Rakan-ji
- Coordinates: 33°28′51.2″N 131°11′10.8″E

Architecture
- Established: 1337

Rakan-ji (羅漢寺) is a Sōtō temple in Nakatsu, Oita Prefecture, Japan. The temple stands on the mountainside of Mt. Rakan, the rocky cliff of which has countless mouths of caves. The main gate and the main hall stand directly in the rocky cliff. In the caves, over 3,700 stone Buddhas are enshrined.

The temple was established in 1337, but it was destroyed by fire in 1943. The present main hall was reconstructed in 1969.

== Gallery ==
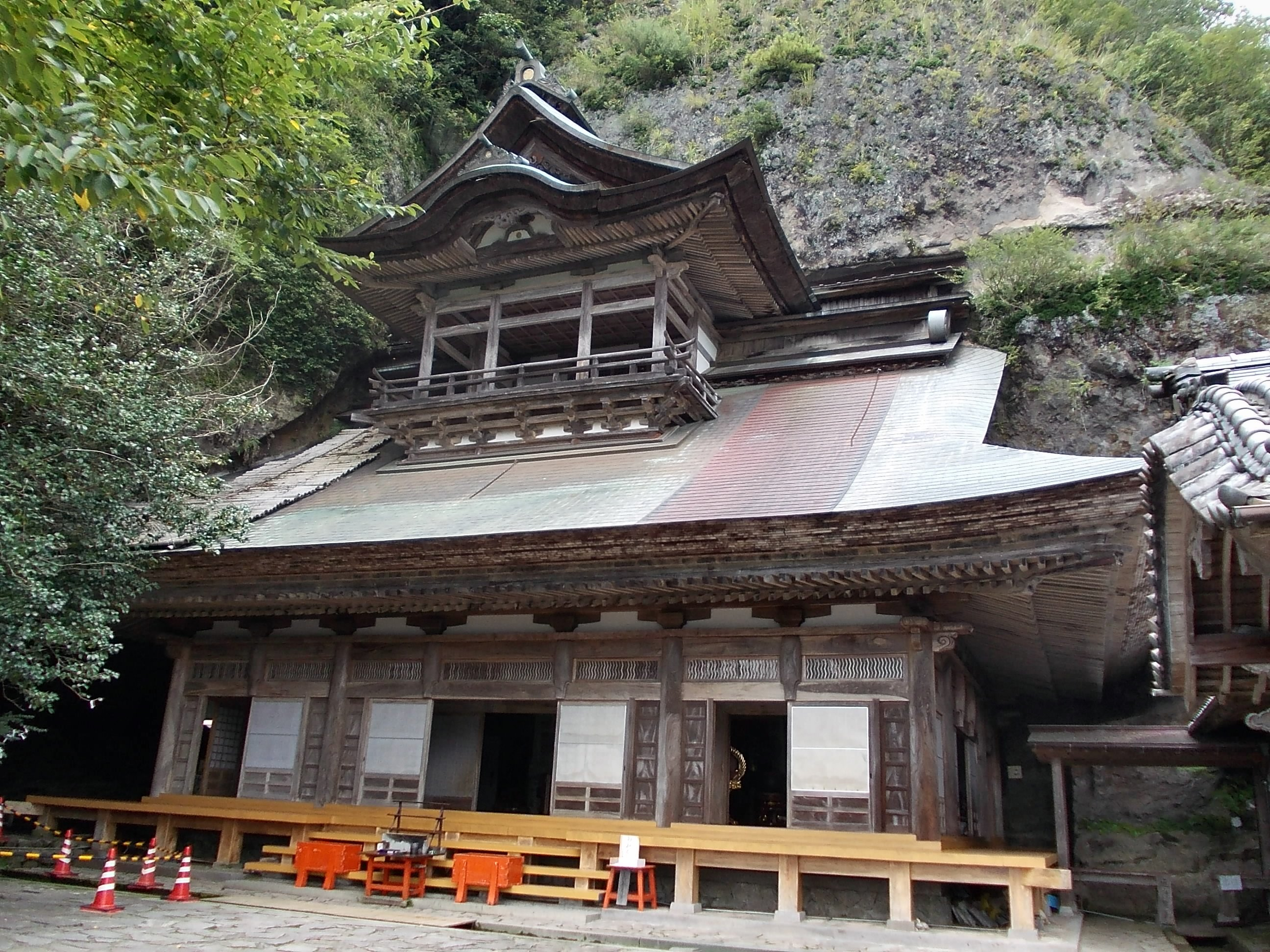
Main hall

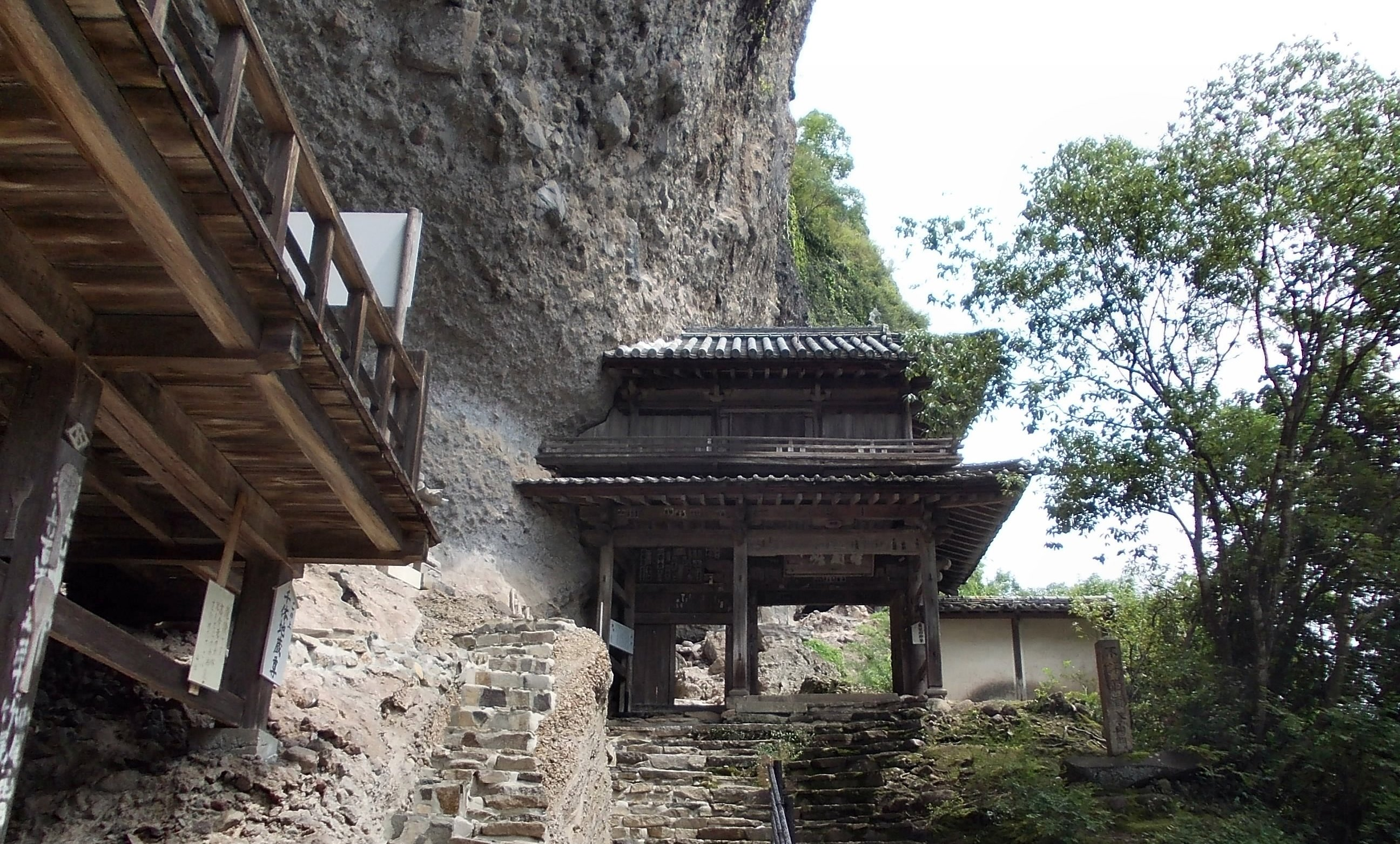
Main gate

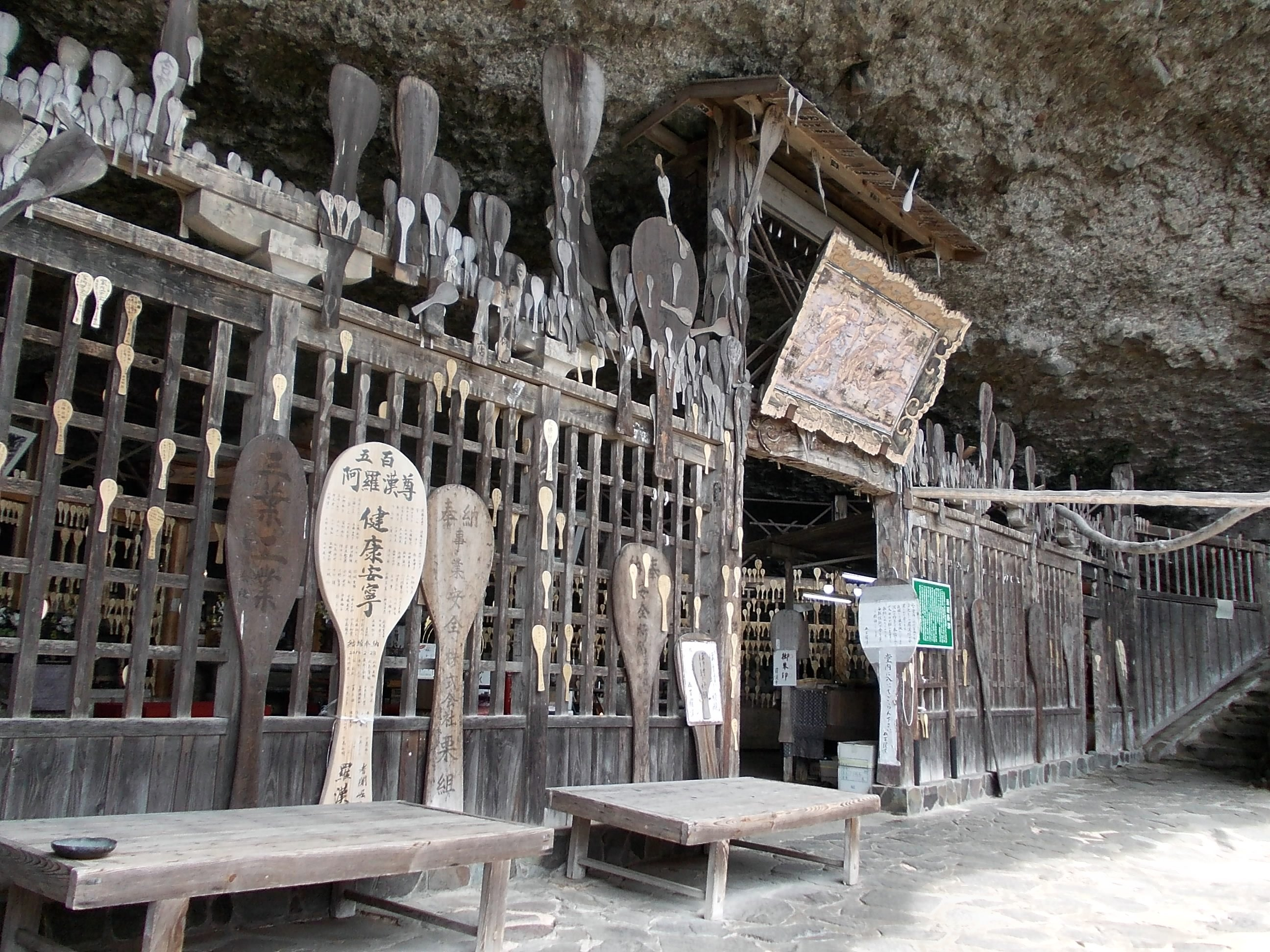
500 rakan in Murodō cave

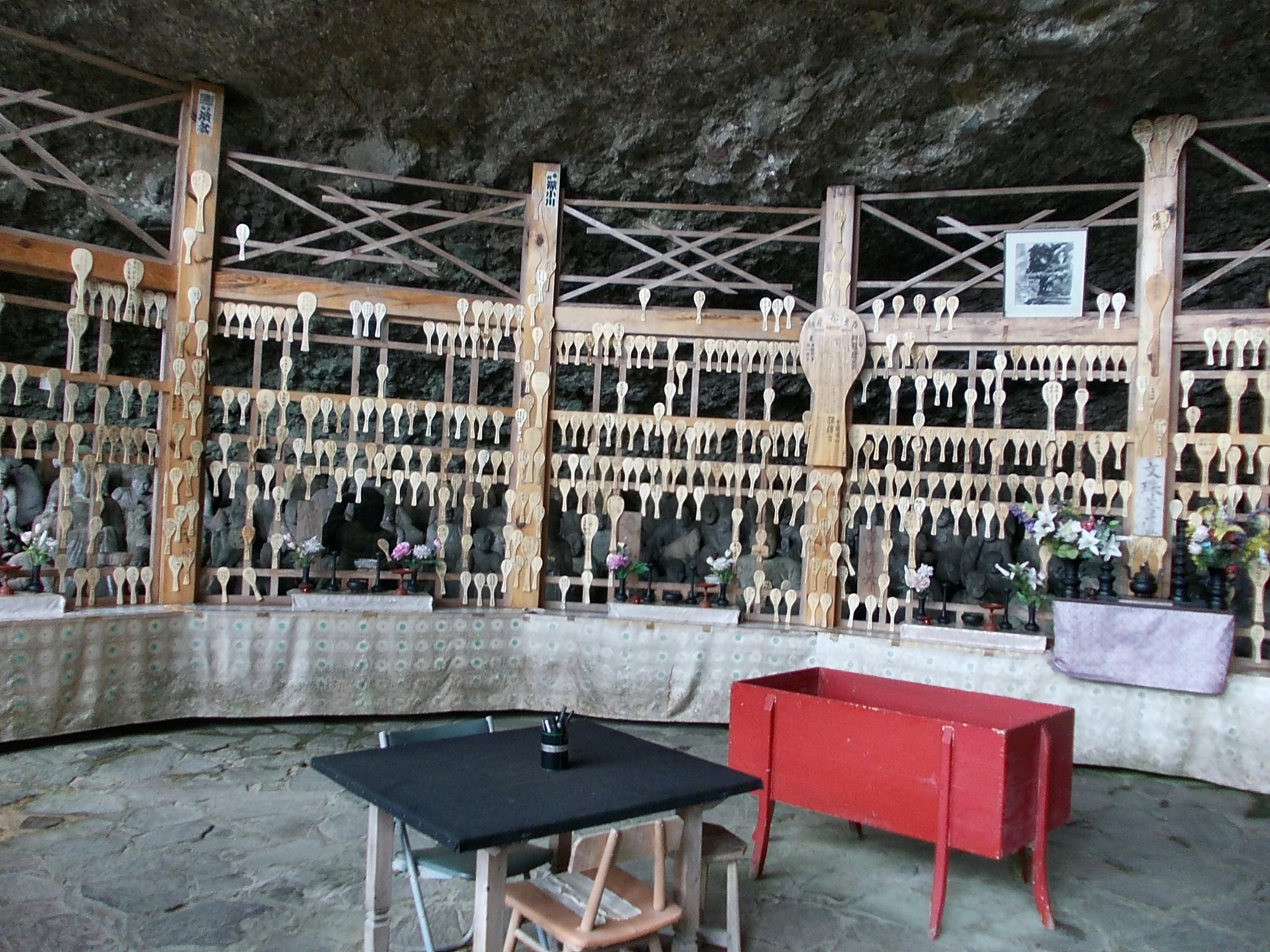

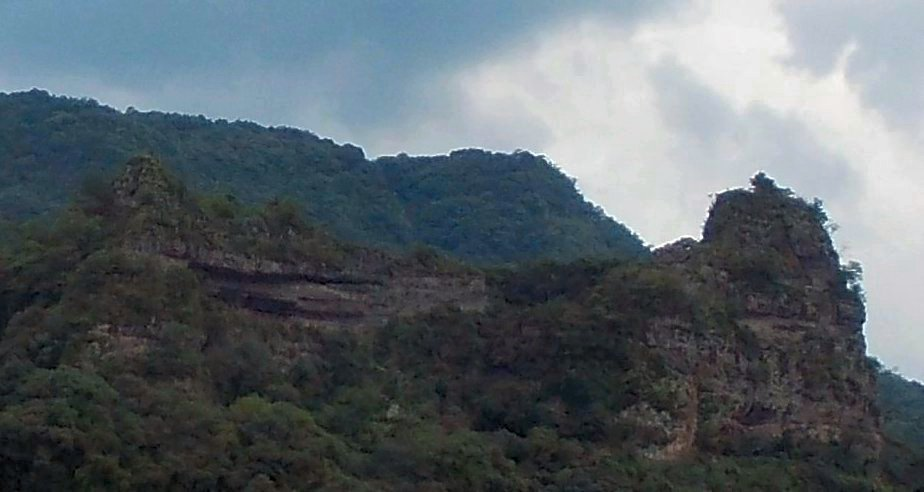
Fururakan rocky cliff
