= Megumi Ishii =

Japanese actress and politician

- 石井 めぐみ
- Born: Yoko Ishii; October 18, 1958 (age 67); Chōfu, Tokyo, Japan
- Occupations: Actress, politician
- Years active: 1979 -
- Agent: Wonder Production
- Website: Official website

Yoko Ishii (石井 葉子, Ishii Yōko; born October 18, 1958, in Chōfu, Tokyo, Japan), better known as Megumi Ishii (石井 めぐみ, Ishii Megumi) is a Japanese actress and politician who is represented by the talent agency, Wonder Production. In 2015, she was elected to the Kunitachi Municipal Assembly.

== Filmography ==
=== TV series ===
Year	Title	Role	Network	Notes
1979	Uwasa no Keiji Tomī to Matsu	Mariko Morimura	TBS	
1980	Tetsudō Kōan-kan		TV Asahi	Episode 39
1980	Tarō no Seishun	Soshi Gogatsu	NHK	
1981	Honjitsu mo Seiten Nari	Chizuko Ikeuchi	NHK	
1981	Onna Taikō-ki	Toshiie Maeda's daughter	NHK	
1981	Himitsu no Deka-chan		TBS	
1982	Danna-sama wa 18-sai		TBS	
1983	Tokugawa Ieyasu	Ofu	NHK	
1983	Ōoku	Oai	KTV	
1983	Mune Kyun Tantei-dan	Makiko Makimoto	TBS	
1984	The Sound of the Mountain		TBS	
1984	Hitozuma Sōsa-kan		ABC	
1984	The Hangman		ABC	Episode 23
1984	Aoi Hitomi no Hijiri Life		Fuji TV	
1985	Takeshi-kun, Hai!	Yamaguchi-sensei	NHK	
1985	Chichi Shimai	Erika	TBS	
1985	Ponytail wa Furimukanai		TBS	
1986	Onna Tomodachi	Kazumi Yoshikawa	TBS	
1987	Kokoro wa Lonley Kimochi wa "…"		Fuji TV	
1988	Fujio Fujiko no Yume Camera	Minayo's mother	Fuji TV	
1988	Notohantō Konyaku Ryokō Satsujin Jiken Kyoto - Kanazawa - Wakura Onsen, Misshitsu Ressha ga Hashiru…		TV Asahi	
1988	Hana no Asuka-gumi!	Kyoko Kuraku	Fuji TV	
1989	Kyōshi Binbin Monogatari		Fuji TV	
1989	Kasei-fu wa Mita!		TV Asahi	
1989	Muta Keiji-kan Jiken File		TV Asahi	
1990	Chikyu Sentai Fiveman	Midori Hoshikawa	TV Asahi	
1990	Shiroi Kyotō	Michiyo Satomi	Fuji TV	
1991	Ai to Samu no Machi		TBS	
1995	Juukou B-Fighter	Sayuri Kusanagi	TV Asahi	Episode 38
1996	Jiken Shimin no Hanketsu		TV Tokyo	Episode 7
1997	Ultraman Dyna	Satoru Kishi's mother	MBS	Episode 20
1997	Hamidashi Keiji Jōnetsu-kei	Keiko Yamauchi	TV Asahi	Episode 3
2008	Shin Kyōto Meikyū Annai	Satomi Fukamachi	TV Asahi	Episode 7
2008	Minatochō Ninjō Nurse	Kimiko Yamauchi	TV Tokyo	
2009	Ijiwaru Bāsan	Junko Ichiwari	Fuji TV	
2009	Koiuta Drama SP		TBS	Episode 1
2010	Second Virgin	Yoko Mukai	NHK	Episode 2
2011	100 no Shikaku o Motsu Onna: Futari no Batsuichi Satsujin Sōsa	Sanae Ohara	ABC	
2013	Kyotaro Nishimura Travel Mystery	Kayo Morishita	TV Asahi	
2013	Totsukawa Keibu Series	Yoko Wakita	TBS	

=== Films ===
Year	Title	Role	Notes
1979	Kindaichi Kosuke no Bōken	Daughter of costume drama shooting scene	
	Yasha Ke-chi		
1995	Neyuki to Keru Koro		
1996	Donguri no Ie		
2003	Winning Path		
2006	Fude-ko sono Ai: Tenshi no Piano		
2008	Furusato o Kudasai		
2009	Yuzuriha		
2009	Drive Me to the Sea	Mizue Asano	
2010	Coach		
