= Risa Honda =

Japanese idol

- 本田 理沙
- Born: 27 May 1971 (age 55); Nakatsu, Ōita, Japan
- Occupations: Gravure idol; actress; singer
- Years active: 1988–
- Known for
- Modeling information
- Height: 154 cm (5 ft 1 in)
- Agency: Prism

Risa Honda (本田 理沙, Honda Risa; born 27 May 1971) is a Japanese idol singer, actress and tarento who has appeared in a number of television series, variety shows, videos, and magazines. Her real name is Kozue Honda (本田 こずえ, Honda Kozue).

She was born in Nakatsu, Ōita. She is represented with the agency Prism.

== Filmography ==
=== TV dramas ===
Dates	Title	Role	Network	Production	Notes
1988	Momoiro Gakuentoshi Sengen!!: Akebonobashi Misuzuya Gakuen		CX		
1988	Hana no Asuka-gumi!		CX		
1990	Tennis Shōjo Yume Densetsu! Ai to Kyoko		CX		
1991	Eiga mitaina Koi shitai Topaz		TX		
1991	Yonimo Kimyōna Monogatari Video Drug		CX		
1991	Kamakura Renai Iinkai 8th A Imōto no Wedding Dress		TBS		
1992	Hagure Keiji Junjōha V	Rumi Matsuki	EX	Toei	Episode 13
1992	Uradeka		ABC		Episode 8
1992	Sasurai Keiji Ryojō-hen V		EX	Toei	Episode 12
Nov 1992 – Jan 1993	Fundamental		TX		
	Kayō Suspense Gekijō 20th Anniversary Bengoshi Ayuko Takabayashi 28: Paris kara Todoita Satsui		NTV		
6 Dec 1992	Niji ga Deta! 8: Ramen no Yuge		TBS		
28 Mar 1993	Monkey		NTV		
1993	Mei Bugyō: Tōyama no Kin-san	Oito	EX		5th Series Episode 7
21 Feb 1994	Genkotsu Oshō wa Mei Tantei		TBS		Getsuyō Drama Special series
1994	Hagure Keiji Junjōha VII		EX		Episode 22
9 Jun 1994	Mei Bugyō: Tōyama no Kin-san	Okiku	EX		8th Series Episode 1
1995	Kaze no Keiji Tokyo Hatsu!	Eiko Matsui	EX		Episode 9
1995	Mei Bugyō: Tōyama no Kin-san	Okei	EX		7th Series Episode 7
	Yan Mama Boogie				
1996	Taikyoku no Ten: Renai Nito Monogatari		CX		Episode 18
1997	Tōyama no Kin-san vs Onna nezumi		EX		Episode 5
1999	Christmas no Kiseki		FBS, NTV		
3 Jul 2001	Bengoshi Ayuko Takabayashi 20 Shūnenkinen Sakuhin Series Dai 28-dan: Paris kara Todoita Satsui		NTV		
	Kingyo no Fun				
2 Feb 2013	Tuna Girl!: Ashita ni Yale		FBS		

=== Variety programmes ===
Title	Network
Ken Shimura no Daijōbudā	CX
Tokyo Yellow Page	TBS
All-Star Thanksgiving	TBS
Super Mario Club	TX
Piropiro	CX

=== Radio programmes ===
Dates	Title	Network	Ref.
1 Jul 2010 – 29 Jun 2017	Risa Honda no Mamma Mia!	Noas FM	
7 Sep 2011 –	Bishu Sho: Honda	Noas FM	
2 Apr 2015 –	Time Slider	Noas FM	

=== Films ===
Year	Title	Ref.
1991	Shōwa Tetsu-fū-den: Nihonkai	

== Videography ==
=== Videos ===
Title
So What
High Heel Gang
Kansai Mutekikai
Ojōsama Gokudō Kumichō
Tokkō! Yan Mama Jingi
Gokudō Hana no Ran: Ane vs Anego
Pachinko Dan-chan
Totte oki Virgin Love Dōtei Monogatari 3
Shōwa Tetsu-fū-den: Nihonkai
Deep
Makoto Kitano × Yoshikazu Takeuchi “Koikuchi” Talk Radio

=== DVD ===
Date	Title	Publisher	Starring
1 Aug 2004	Idol o Mekke!! AMS-04	DVD Maker	Risa Honda, Yuko Nitō, Satomi Kawai, etc.
10 Oct 2004	Idol o Mekke!! AMS-02	DVD Maker	Risa Honda, Miwa Kawagoe, Hikaru Nishida, etc.
15 Dec 2006	Pachinko Mushuku II-kō no Gambler Dan Jirō	Line Communications	Riki Takeuchi, Kentaro Nakakura, Risa Honda
25 Jul 2008	Ojōsama Gokudō Kumichō	Happinet Pictures	
30 Aug 2008	Makoto Kitano × Yoshikazu Takeuchi "Koikuchi"	Victor Entertainment	Makoto Kitano, Yoshikazu Takeuchi, Risa Honda, etc.
25 May 2009	Risa Honda	GM Museum Soft	Risa Honda
25 Oct 2009	burnish	Air Control	Risa Honda
22 Jan 2010	Ren	Japan Media Supply Co., Ltd.	Risa Honda
7 Apr 2010	OL no Koi –S to M–	Attackers	Risa Goto, Risa Honda, Misaki Shiraishi
7 May 2010	OL no Himitsu –S to M–	Attackers	Risa Honda, Misaki Shiraishi
7 Aug 2010	Rashin	Attackers	Risa Honda

== Discography ==
=== Singles ===
Date	Title
1 Jul 1988	Lesson 2 / Innocent
21 Oct 1988	Ichigo ga Porori / Flapper
8 Mar 1989	Maji! / Maji 2
1 Jul 1989	Sasotte Iriguchi furuete Deguchi / Yokohama Kotokunibito
1 Nov 1989	Yōshanaku Itoshite / Seventeen's Heart
21 May 1990	Documentary / Umi
22 May 1991	a-za-mi / Itoshi teru...

=== Albums ===
Date	Title	Songs	Notes
30 Apr 1989	Me Her Scramble	Me Her Scramble; Lesson 2; Ichigo ga Porori; Maji!; Kagami no Watashi to Face To Face; Aru Asa Totsuzen ni; Ta-wa-mu-re; Summer Poison; Ichigo ga Porori Part 2; Suppin	Initial version with VHS software containing video clips

== Bibliography ==
Date	Title	Photographer	Date	Notes
Nov 1988	Deka Dunk ichigo Hakusho		Shueisha	DUNK special edit Mook book
Aug 1989	Ma Cher ie	Koji Inomoto	Gakken	
Dec 1989	Fureai	Seiichi Nomura	Tis	
May 1991	Shōjo ga Otona	Seiichi Nomura	Wani Books	
Sep 1992	Invest	Seiichi Nomura	Takeshobo	
Dec 1992	Ichiban Suki de ite	Seiichi Nomura	Tis	
May 1993	Ichiban Suki de ite		DreamWorks Publishing	Reprint edition
Jul 1993	Ikashita Musume	Koji Inomoto	Wanimagazine	
Aug 1993	Heart–Fureai		DreamWorks Publishing	Reprint edition
Aug 1994	Kealani	Masashige Ogata	Bunkasha	
Dec 1995	Cheese Cheese!!	Toshihiko Imamura	Bunkasha	
Oct 1996	R	Yoshida Muto	Bunkasha	
Mar 1999	Risa Time Again	Morihiro Mori	Sankū Shuppan	
