= Anji Domain =

Japanese feudal domain located in Harima Province

Anji Domain 安志藩
- under Tokugawa shogunate Japan
- 1716–1871
- Capital: Anji jin'ya
- Area
  - Coordinates: 34°59′25.13″N 134°35′39.62″E
- Government
  - Type: Daimyō
- Historical era: Edo period
  - Established: 1716
  - Disestablished: 1871
- Today part of: part of Hyōgo Prefecture

Location of Anji jin'ya
Anji Domain (Japan)

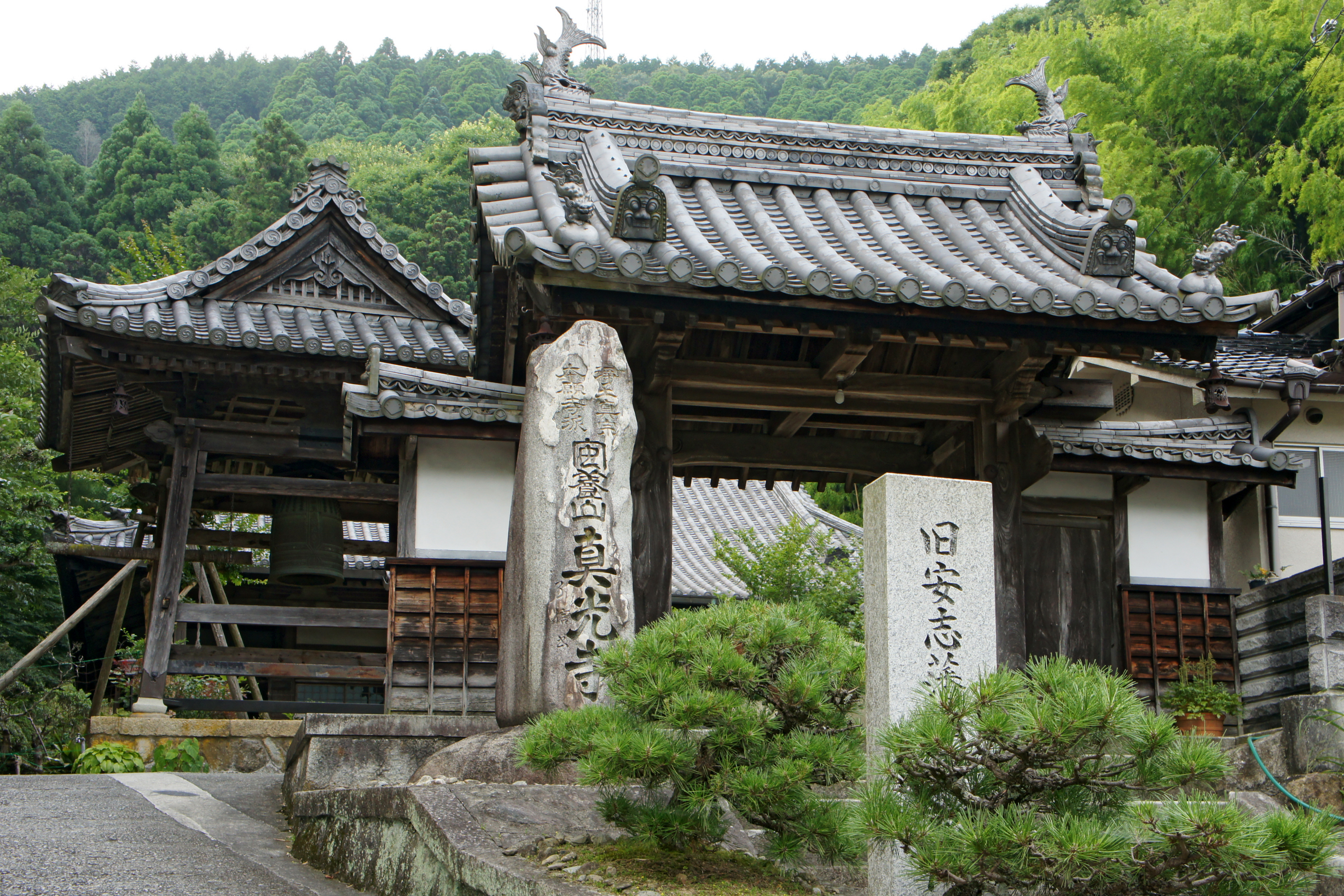
Anji jin'ya

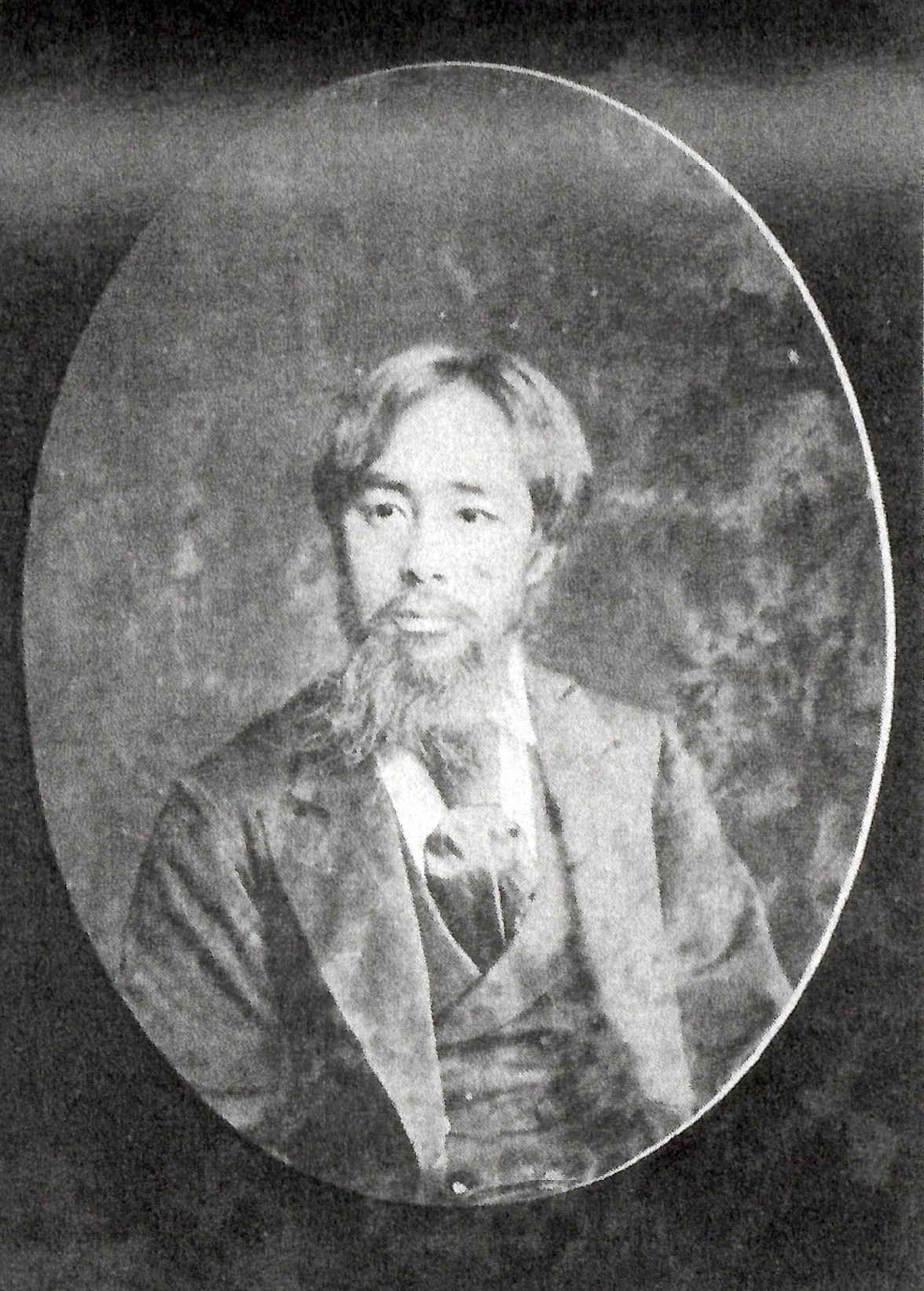
Ogasawara Sadazane, final daimyō of Anji

Anji Domain (安志藩, Anji-han) was a feudal domain under the Tokugawa shogunate of Edo period Japan, located in Harima Province in what is now the southwestern portion of modern-day Hyōgo Prefecture. It was centered around the Anji jin'ya which was located in what is now the city of Himeji, Hyōgo and was controlled by a cadet branch fudai daimyō Ogasawara clan throughout all of its history.

== History ==
In 1716, the 5th daimyō of Nakatsu Domain in Buzen Province, Ogasawara Nakasato died at the age of five. As he had no heir, this would normally be cause for attainder; however, in recognition of the death in combat of one his ancestors at the Siege of Osaka, the Tokugawa shogunate decided to appoint his uncle, Ogasawara Nagaoki as daimyō, but to reduce his kokudaka to 10,000 koku and to relocate his seat to Anji. Ogasawara Nagaoki was weak health and retired at the age of 19 without heir, but he adopted the son of Ogasawara Tadamoto of Kokura Domain, Ogasawara Nagamitsu, as his successor. Afterwards, the domain was regarded as if it was a subordinate domain of Kokura. Due to these strong ties, the domain fought in the Chōshū expeditions against Chōshū Domain, bu with the start of the Boshin War defected to the Imperial side. In 1871, with the abolition of the han system, the domain became Anji Prefecture, which was merged with Shikama Prefecture, which in turn became part of Hyōgo Prefecture.

The clan was ennobled with the kazoku peerage title of shishaku (viscount) in 1884.

== Holdings at the end of the Edo period ==
As with most domains in the han system, Anji Domain consisted of several discontinuous territories calculated to provide the assigned kokudaka, based on periodic cadastral surveys and projected agricultural yields.

- Harima Province
  - 18 villages in Ako District
  - 11 villages in Sayo District
  - 18 villages in Shisō District

== List of daimyō ==
#	Name	Tenure	Courtesy title	Court Rank	kokudaka
Ogasawara clan, 1716-1871 (Fudai)
1	Ogasawara Nagaoki (小笠原長興)	1716 - 1730	-none-	-none-	10,000 koku
2	Ogasawara Nagamichi (小笠原長逵)	1730 - 1770	Shinano-no-kami (信濃守)	Junior 5th Rank, Lower Grade (従五位下)	10,000 koku
3	Ogasawara Nagatame (小笠原長為)	1770 - 1782	Shinano-no-kami (信濃守)	Junior 5th Rank, Lower Grade (従五位下)	10,000 koku
4	Ogasawara Nagayoshi (小笠原長禎)	1782 - 1823	Shinano-no-kami (信濃守)	Junior 5th Rank, Lower Grade (従五位下)	10,000 koku
5	Ogasawara Nagatake (小笠原長武)	1823 - 1832	Shinano-no-kami (信濃守)	Junior 5th Rank, Lower Grade (従五位下)	10,000 koku
6	Ogasawara Tadayoshi (建部長教)	1832 - 1860	Shinano-no-kami (信濃守)	Junior 5th Rank, Lower Grade (従五位下)	10,000 koku
7	Ogasawara Tadazane (小笠原貞孚)	1860 - 1871	Shinano-no-kami (信濃守)	Junior 5th Rank, Lower Grade (従五位下)	10,000 koku

== See also ==
- List of Han
- Abolition of the han system
