= Yamakuni, Ōita =

Yamakuni 山国町
- Town
- Interactive map of Yamakuni
- Country: Japan
- Prefecture: Ōita Prefecture
- District: Shimoge District

Government
  - Type: Town Government
  - Body: Town Assembly

Area
  - Total: 119.85 km^{2} (46.27 sq mi)
  - Land: 119.85 km^{2} (46.27 sq mi)
  - Water: 0 km^{2} (0 sq mi)

Population (2003)
  - Total: 3,317
  - Density: 27.68/km^{2} (71.7/sq mi)
- Time zone: UTC+9:00 (JST)
- ISO 3166 code: JP-44
- Merged into Nakatsu on March 1, 2005.

Yamakuni (山国町, Yamakuni-machi) was a town located in Shimoge District, Ōita Prefecture, Japan.

As of 2003, the town had an estimated population of 3,317 and the density of 27.68 persons per km^{2}. The total area was 119.85 km^{2}.

On March 1, 2005 Yamakuni, along with the towns of Hon'yabakei and Yabakei, and the village of Sankō (all from Shimoge District), was merged into the expanded city of Nakatsu.

Yamakuni is best known for Core Yamakuni (（コアやまくに), a large municipal building featuring an ice-skating rink in the winter. It has a junior high school, Yamakuni Chugakko (山国中学校), and an elementary school, Misato Shogakko (三郷小学校). As part of its fusion with Nakatsu City, two elementary schools, Tsukinoki (槻木) and Mizobe (溝部), were closed and their students transferred to Misato in 2005.

Despite the former town's political ties to Nakatsu City, it is geographically closer to Hita City to its west. It also tends to look to bordering Fukuoka Prefecture more than to the distant prefectural capital of Oita City.

Yamakuni is notable for its contribution to Japanese mythology in the form of the Yamaguni Yetii myth. This tale, widely regarded as fictional, recounts the story of a local hunter who allegedly stalked, captured and skinned the famous Yetii, and mounted its hide above his hearth. The tale is recalled in many local folk songs, poems and word-of-mouth folklore.
