= Hana no Asuka-gumi! =

Japanese media franchise

花のあすか組! (Hana no Asuka-gumi!)
- Genre: Drama
- Manga
- Written by: Satosumi Takaguchi
- Published by: Kadokawa Shoten
- Magazine: Monthly Asuka
- Original run: 1985 – 1995
- Volumes: 27+6
Further information
Original video animation
Shin Kabukicho Story Hana no Asuka-gumi!
Directed by	Atsutoshi Umezawa
Produced by	Kadokawa Shoten; Tohokushinsha Film; Toei Video Company
Written by	Kenji Terada
Studio	Toei Animation
Released	June 10, 1987
Runtime	48 minutes
Television drama
Directed by	Hideo Tanaka; Toshio Ōi; Morio Maejima
Produced by	Takashi Ishihara; Osamu Tezuka
Written by	Junki Takegami; Sukehiro Tomita; Kazuhiko Gōdo; Yūichirō Tatsumi; Kenji Kuwata
Music by	Toshiaki Tsushima
Studio	Toei Company; Fuji TV
Original network	Fuji Television
Original run	April 11, 1988 – September 26, 1988
Episodes	23
Live-action film
Directed by	Yōichi Sai
Produced by	Haruki Kadokawa; Kazuyuki Satō; Yū Ōkawa; Sōgaku Koga
Written by	Yōichi Sai
Music by	Masahide Sakuma
Studio	Toho
Released	August 13, 1988
Runtime	100 minutes
Original video animation
Hana no Asuka-gumi! Lonely Cats Battle Royale
Directed by	Atsutoshi Umezawa
Produced by	Noriaki Ikeda; Akira Sasaki
Written by	Kenji Terada
Music by	Kenji Kawai
Studio	Toei Animation
Released	March 23, 1990
Runtime	52 minutes
Audio drama
Written by	Yōko Sugimoto
Original run	October 23, 1991 – April 23, 1992
Episodes	2
Audio drama
Hana no Asuka-gumi! Gaiden
Directed by	Kazuya Torishima
Written by	Kazuya Torishima
Released	March 20, 1997
Manga
New Hana no Asuka-gumi! (新・花のあすか組!, Shin Hana no Asuka-gumi!)
Written by	Satosumi Takaguchi
Published by	Feel Young (web comic)
Original run	2003 – 2009
Manga
Written by	Satosumi Takaguchi
Original run	2007 – 2008
Live-action film
Hana no Asuka-gumi! Neo
Directed by	Yutaka Tsurita
Released	April 25, 2009
Manga
Hana no Asukagumi! BS-hen
Written by	Satosumi Takaguchi
Published by	Feel Comics
Published	August 9, 2018
Volumes	2
Manga
Hana no Asukagumi! Infinity
Written by	Satosumi Takaguchi
Published by	Shodensha
Magazine	Manga Jam
Original run	July 9, 2019 – November 7, 2021
Volumes	9

Hana no Asuka-gumi! (Japanese: 花のあすか組!; lit. "The Glorious Asuka Gang!") is a Japanese manga by Satosumi Takaguchi serialized in Monthly Asuka. It was adapted into a television drama series, two live-action films, two OVAs, and two drama CDs. It is one of the series with delinquent girls (sukeban) popular in the 1980s. Two new manga series were published, one from 2003 to 2009 and the other from 2007 to 2008.

In July 2019, a new manga series was released called Hana no Asukagumi! Infinity and it ended on November 7, 2021.

== Reception ==
More than 10 million copies of the manga had been sold by November 2005.

== Media adaptations ==
=== Anime ===
There are two OVAs: Shin Kabukicho Story Hana no Asuka-gumi!, released on June 12, 1987 and Hana no Asuka-gumi! Lonely Cats Battle Royale, released in 1990. Lonely Cats Battle Royale was thought to be lost until an anonymous individual mailed a tape of the OVA to anime enthusiast and YouTuber Kenny Lauderdale in 2019.

=== TV drama ===
Hana no Asuka-gumi!
- Starring: Megumi Odaka; Natsuki Ozawa; Hikari Ishida
- Narrated by: Ryou Nakanishi
- Ending theme: "Get a Chance" sung by BaBe "BLUE WIND" sung by Megumi Odaka "Kanashige Dane" sung by ASUKA-GUMI
- Composer: Toshiaki Tsushima
- Country of origin: Japan
- Original language: Japanese
- No. of episodes: 23

Production
- Production company: Toei Company

Original release
- Network: Fuji Television
- Release: April 11 – September 26, 1988

A television drama series was broadcast on Fuji Television from April 11 to September 26, 1988.

==== Cast ====
- Megumi Odaka as Asuka Kuraku
- Natsuki Ozawa as Miko Dōmoto
- Hikari Ishida as Harumi Kōzuki
- Shiori Sakura as Hibari
- Risa Honda as Kasuga
- Masami Hayami as Kaze
- Mika Chiba as Hayashi
- Emi Wakui as Hi
- Kyōko Ninagawa as Yama
- Megumi Ishii as Kyōko Kuraku

=== Live action films ===
Two live action films have been produced: the first, directed by Yōichi Sai and released on August 13, 1988 and the second, Hana no Asuka-gumi! Neo, directed by Yutaka Tsurita and released on April 25, 2009.
