= Nakatsu Castle =

Nakatsu Castle 中津城
- Nakatsu, Ōita Prefecture, Japan
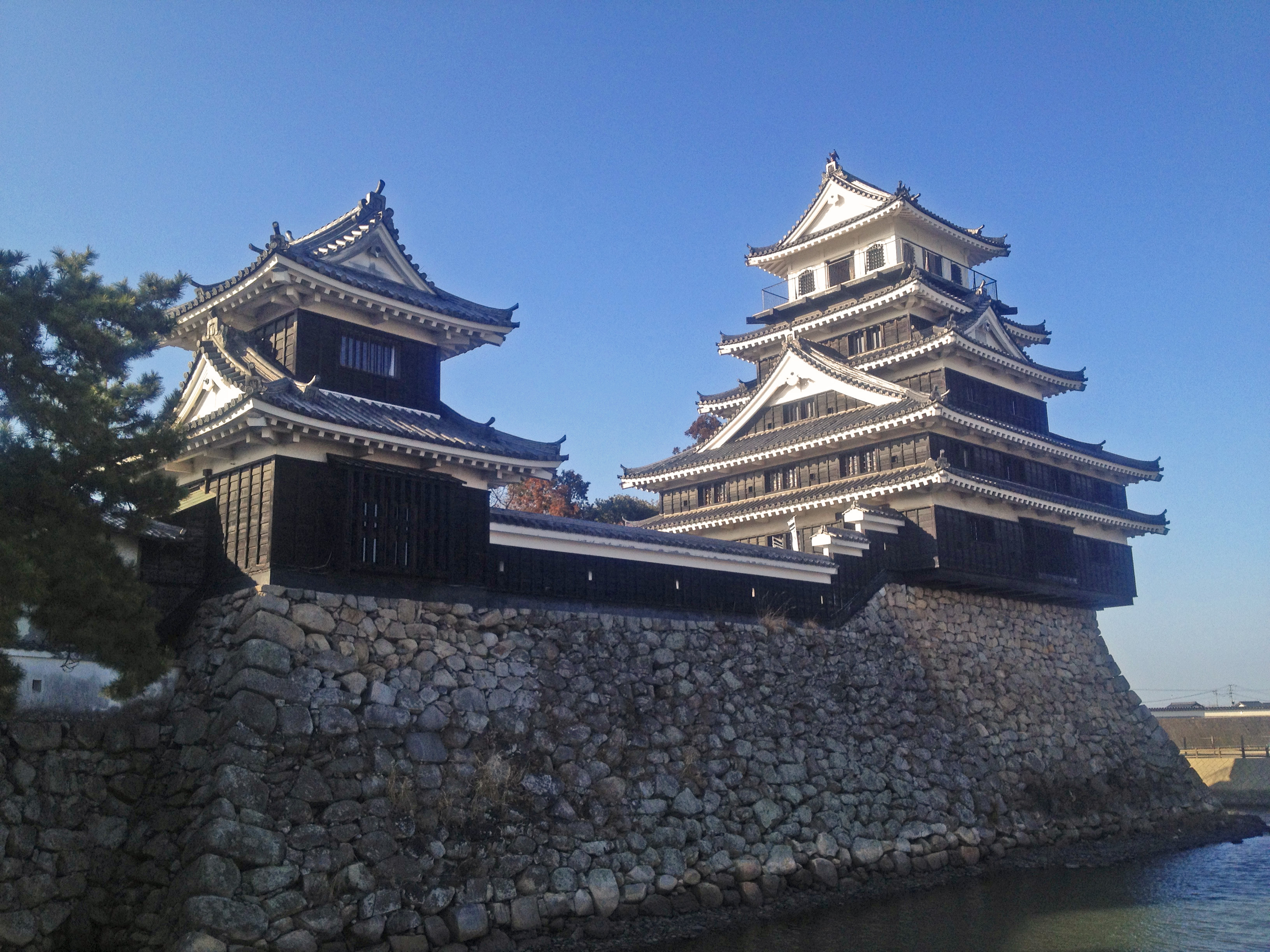
- Nakatsu Castle

Site information
- Type: Japanese castle

Location
- Coordinates: 33°36′23″N 131°11′10″E

Site history
- Built: 1587
- Built by: Kuroda Yoshitaka

Nakatsu Castle (中津城, Nakatsu-jō) is a Japanese castle in the city of Nakatsu in Ōita Prefecture. It is known as one of the three mizujiro, or "castles on the sea", in Japan, with Takamatsu Castle in Kagawa Prefecture and Imabari Castle in Ehime Prefecture.

== History ==
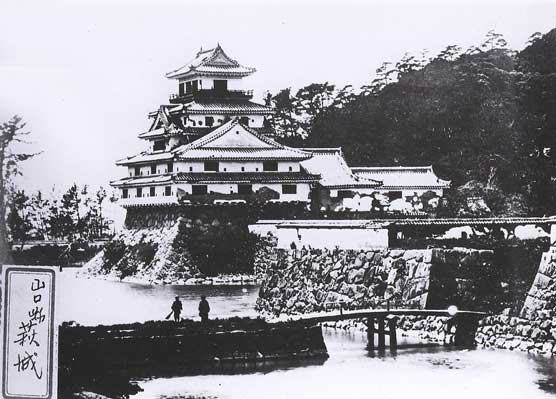
Hagi Castle, on which Nakatsu was modeled

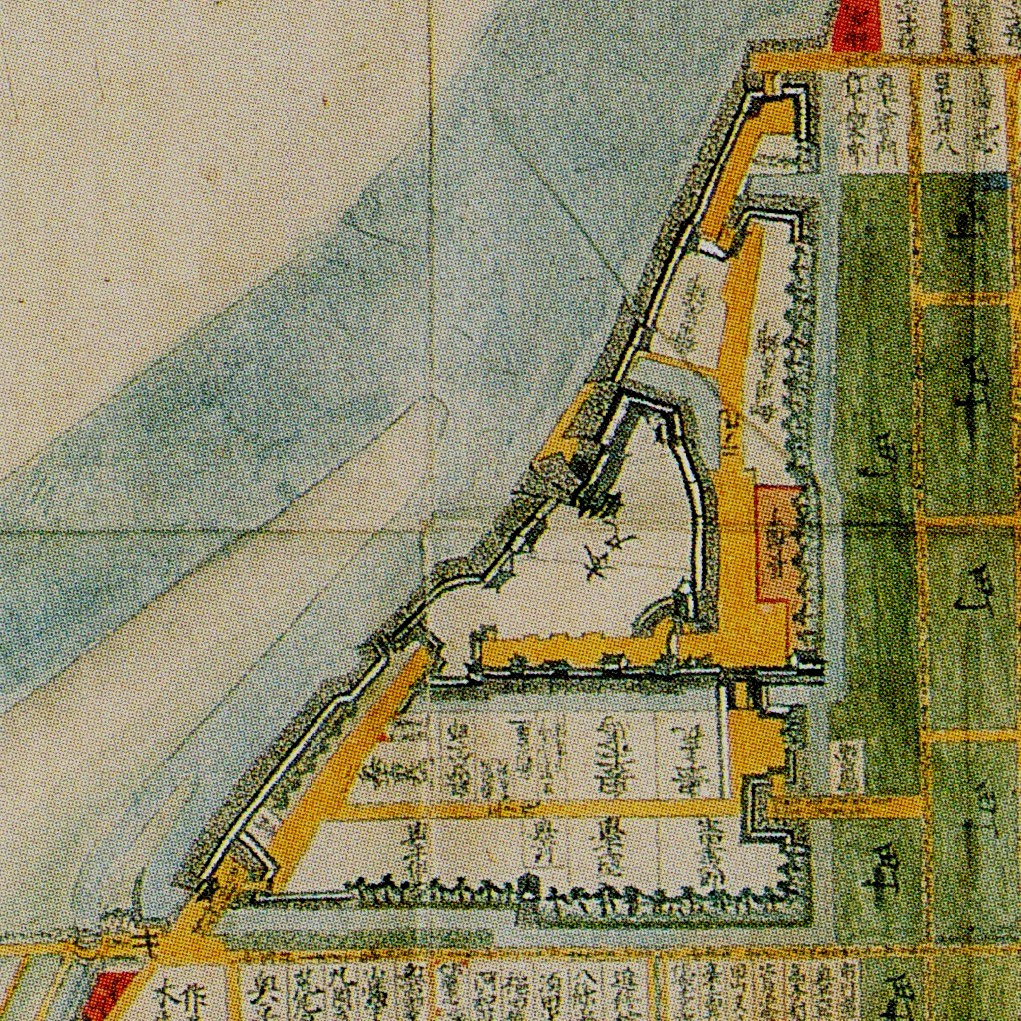
Layout of Nakatsu Castle

Construction began under the rule of Daimyō Kuroda Yoshitaka in 1587, when he was made the governor of the region by Toyotomi Hideyoshi for his help in the Kyūshū Campaign. Yoshitaka was rewarded with greater lands in Fukuoka after the Battle of Sekigahara and was replaced by Daimyō Hosokawa Tadaoki, who completed the construction.

Tadaoki moved to Kokura Castle, when it was built, and Nakatsu castle was given to his son Hosokawa Tadatoshi. The castle was taken over by the Ogasawara clan and subsequently by the Okudaira Clan in 1717. It was abandoned in 1871 after the Meiji Restoration and the structure was destroyed in a fire during the Satsuma Rebellion in 1877.

The present castle was built in 1964 by the descendants of the Okudaira samurai clan and was modeled on Hagi Castle.

== Architecture ==
The total area of the castle grounds is about 78,000 sq. m and the structure was built in the shape of an open fan. The castle is bordered by a traditional stone wall and a moat. The building is a steel-frame five-storied structure, and the top floor is an observation deck. The castle draws salt water from the nearby Seto Inland Sea to fill the moat.

== Legacy ==
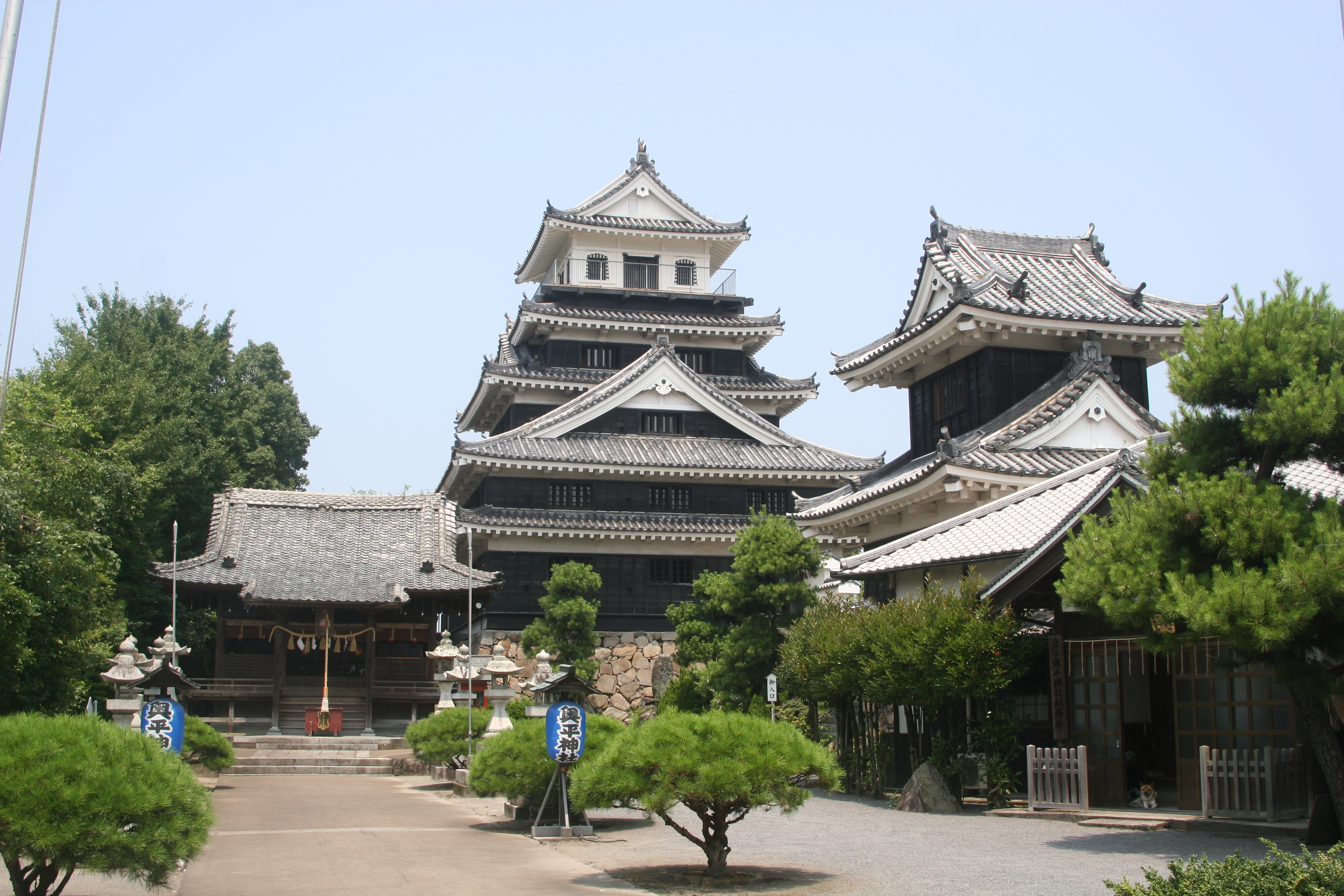
The main castle and the shrine

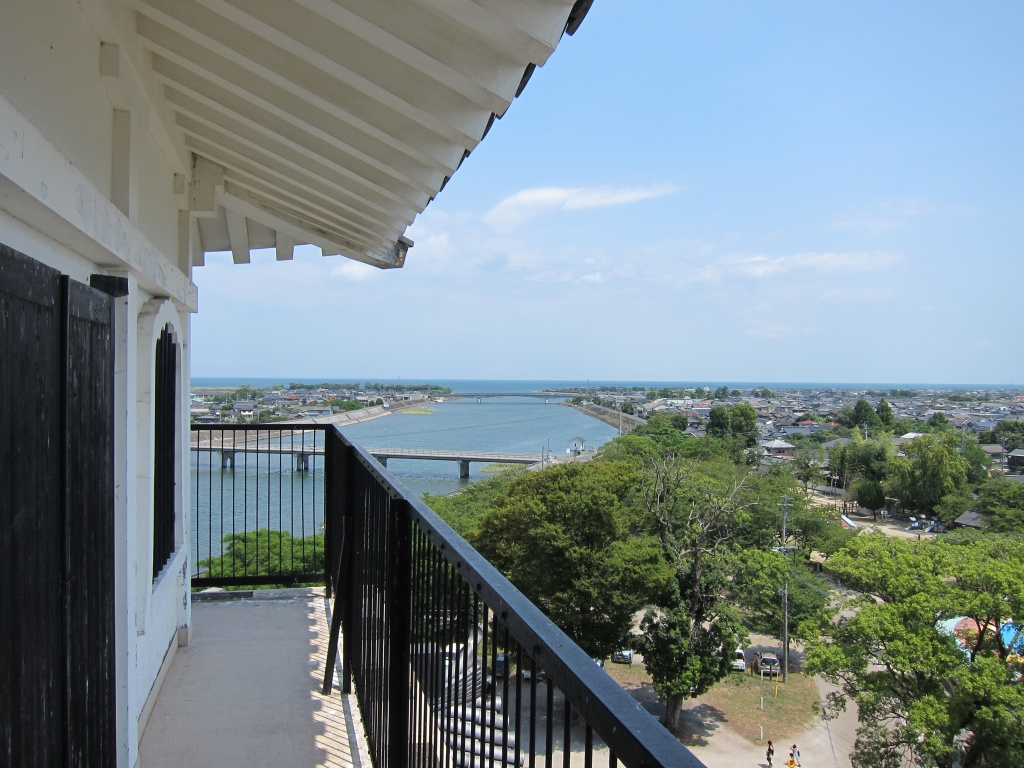
The view of the city from the deck

According to local folklore, Yoshitaka faced rebellions from the people of his region, who attacked his castle. The rebels were slain, but their bloodstains showed through the walls even after painting them over, prompting the governor to have the walls painted red. The original castle housed a small shrine for the rebel leader Utsonomiya Shigefusa.

== Today ==
The castle is presently used as a museum displaying heirlooms of families that governed the region. The museum has many materials on rangaku, as the city of Nakatsu was a center of rangaku learning. Furthermore, the castle houses the Okudaira shrine, which is an important shrine for the people of the city.

The castle was put up for sale in 2007 by the owners. After negotiations with the Nakatsu City Council fell through, the building was sold in 2010 to a Saitama-based company called Chiga.

The Castle was listed as one of the Continued Top 100 Japanese Castles in 2017.
