= Sankō, Ōita =

Dissolved municipality in Ōita prefecture, Japan

Sankō (三光村, Sankō-mura) was a town located in Shimoge District, Ōita Prefecture, Japan.

== Population ==
In 2003, the village had an estimated population of 5,574 and the density of 121.12 persons per km^{2}. The total area was 46.02 km^{2}.

== History ==
On March 1, 2005, Sankō, along with the towns of Hon'yabakei, Yabakei and Yamakuni (all from Shimoge District), was merged into the expanded city of Nakatsu.
