= Shimoge District, Ōita =

Former district in Ōita prefecture, Japan

Shimoge (下毛郡, Shimoge-gun) was a district located in Ōita Prefecture, Japan.

== Population ==
As of 2003, the district had an estimated population of 17,827 with a density of 40.98 persons per km^{2}. The total area was 435.03 km^{2}.

== Towns and villages ==
- Hon'yabakei
- Sankō
- Yabakei
- Yamakuni

== Mergers ==
- On March 1, 2005 - the towns of Hon'yabakei, Yabakei and Yamakuni, and the village of Sankō were merged into the expanded city of Nakatsu. Shimoge District was dissolved as a result of this merger.
