= Hon'yabakei, Ōita =

Dissolved municipality in Ōita prefecture, Japan

Hon'yabakei (本耶馬渓町, Hon'yabakei-machi) was a town located in Shimoge District, Ōita Prefecture, Japan.

As of 2003, the town had an estimated population of 3,721 and the density of 43.54 persons per km^{2}. The total area was 85.46 km^{2}.

On March 1, 2005, Hon'yabakei, along with the towns of Yabakei and Yamakuni, and the village of Sankō (all from Shimoge District), was merged into the expanded city of Nakatsu.
