= List of national parks of Japan =

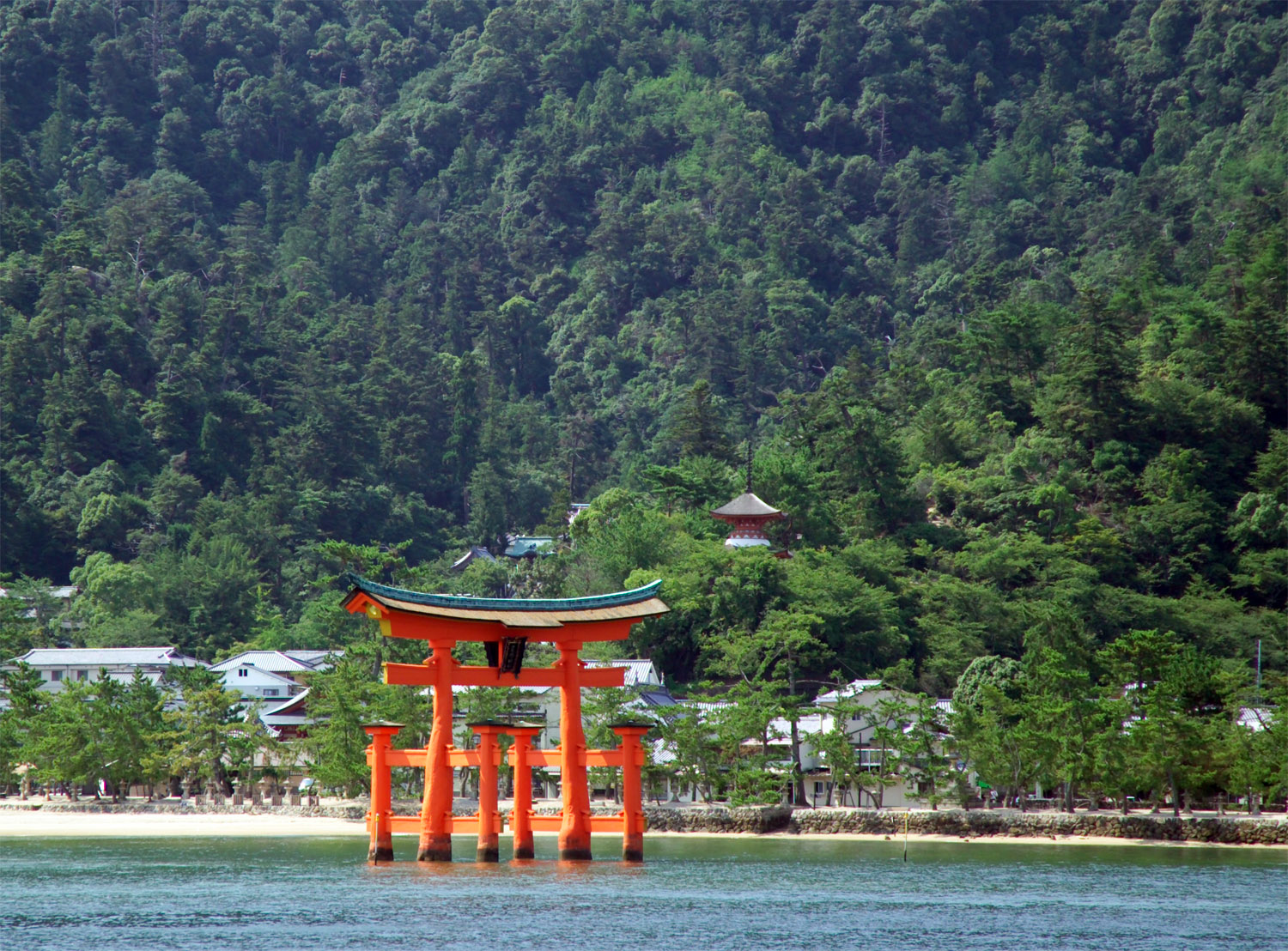
Itsukushima in Setonaikai National Park, the first of Japan's national parks (established 1934)

National parks (国立公園, Kokuritsu Kōen) and quasi-national parks (国定公園, Kokutei Kōen) of Japan are places of scenic beauty that are designated for protection and sustainable use by the Minister of the Environment under the Natural Parks Law (自然公園法) of 1957. National parks are designated and in principle managed by the Ministry of the Environment. Quasi-national parks, of a slightly lesser beauty, size, diversity, or state of preservation, are recommended for ministerial designation and managed by the prefectures under the supervision of the ministry.

== History ==
Japan established its first kōen (公園) or public parks in 1873 (Asakusa Park, Asukayama Park, Fukagawa Park, Shiba Park, and Ueno Park). In 1911 local citizens petitioned that the shrines and forests of Nikkō be placed under public protection. In 1929 the National Parks Association was formed. In 1931 the first National Parks Law (国立公園法) was passed. After much study and survey, in March 1934 the first parks were established—Setonaikai, Unzen and Kirishima—with six more in December and a further five two years later. Three further parks were established under the old National Parks Law, in colonial Taiwan in 1937: the Tatun National Park (the smallest in Japan); Tsugitaka-Taroko National Park, (the largest); and Niitaka-Arisan National Park (with the highest mountain in then Japan).

Ise-Shima was the first to be created after the war, and a further seven had been added by 1955.

In 1957 the Natural Parks Law replaced the earlier National Parks Law, allowing for three categories: the national, quasi-national, and prefectural natural parks. With minor amendments this established the framework that operates today.

As of 1 April 2014, there were 31 national parks and 56 quasi-national parks, with the national parks covering 20,996 km^{2} (5.6% of the land area) and the quasi-national parks 13,592 km^{2} (3.6% of the land area). In addition, there were 314 prefectural parks covering 19,726 km^{2} (5.2% of the land area). On 27 March 2015, the 32nd national park was established, Myōkō-Togakushi Renzan National Park, on 15 September 2016, the 33rd, Yanbaru National Park, and on 7 March 2017, the 34th, Amami Guntō National Park, subsuming Amami Guntō Quasi-National Park. On 25 March 2016, a further quasi-national park was established, Kyoto Tamba Kogen Quasi-National Park, on 27 March 2020, Chūō Alps Quasi-National Park, and, on 30 March 2021, Akkeshi-Kiritappu-Konbumori Quasi-National Park. On 25 June 2024, Hidaka-sanmyaku Erimo Quasi-National Park was redesignated Hidakasanmyaku-Erimo-Tokachi National Park, making it the 35th national park, and on 10 April 2026, Ontakesan Quasi-National Park was established, the 58th quasi-national park.

== Protection status ==
The area of each national and quasi-national park is divided into ordinary, special and marine park zones. Special zones are further subdivided into special protection and class I, II, and III special zones, restricting access and use for preservation purposes. The state owns only approximately half of the land in the parks.

== Map of national parks ==
This map shows the locations of the national parks in Japan. Note Ogasawara National Park is not visible on the map.

Map with national parks of Japan. Note Ogasawara National Park is not on the map.

== List of national parks ==
| Name | Established | Region | Area [ha] | Photo |
|---|---|---|---|---|
| Akan Mashu National Park | 1934 | Hokkaidō | 90,481 hectares (223,580 acres) | |
| Minami Alps National Park | 1964 | Chūbu | 35,752 hectares (88,350 acres) | |
| Amami Guntō National Park | 2017 | Kyūshū | 42,181 hectares (104,230 acres) | |
| Ashizuri-Uwakai National Park | 1972 | Shikoku | 11,345 hectares (28,030 acres) | |
| Aso Kujū National Park | 1934 | Kyūshū | 72,678 hectares (179,590 acres) | |
| Bandai-Asahi National Park | 1950 | Tōhoku | 186,389 hectares (460,580 acres) | |
| Chichibu Tama Kai National Park | 1950 | Kantō | 126,259 hectares (311,990 acres) | |
| Chūbu-Sangaku National Park | 1934 | Chūbu | 174,323 hectares (430,760 acres) | |
| Daisen-Oki National Park | 1936 | Chūgoku | 35,353 hectares (87,360 acres) | |
| Daisetsuzan National Park | 1934 | Hokkaidō | 226,764 hectares (560,350 acres) | |
| Fuji-Hakone-Izu National Park | 1936 | Kantō | 121,695 hectares (300,710 acres) | |
| Hakusan National Park | 1962 | Chūbu | 11,345 hectares (28,030 acres) | |
| Hidakasanmyaku-Erimo-Tokachi National Park | 2024 | Hokkaido | 245,668 hectares (607,060 acres) | |
| Iriomote-Ishigaki National Park | 1972 | Kyūshū | 40,653 hectares (100,460 acres) | |
| Ise-Shima National Park | 1946 | Kinki | 55,544 hectares (137,250 acres) | |
| Jōshin'etsu-kōgen National Park | 1949 | Kantō | 148,194 hectares (366,200 acres) | |
| Kerama Shotō National Park | 2014 | Kyūshū | 3,520 hectares (8,700 acres) | |
| Kirishima-Kinkowan National Park | 1934 | Kyūshū | 36,586 hectares (90,410 acres) | |
| Kushiro-shitsugen National Park | 1987 | Hokkaidō | 28,788 hectares (71,140 acres) | |
| Myōkō-Togakushi Renzan National Park | 2015 | Chūbu | 39,772 hectares (98,280 acres) | |
| Nikkō National Park | 1934 | Kantō | 114,908 hectares (283,940 acres) | |
| Ogasawara National Park | 1972 | Kantō | 6,629 hectares (16,380 acres) | |
| Oze National Park | 1972 | Tōhoku and Kantō | 37,200 hectares (92,000 acres) | |
| Rishiri-Rebun-Sarobetsu National Park | 1974 | Hokkaidō | 24,166 hectares (59,720 acres) | |
| Saikai National Park | 1955 | Kyūshū | 24,646 hectares (60,900 acres) | |
| Sanin Kaigan National Park | 1936 | Kinki | 8,783 hectares (21,700 acres) | |
| Sanriku Fukkō National Park | 1955 | Tōhoku | 28,537 hectares (70,520 acres) | |
| Setonaikai National Park | 1934 | Kinki, Chūgoku, Shikoku, Kyushu (Joint management) | 67,242 hectares (166,160 acres) | |
| Shikotsu-Tōya National Park | 1949 | Hokkaidō | 99,473 hectares (245,800 acres) | |
| Shiretoko National Park | 1964 | Hokkaidō | 38,636 hectares (95,470 acres) | |
| Towada-Hachimantai National Park | 1936 | Tōhoku | 85,534 hectares (211,360 acres) | |
| Unzen-Amakusa National Park | 1934 | Kyūshū | 28,279 hectares (69,880 acres) | |
| Yakushima National Park | 2012 | Kyūshū | 32,553 hectares (80,440 acres) | |
| Yanbaru National Park | 2016 | Kyūshū | 13,622 hectares (33,660 acres) | |
| Yoshino-Kumano National Park | 1936 | Kinki | 61,406 hectares (151,740 acres) | |

== List of quasi-national parks ==
=== Hokkaidō ===
- Abashiri Quasi-National Park
- Akkeshi-Kiritappu-Konbumori Quasi-National Park
- Niseko-Shakotan-Otaru Kaigan Quasi-National Park
- Ōnuma Quasi-National Park
- Shokanbetsu-Teuri-Yagishiri Quasi-National Park

=== Tōhoku ===
- Shimokita Hantō Quasi-National Park
- Tsugaru Quasi-National Park
- Hayachine Quasi-National Park
- Kurikoma Quasi-National Park
- Minami-Sanriku Kinkazan Quasi-National Park
- Zaō Quasi-National Park
- Oga Quasi-National Park
- Chōkai Quasi-National Park

=== Kantō ===
- Suigō-Tsukuba Quasi-National Park
- Minami Bōsō Quasi-National Park
- Meiji no Mori Takao Quasi-National Park
- Tanzawa-Ōyama Quasi-National Park

=== Chūbu ===
- Echigo Sanzan-Tadami Quasi-National Park
- Myōgi-Arafune-Saku Kōgen Quasi-National Park
- Sado-Yahiko-Yoneyama Quasi-National Park
- Noto Hantō Quasi-National Park
- Echizen-Kaga Kaigan Quasi-National Park
- Yatsugatake-Chūshin Kōgen Quasi-National Park
- Tenryū-Okumikawa Quasi-National Park
- Chūō Alps Quasi-National Park
- Ontakesan Quasi-National Park
- Ibi-Sekigahara-Yōrō Quasi-National Park
- Hida-Kisogawa Quasi-National Park
- Aichi Kōgen Quasi-National Park
- Mikawa Wan Quasi-National Park

=== Kansai ===
- Suzuka Quasi-National Park
- Wakasa Wan Quasi-National Park
- Tango-Amanohashidate-Ōeyama Quasi-National Park
- Biwako Quasi-National Park
- Murō-Akame-Aoyama Quasi-National Park
- Kongō-Ikoma-Kisen Quasi-National Park
- Yamato-Aogaki Quasi-National Park
- Kōya-Ryūjin Quasi-National Park
- Meiji no Mori Minō Quasi-National Park
- Kyoto Tamba Kogen Quasi-National Park

=== Chūgoku and Shikoku ===
- Hyōnosen-Ushiroyama-Nagisan Quasi-National Park
- Hiba-Dōgo-Taishaku Quasi-National Park
- Nishi-Chūgoku Sanchi Quasi-National Park
- Kita Nagato Kaigan Quasi-National Park
- Akiyoshidai Quasi-National Park
- Tsurugisan Quasi-National Park
- Muroto-Anan Kaigan Quasi-National Park
- Ishizuchi Quasi-National Park

=== Kyūshū ===
- Kitakyūshū Quasi-National Park
- Genkai Quasi-National Park
- Yaba-Hita-Hikosan Quasi-National Park
- Iki-Tsushima Quasi-National Park
- Kyūshū Chūō Sanchi Quasi-National Park
- Nippō Kaigan Quasi-National Park
- Sobo Katamuki Quasi-National Park
- Nichinan Kaigan Quasi-National Park
- Okinawa Kaigan Quasi-National Park
- Okinawa Senseki Quasi-National Park

== See also ==
- Special places of scenic beauty
- List of Ramsar sites in Japan
- Geography of Japan
