= Sado-Yahiko-Yoneyama Quasi-National Park =

Japanese park

- 佐渡弥彦米山国定公園
- IUCN category V (protected landscape/seascape)
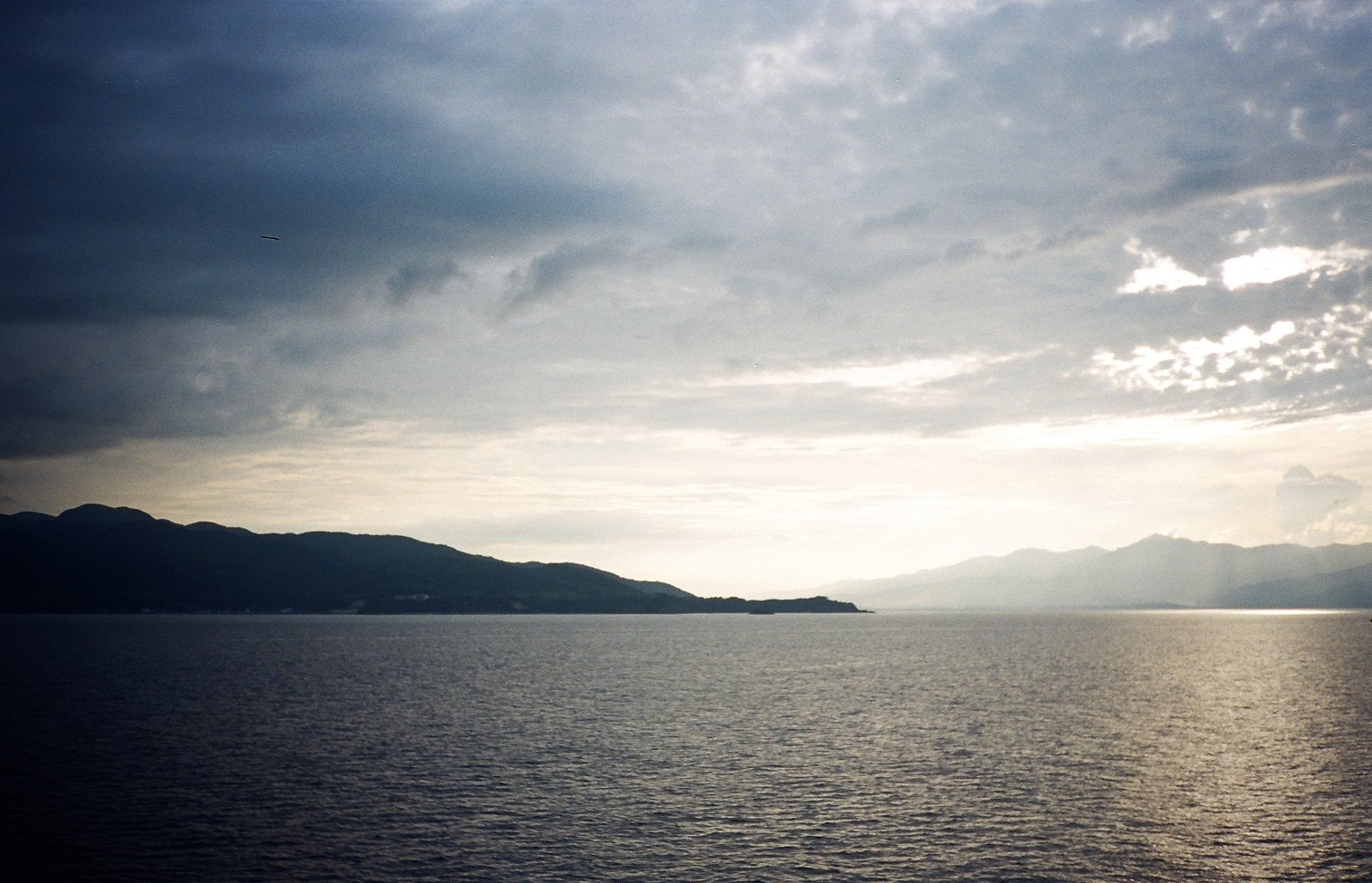
- Sado island

- Location within Japan
- Location: Honshū, Japan
- Coordinates: 38°15′39″N 138°27′30″E
- Area: 294.64 sq.km
- Established: July 27, 1950
- Governing body: Niigata, prefectural governments

Sado-Yahiko-Yoneyama Quasi-National Park (佐渡弥彦米山国定公園, Sado-Yahiko-Yoneyama Kokutei Kōen) is a Quasi-National Park in Niigata Prefecture, Japan. Designated on 27 July 1950, it has an area of 29,364 ha. It is rated a protected landscape (category V) according to the IUCN.

Like all Quasi-National Parks in Japan, the park is managed by the local prefectural governments.

== See also ==
- List of national parks of Japan
- Yahiko Shrine, Shinto shrine located near the Sado-Yahiko-Yoneyama Quasi-National Park
