= Ogasawara National Park =

National park of Japan

- 小笠原国立公園
- IUCN category II (national park)
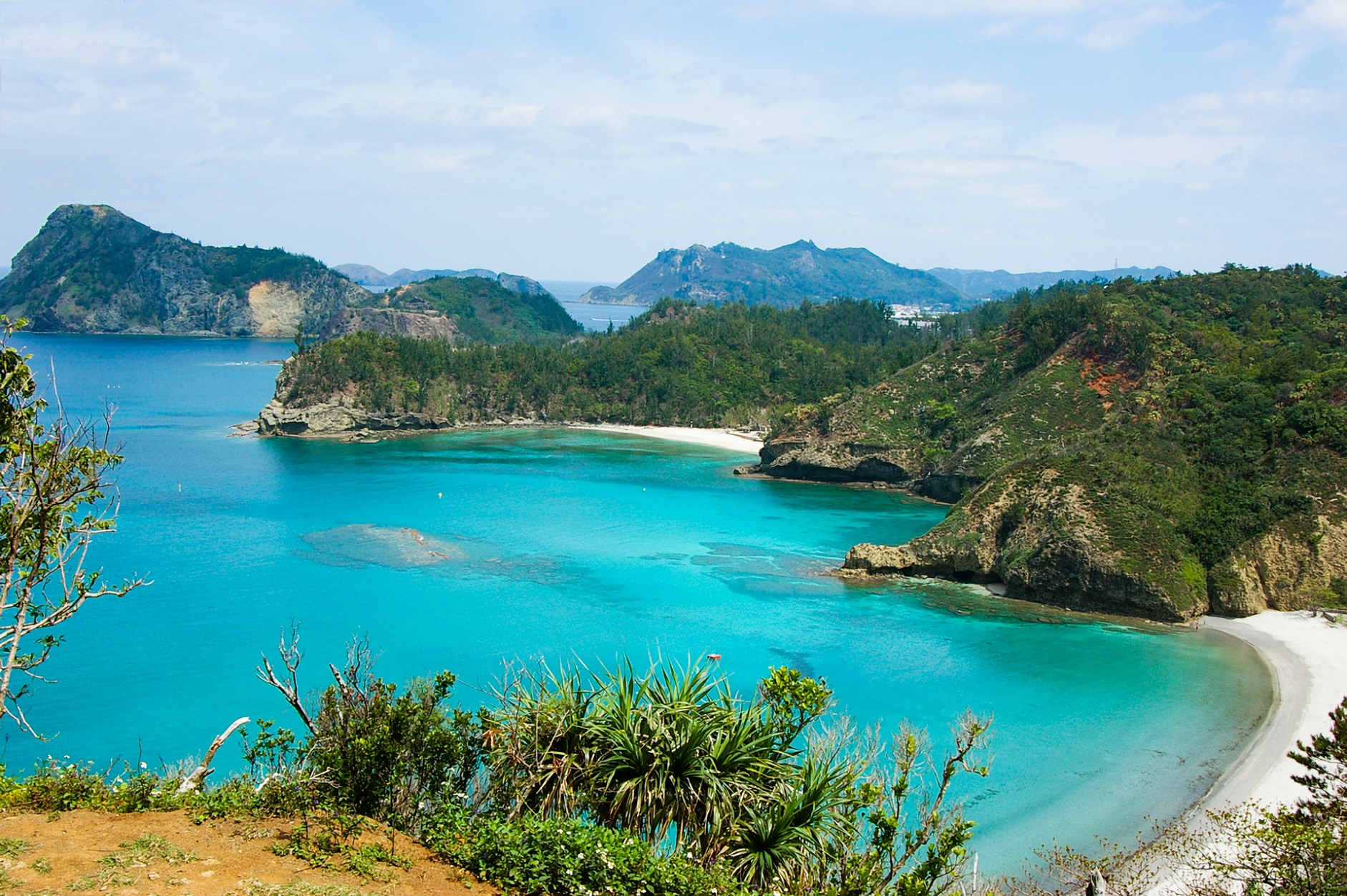
- Chichijima

- Location within Oceania
- Location: Bonin Islands, Japan
- Coordinates: 26.8667°N 142.183°E
- Area: 66.29 km^{2} (25.59 sq mi)
- Established: 16 October 1972
- Governing body: Ministry of the Environment (Japan)

Ogasawara National Park (小笠原国立公園, Ogasawara Kokuritsu Kōen) is a national park in the Ogasawara Islands, located approximately one thousand kilometres to the south of Tokyo, Japan. The park was established in 1972 within the municipality of Ogasawara, itself part of Tokyo. In 2011, the Ogasawara Islands were inscribed upon the UNESCO World Heritage List.

== Islands ==
The archipelago is also known as the Bonin Islands, a corruption of munin (無人), meaning 'uninhabited'. The islands were returned to Japanese administration in 1968 after US Occupation. The Chichijima, Hahajima, and Mukojima clusters are included within the park, but of the three Volcano Islands, Iwo Jima and Minami Iwo Jima are not.

== Flora and fauna ==
According to the IUCN evaluation for UNESCO, 441 taxa of native plants have been recorded, of which 161 of vascular plants and 88 of woody plants are endemic; the only native mammal is the critically endangered Bonin flying fox; of the 195 recorded species of birds, fourteen are on the IUCN Red List; of the two terrestrial reptiles, the Ogasawara snake-eyed skink (Cryptoblepharus nigropunctatus) is endemic; of 1,380 insect species, 379 are endemic; of 134 species of lands snails, 100 are endemic. 40 species of freshwater fish, 23 of cetaceans, 795 of saltwater fish, and 226 of hermatypic coral have been recorded.

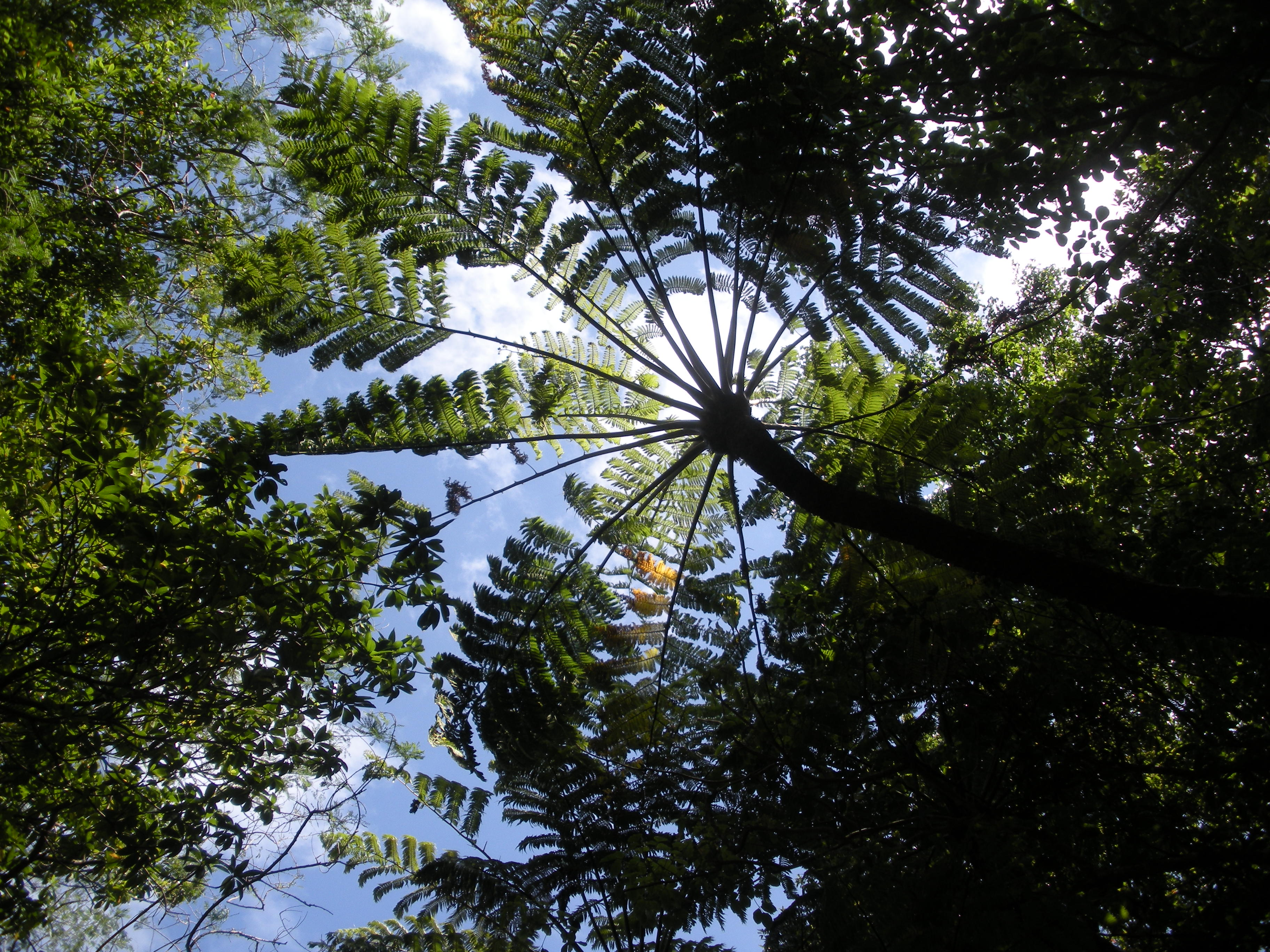
Cyathea medullaris in Ogasawara National Park

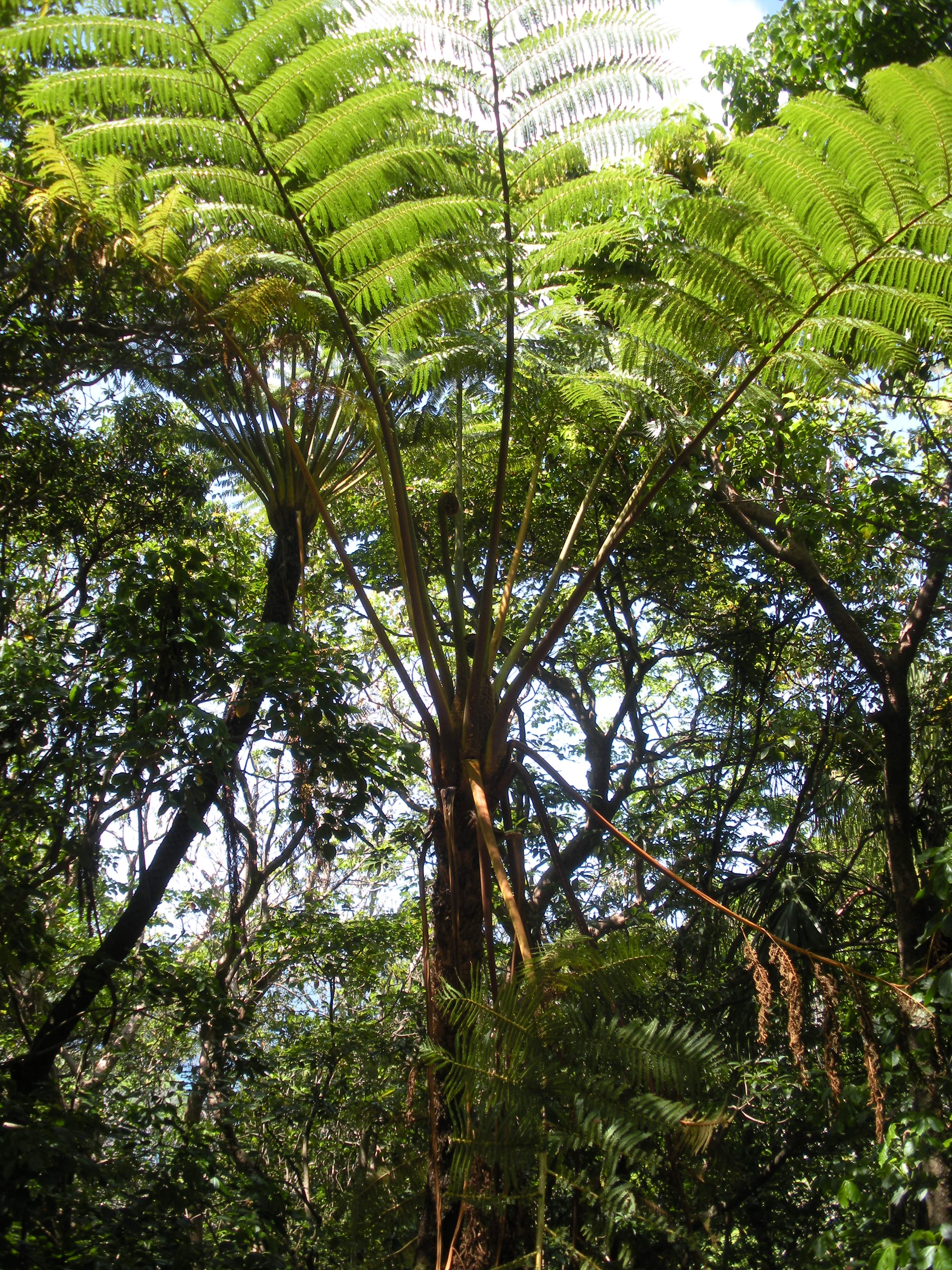
Cyathea spinulosa in Ogasawara National Park

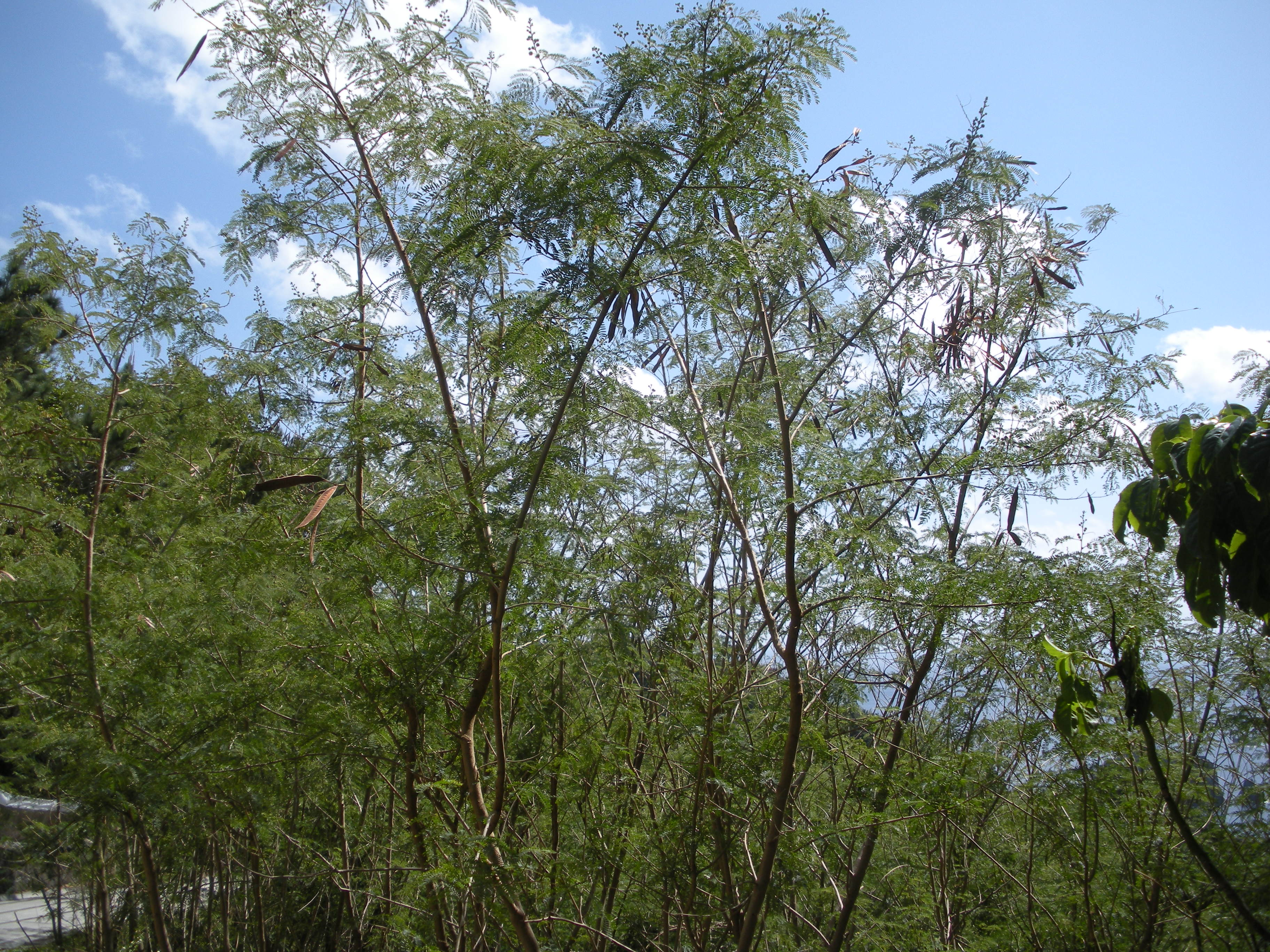
Leucaena leucocephala

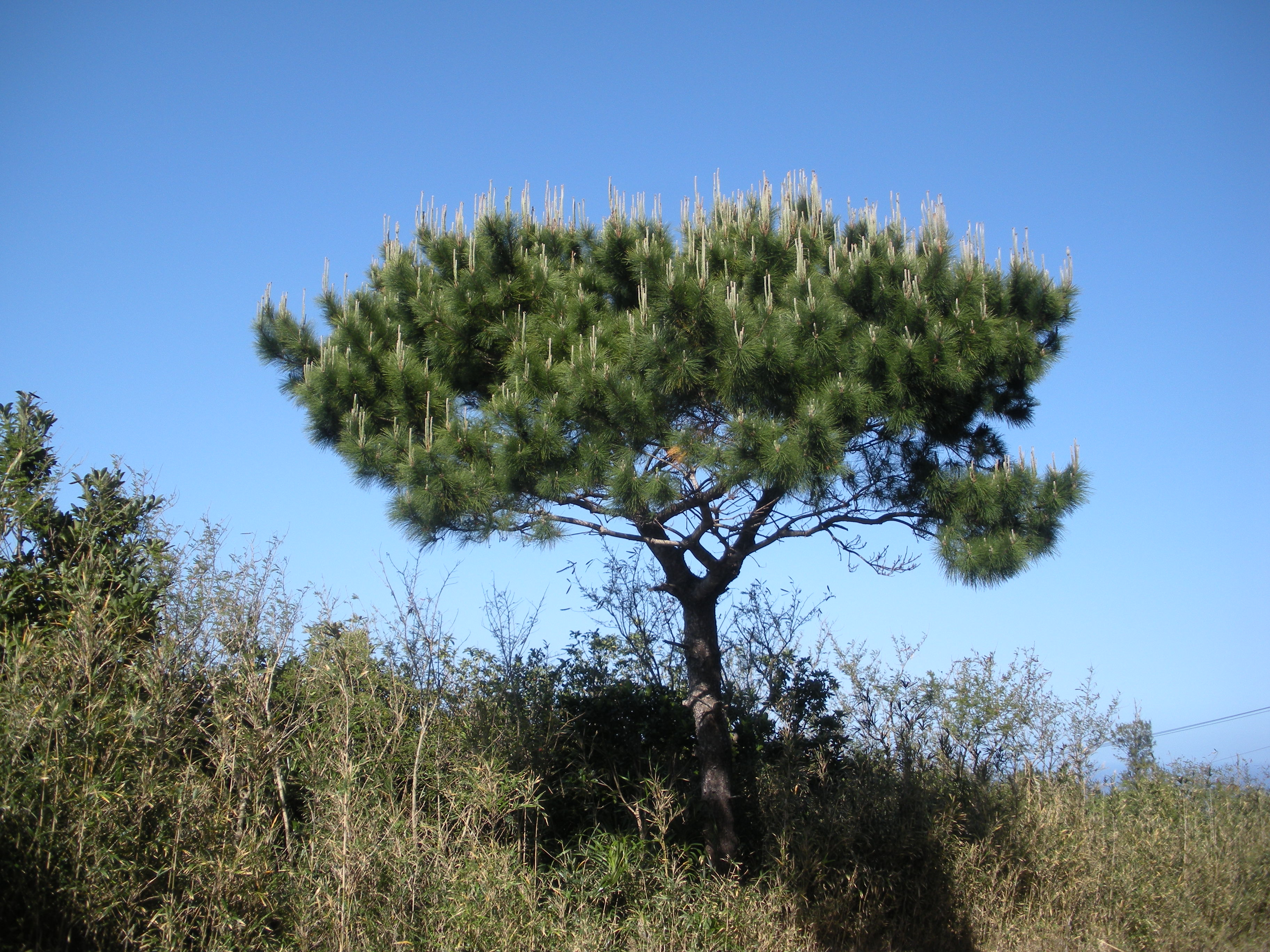
Pinus luchuensis

== See also ==
- National Parks of Japan
- World Heritage Sites in Japan
