= Kitakyūshū Quasi-National Park =

Quasi-national park in Fukuoka prefecture, Japan

- 北九州国定公園
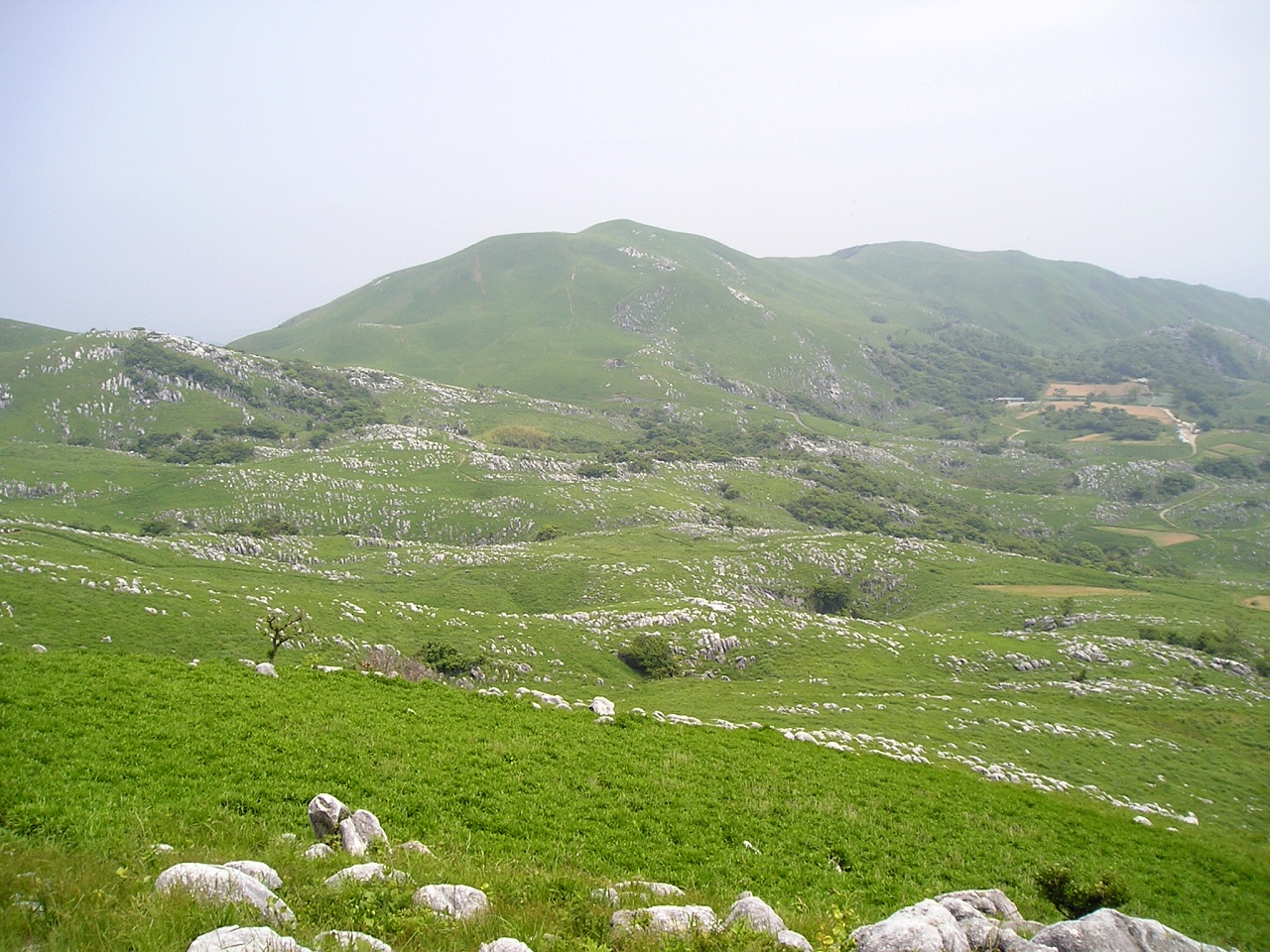
- Hiraodai karst plateau

- Location within Japan
- Location: Fukuoka Prefecture, Japan
- Nearest city: Nogata
- Coordinates: 33°43′12″N 130°46′01″E
- Area: 82.49 km^{2} (31.85 sq mi)
- Established: October 16, 1972

Kitakyūshū Quasi-National Park (北九州国定公園, Kitakyūshū Kokutei Kōen) is a Quasi-National Park in Fukuoka Prefecture, Japan. It was founded on 16 October 1972 and has an area of 82.49 km^{2} (31.85 sq mi).

== See also ==
- List of national parks of Japan
