= Ontakesan Quasi-National Park =

Park in Chūbu, Japan

- 御嶽山国定公園
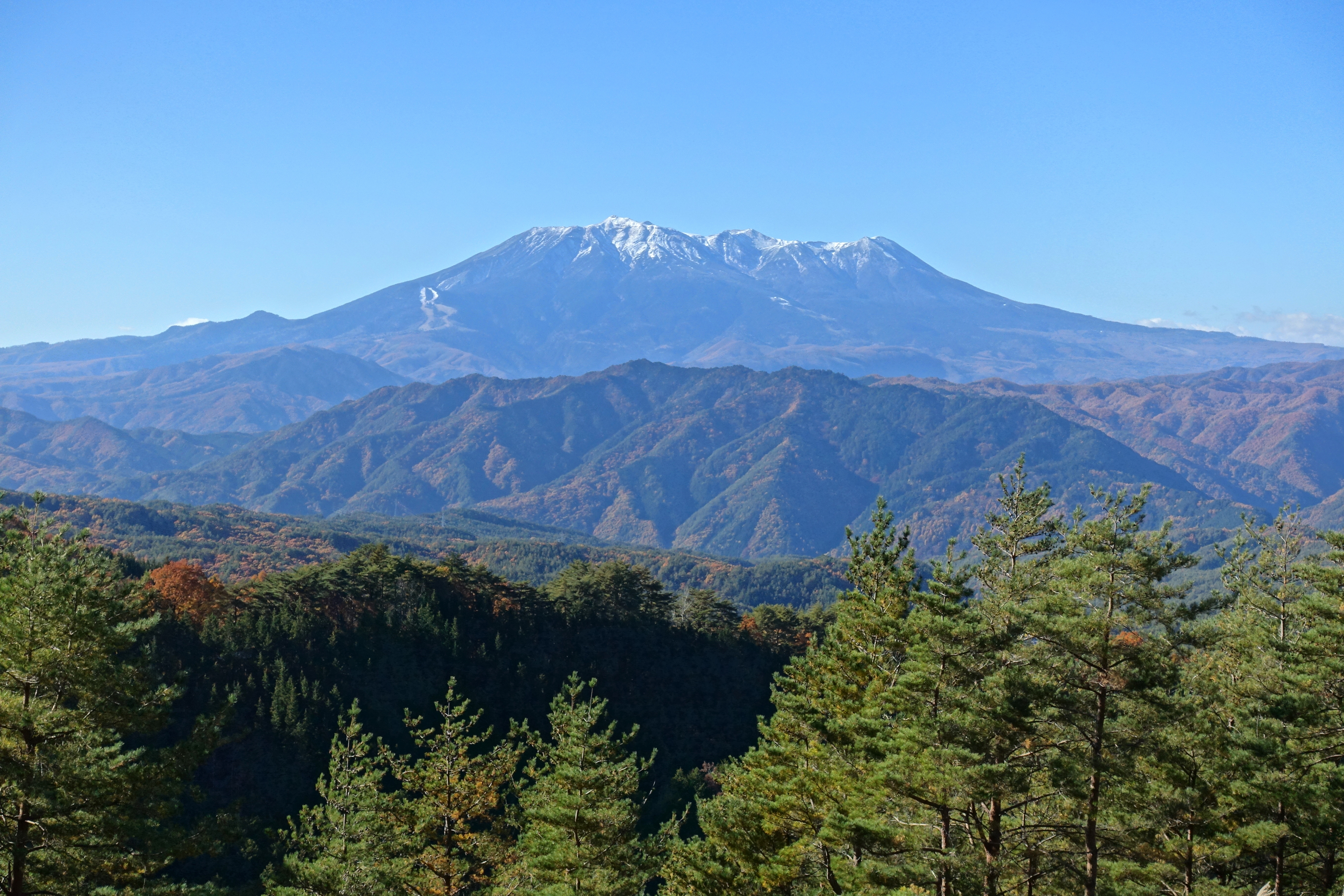
- Mount Ontake

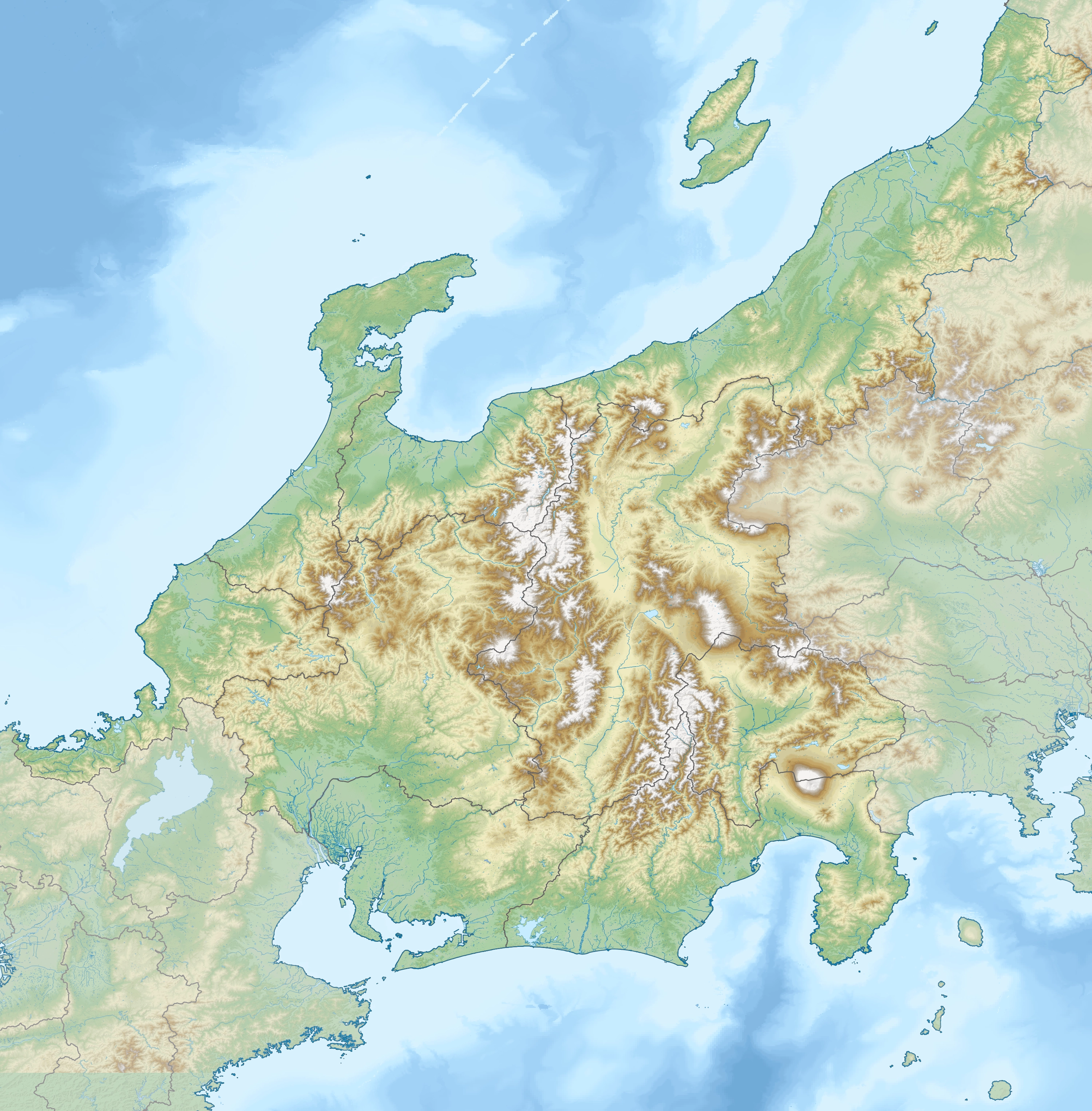
- Location within Chubu region Location within Japan
- Interactive map of Ontakesan Quasi-National Park
- Location: Chūbu region, Japan
- Coordinates: 35°52′56″N 137°26′55″E
- Area: 282.75 square kilometres (109.17 sq mi)
- Established: 10 April 2026

Ontakesan Quasi-National Park (御嶽山国定公園, Ontake-san kokutei kōen) is a quasi-national park in Nagano Prefecture and Gifu Prefecture, Japan. Established in 2026, the park's central feature is Mount Ontake. The park spans the borders of the municipalities of Kiso, Ōtaki, Gero, and Takayama. It supersedes and replaces the former Ontake Prefectural Natural Park (御岳県立自然公園), established in 1952.

== See also ==
- National Parks of Japan
