= Kyoto Tamba Kogen Quasi-National Park =

Quasi-national park of Japan

- 京都丹波高原国定公園
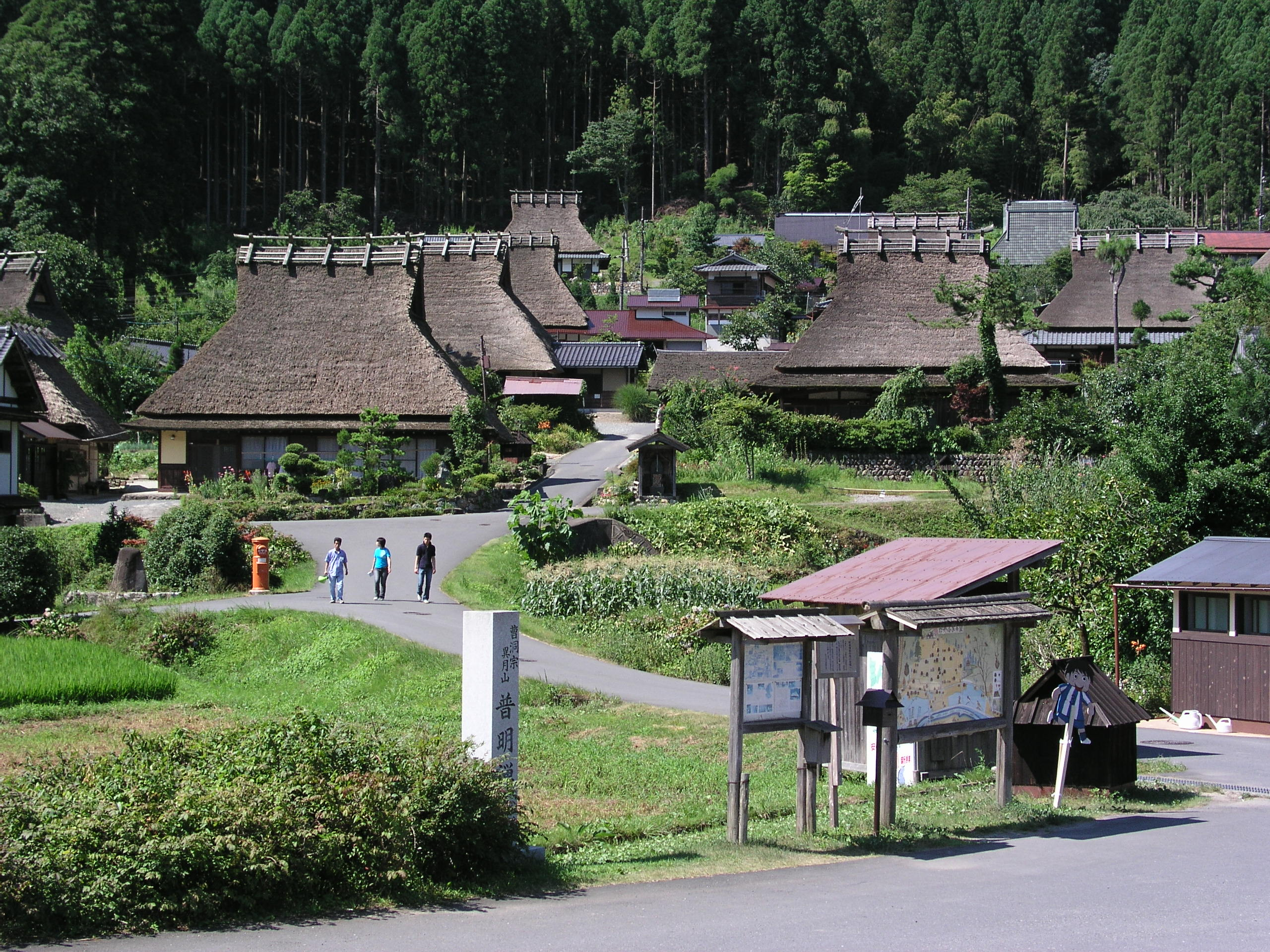
- Miyama Kayabuki no Sato

- Location within Japan
- Location: Kansai, Japan
- Nearest city: Nantan, Kyoto
- Coordinates: 35°18′50″N 135°37′20″E
- Area: 688.51 km^{2}
- Established: 25 March 2016
- Administrator: Kyoto Prefecture, Japan

Kyoto Tamba Kogen Quasi-National Park (京都丹波高原国定公園, Kyōto Tanba Kōgen Kokutei Kōen) is a Quasi-National Park in Kyoto Prefecture, Japan.

== Administration ==
Like all quasi-national parks in Japan, the park is managed by the local prefectural governments. Kyoto Tamba Kogen Quasi-National Park is administered by Kyoto Prefecture.

== Gallery ==
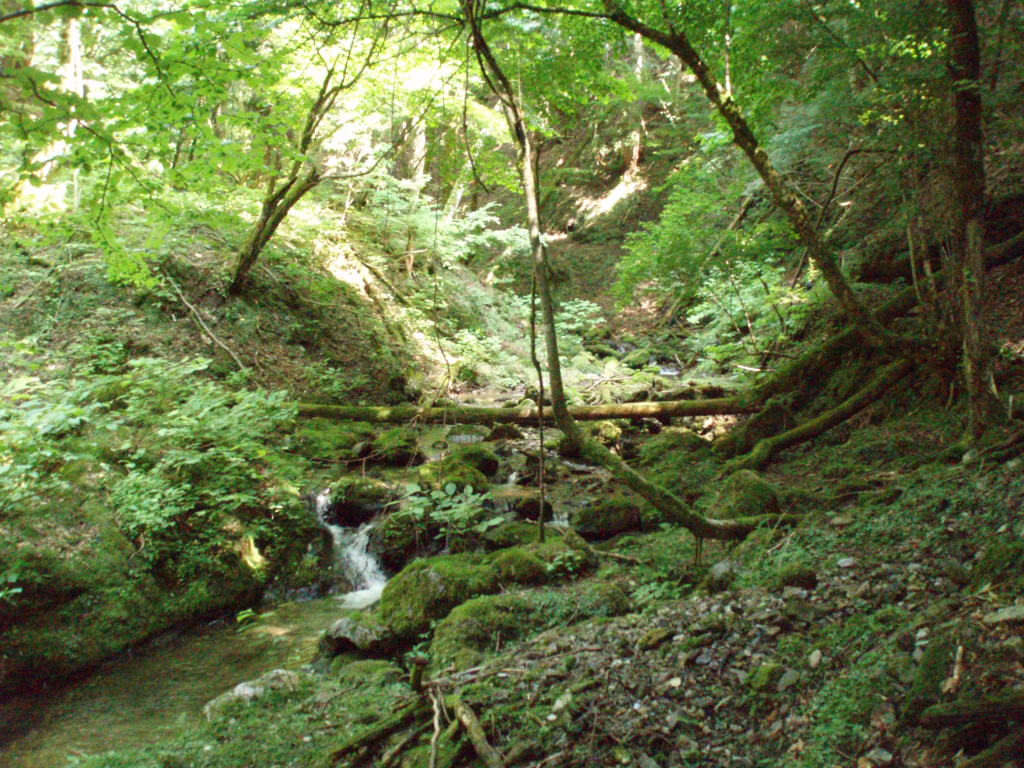
Akasaki-higashitani valley, tributary of Yura river (Asiu Forest, Field Science Education and Research Center, Kyoto University)

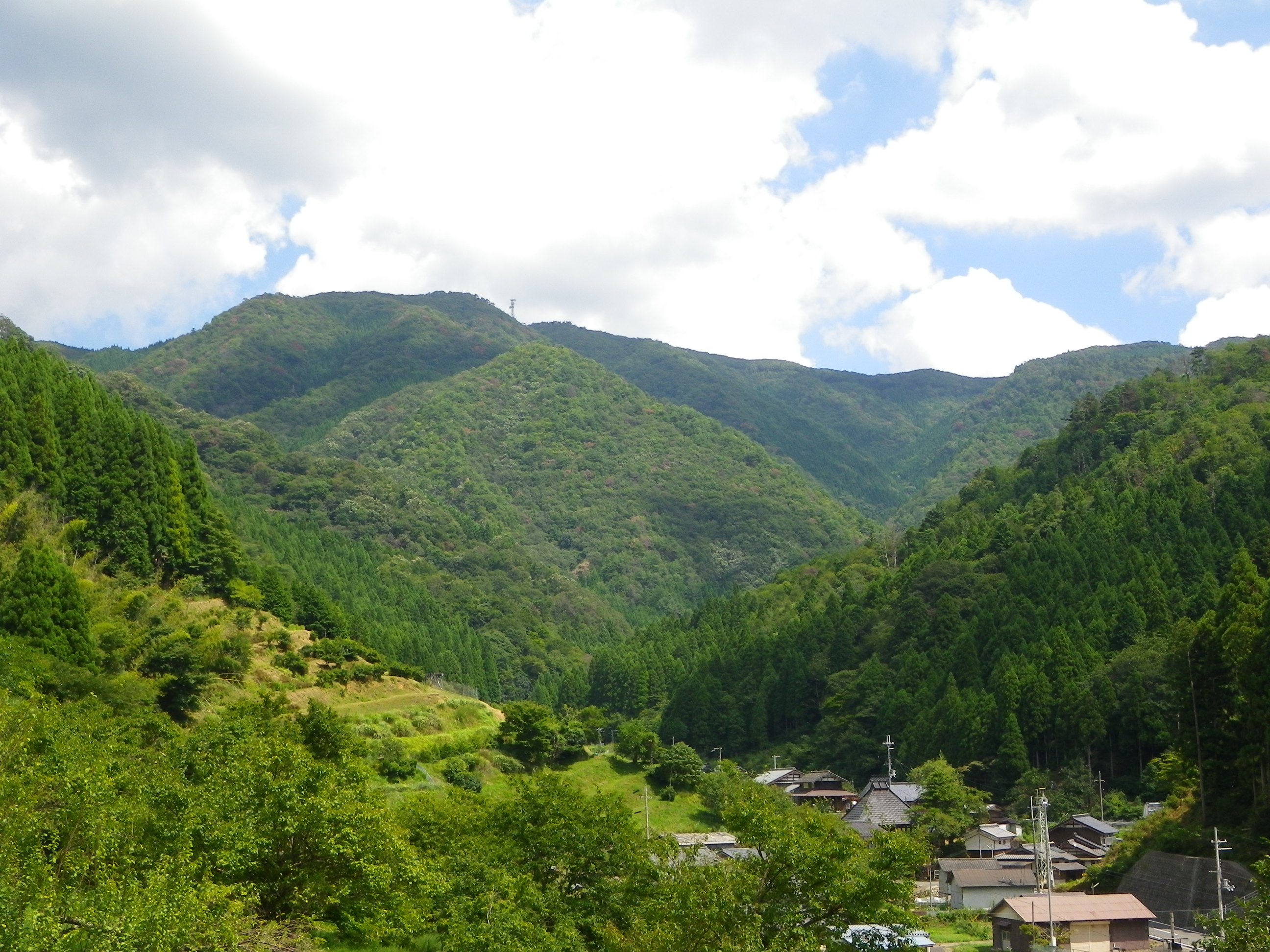
Mt. Choro-ga-take

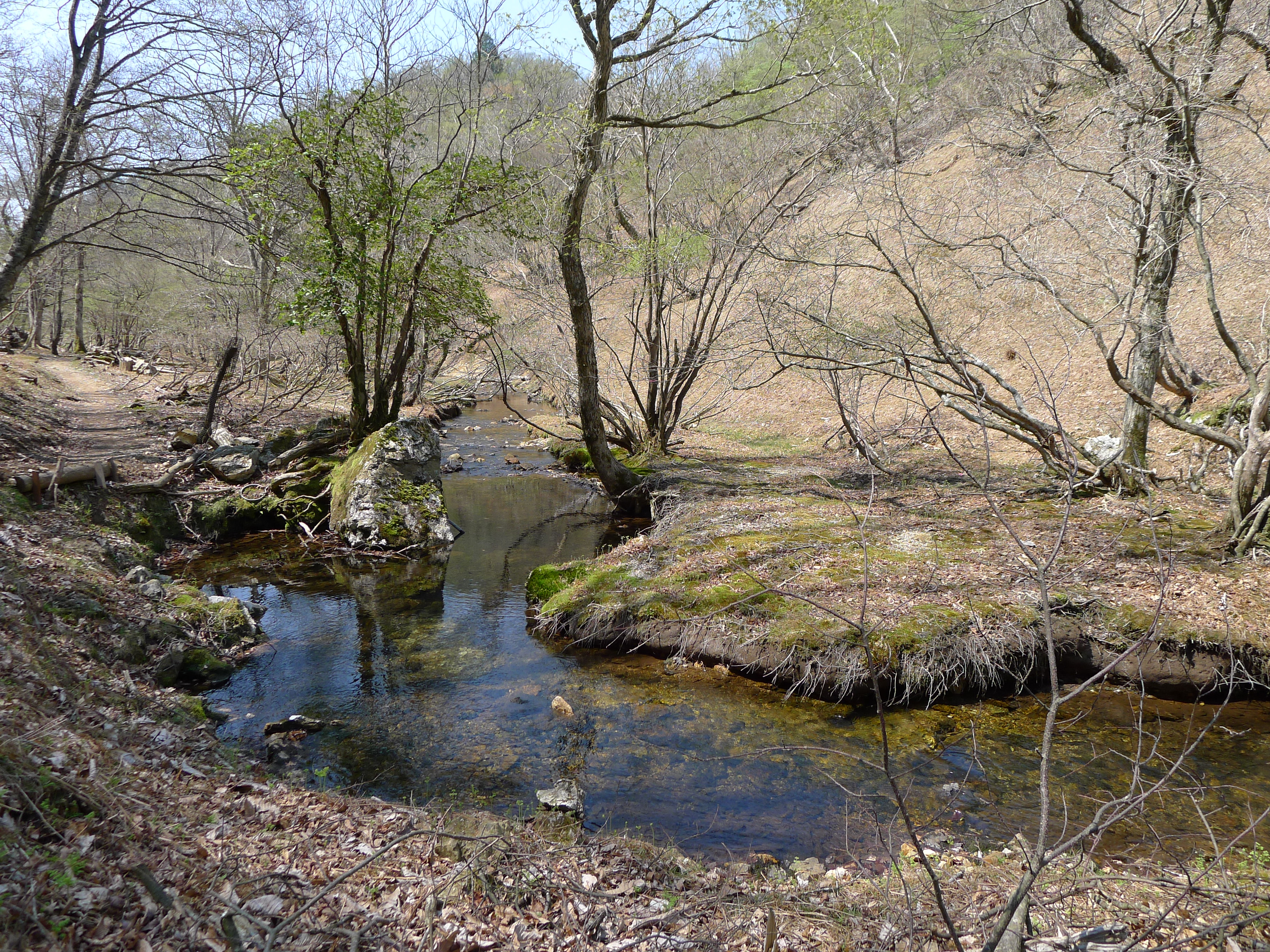
Haccho-Daira Wetland

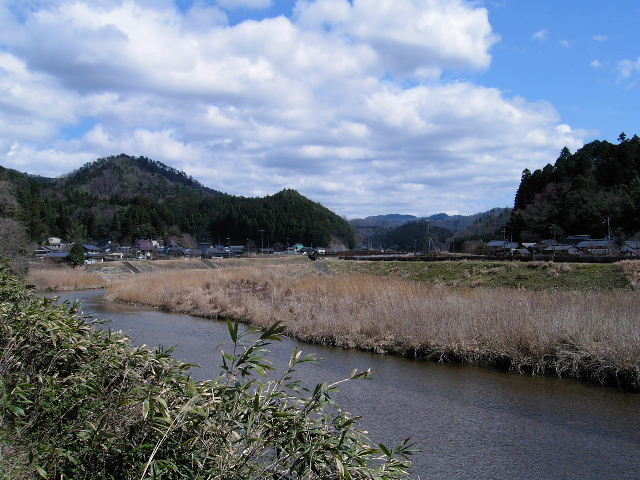
Oku-kambayashi, Koya, Ayabe, Kyoto

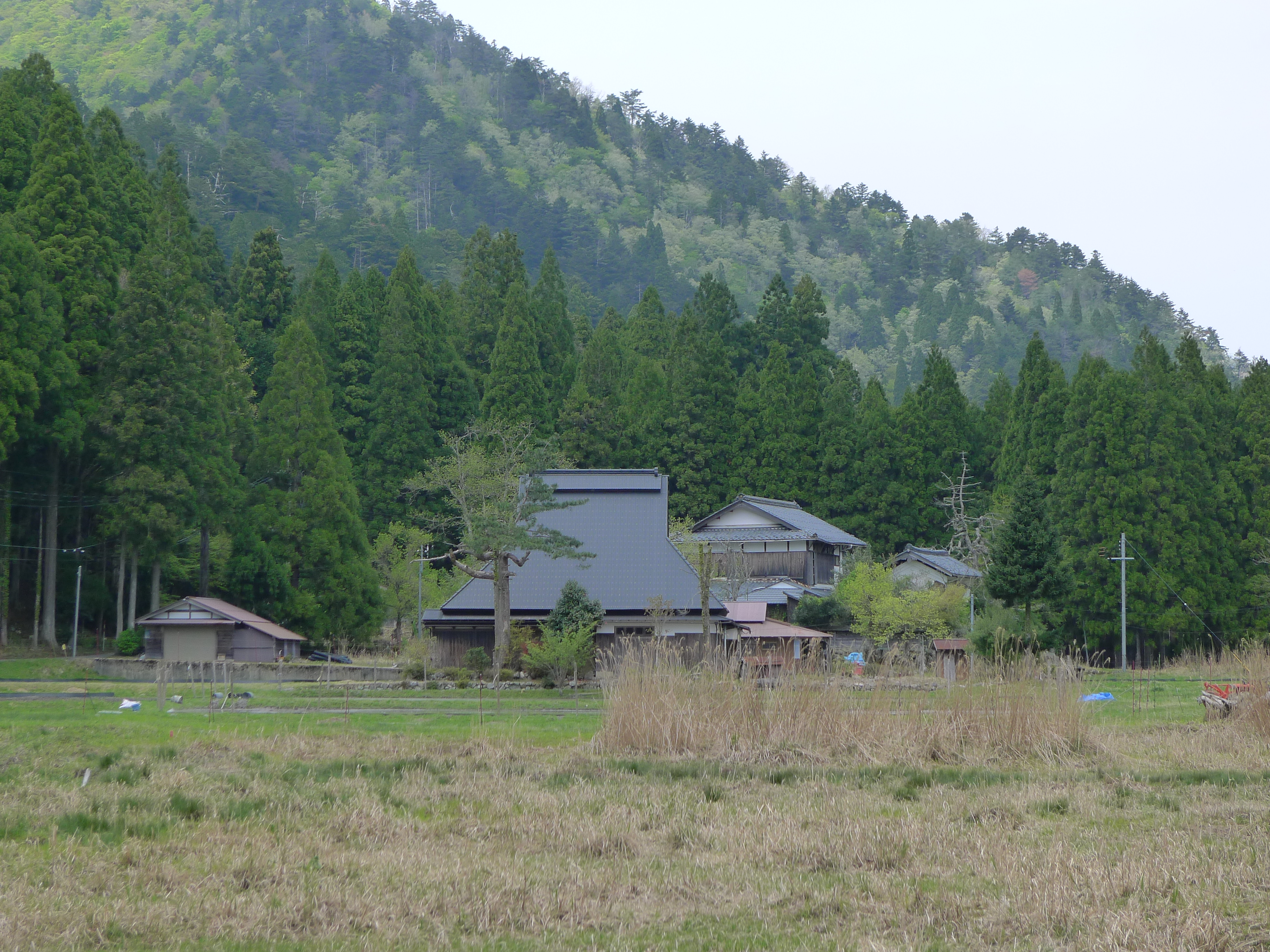
Kaminocho, Kuta, Kyoto

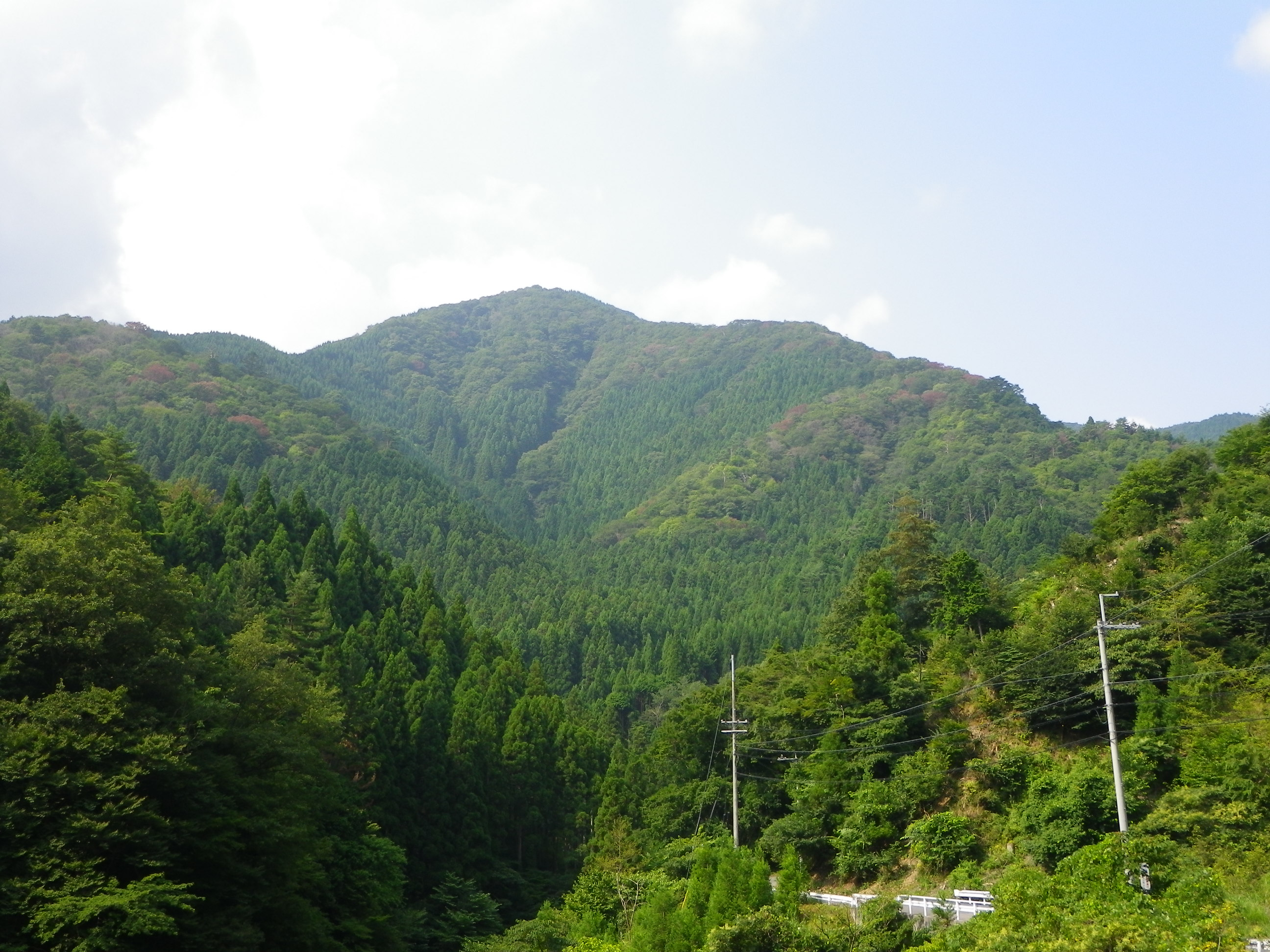
Mt. Minago

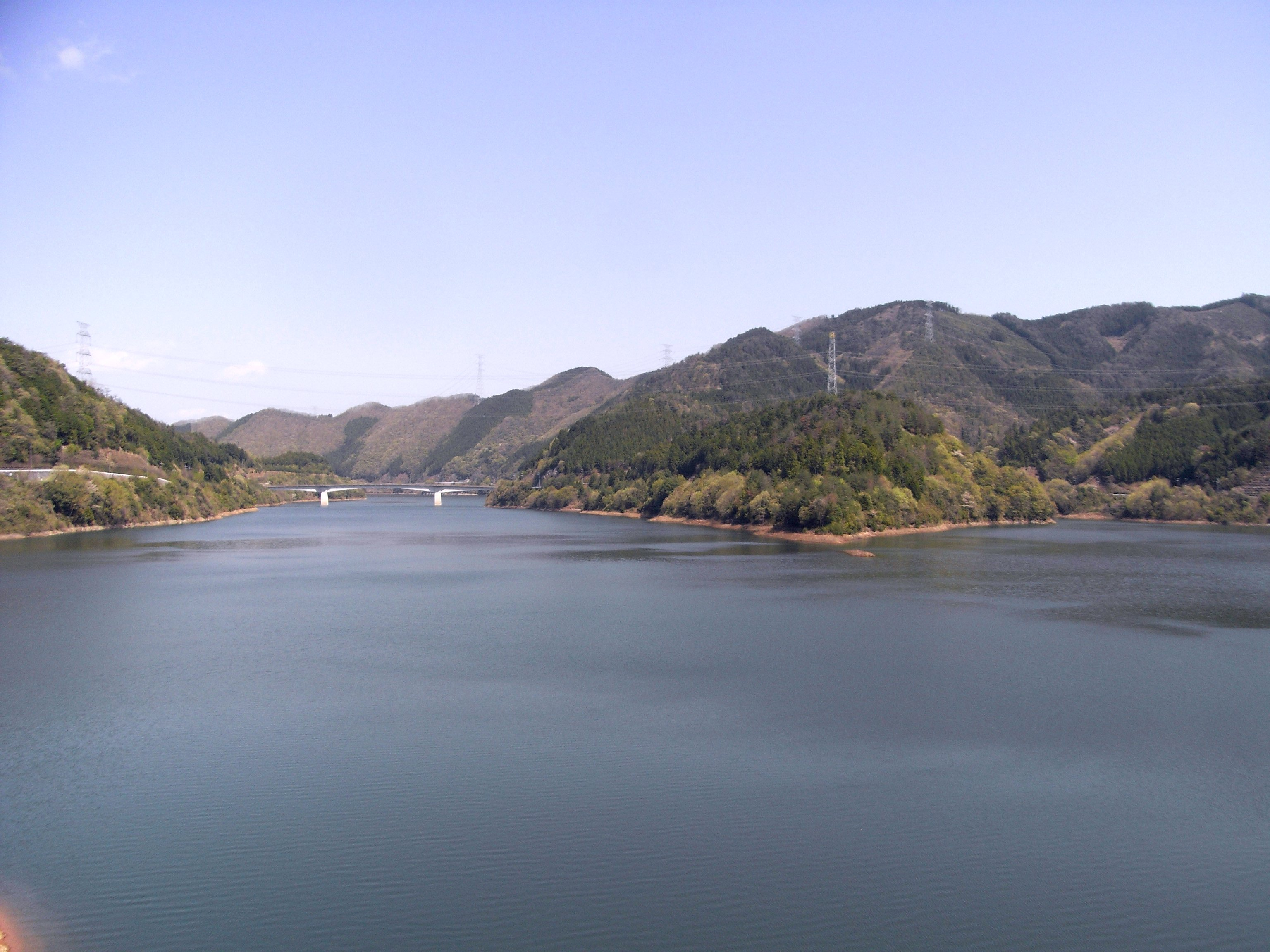
Amawaka Lake

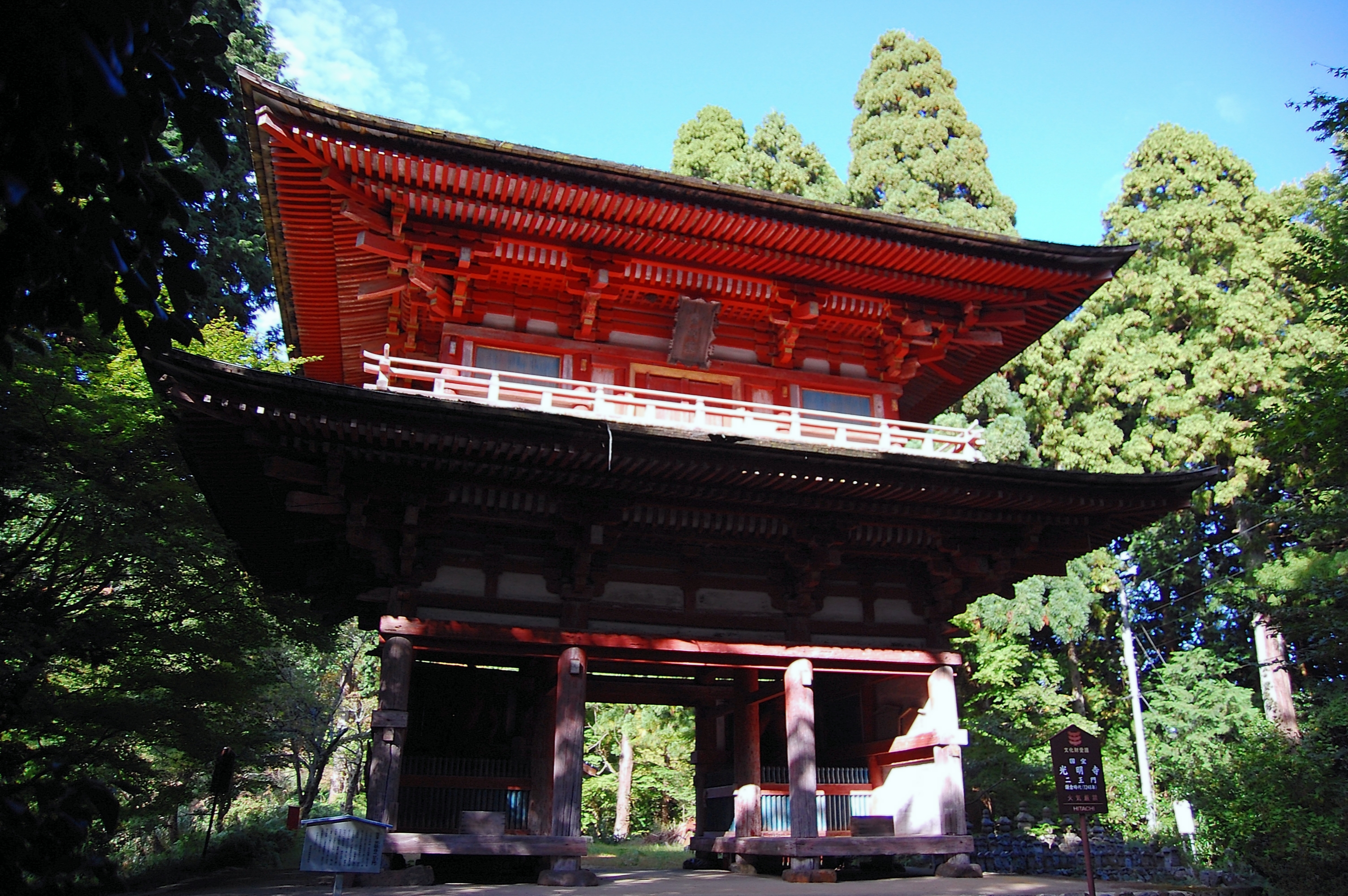
Komyo-ji Temple

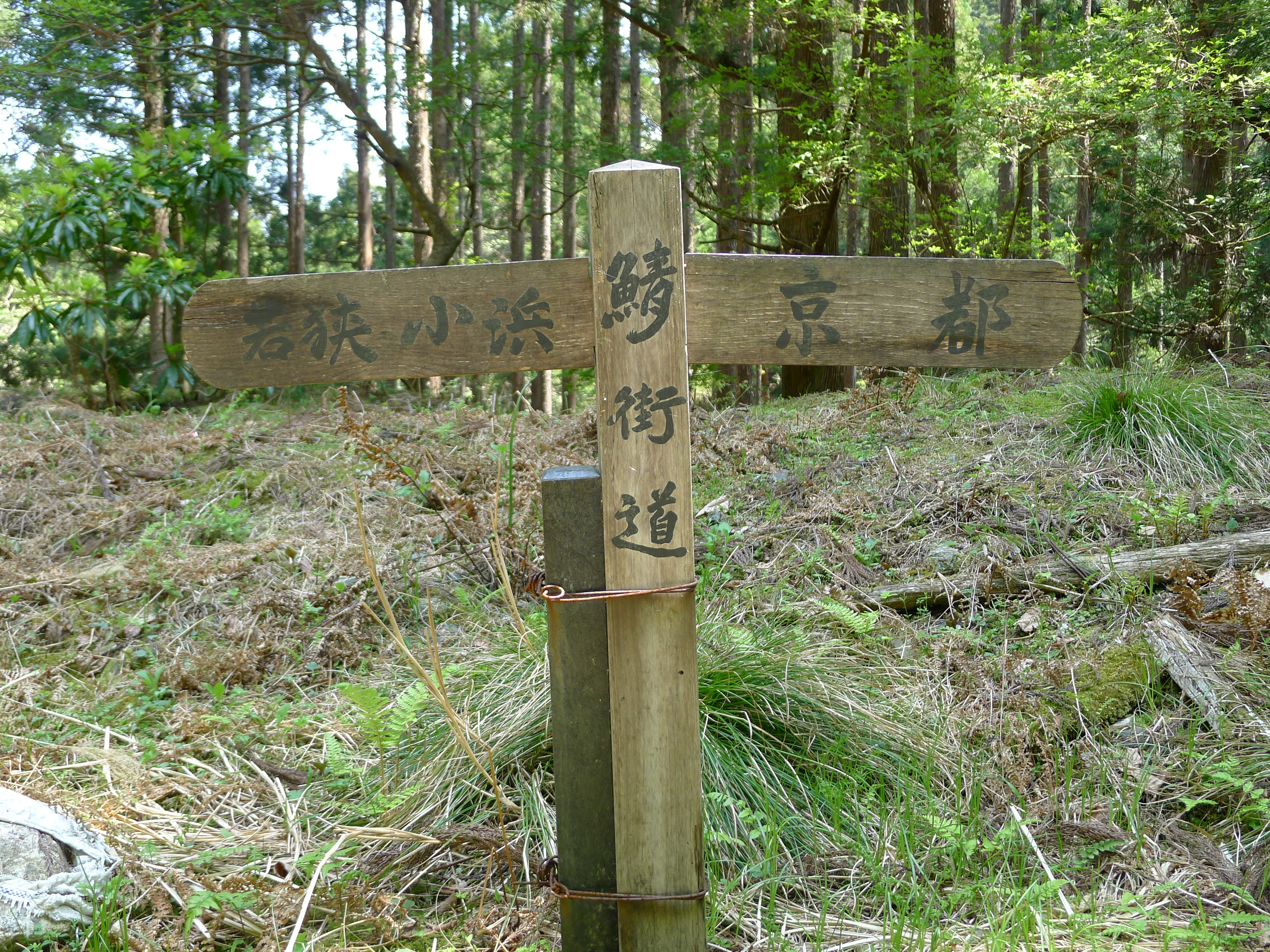
Saba-kaido Road

== See also ==
- National Parks of Japan
