= Chūō Alps Quasi-National Park =

Protected area in Nagano prefecture, Japan

- 中央アルプス国定公園
- IUCN category II (national park)
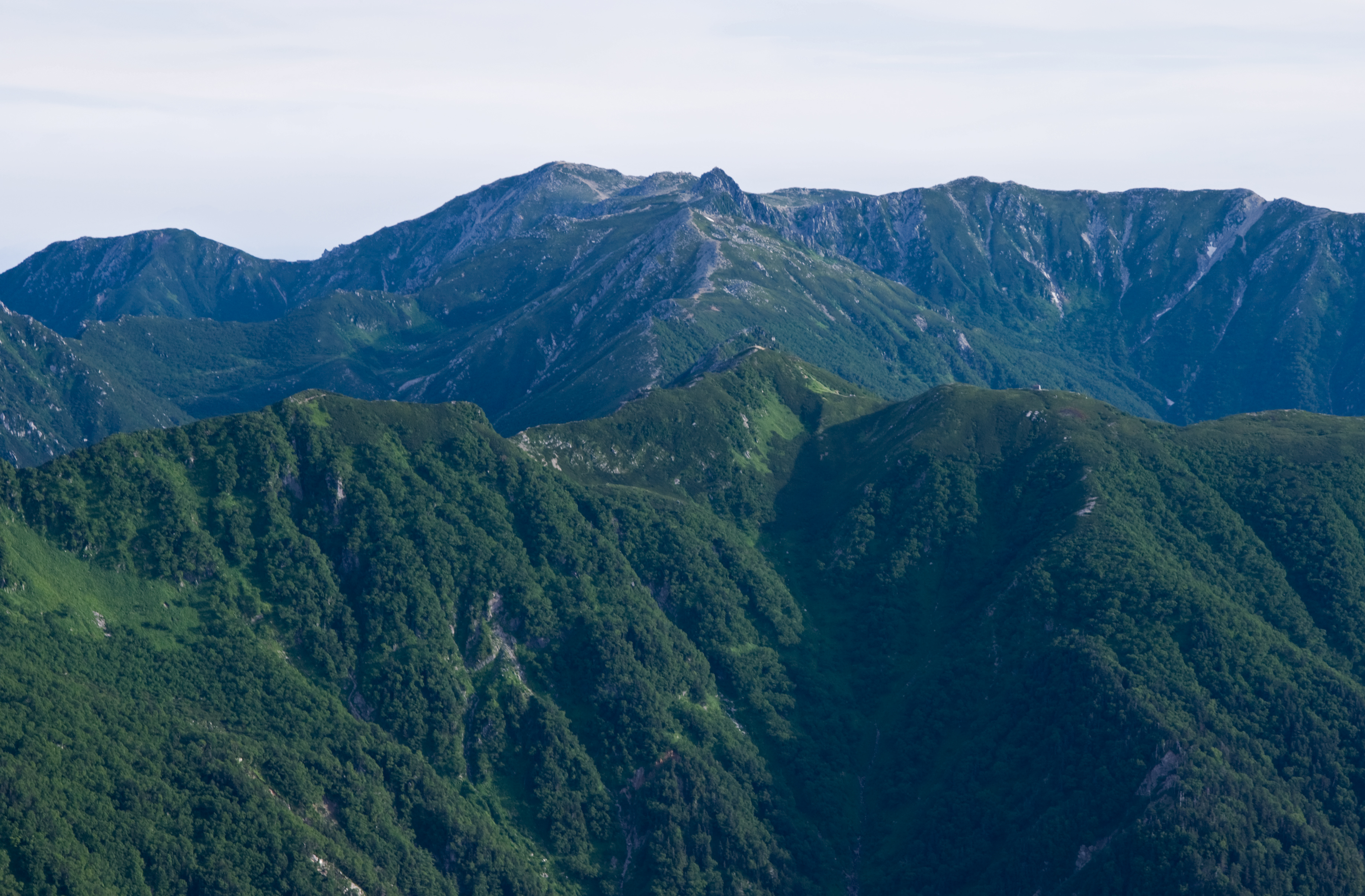
- Mount Kisokoma

- Location within Nagano Prefecture Location within Japan
- Interactive map of Chūō Alps Quasi-National Park
- Location: Nagano Prefecture, Japan
- Coordinates: 35°47′N 137°48′E
- Area: 351.16 square kilometres (135.58 sq mi)
- Established: 27 March 2020

Chūō Alps Quasi-National Park (中央アルプス国定公園, Chūō Arupusu Kokutei Kōen) is a Quasi-National Park in southern Nagano Prefecture, Japan. Established in 2020, the park has an area at time of foundation of 351.16 square kilometres (135.58 sq mi), corresponding exactly to that of the former Chūō Alps Prefectural Natural Park (中央アルプス県立自然公園), founded on 22 November 1951, which it supersedes and replaces. The Park's central feature is the Central Alps. Three separate areas of the park span the borders of thirteen municipalities: Achi, Agematsu, Iida, Iijima, Ina, Kiso, Komagane, Matsukawa, Miyada, Nagiso, Ōkuwa, Shiojiri, and Takamori.

== See also ==
- National Parks of Japan
- Japanese Alps
