= Echigo Sanzan-Tadami Quasi-National Park =

- 越後三山只見国定公園
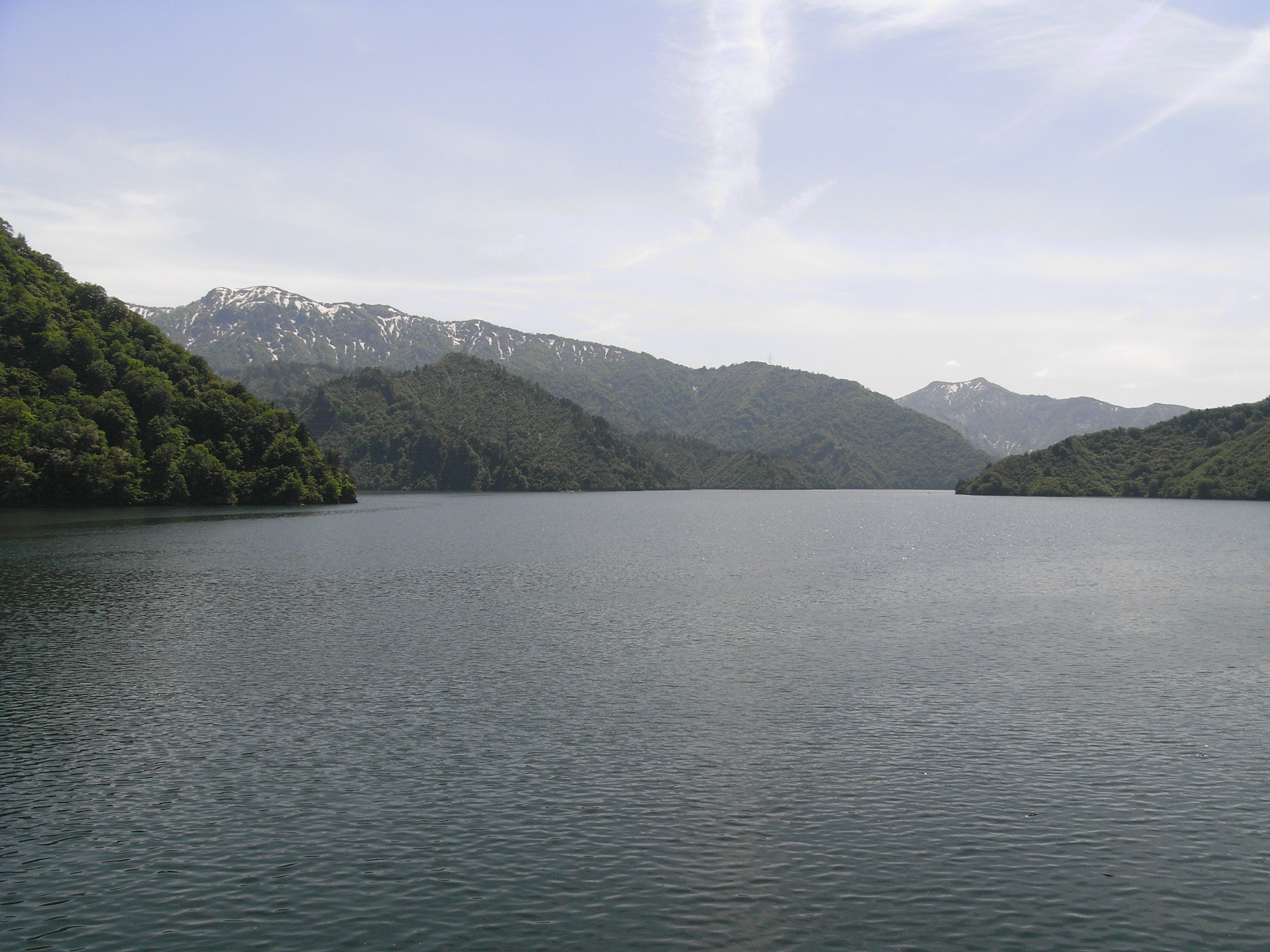
- Lake Tagokura

- Location within Japan
- Location: Fukushima Prefecture and Niigata Prefecture, Japan
- Coordinates: 37.158°N 139.08°E
- Area: 86,129 ha (212,830 acres)
- Established: 15 May 1973

Echigo Sanzan-Tadami Quasi-National Park (越後三山只見国定公園) is a Quasi-National Park in Fukushima Prefecture and Niigata Prefecture, Japan. Designated on 15 May 1973, it has an area of 86,129 ha (212,830 acres).

== See also ==
- List of national parks of Japan
