= Genkai Quasi-National Park =

Quasi-National Park in Kyushu, Japan

- 玄海国定公園
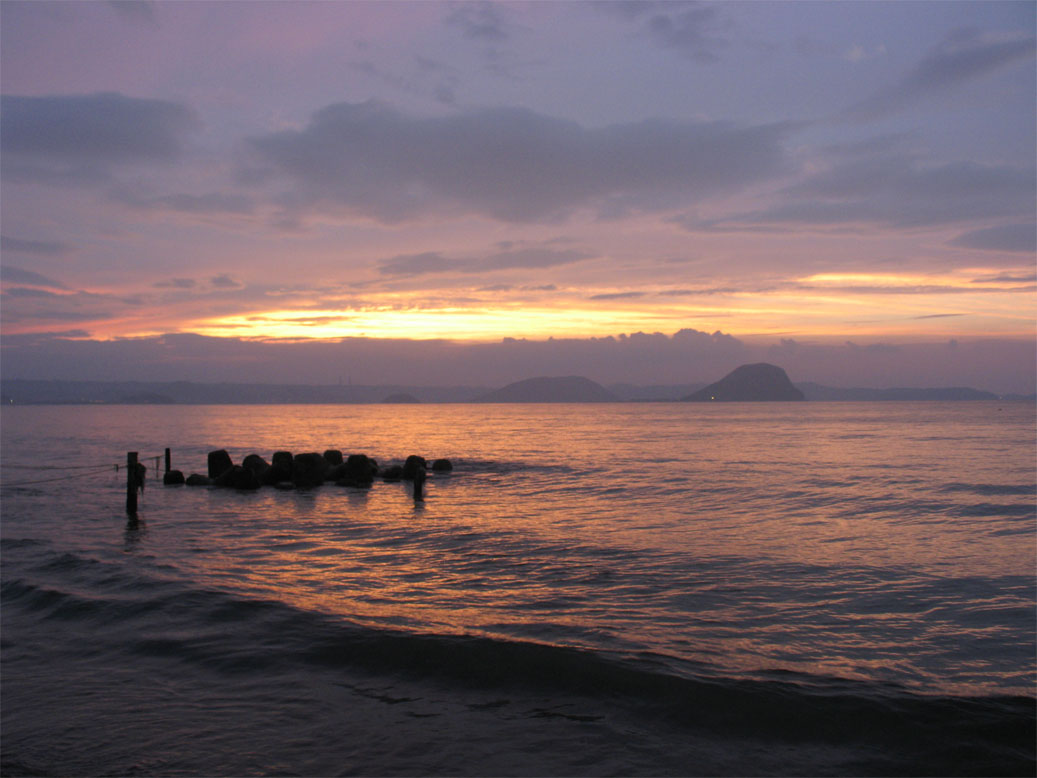
- Hamatama Beach

- Location within Japan
- Location: Fukuoka/Saga/Nagasaki Prefecture, Japan
- Coordinates: 33.603°N 130.18°E
- Area: 105.6 km^{2} (40.8 sq mi)
- Established: June 1, 1956

Genkai Kokutei Kōen (玄海国定公園) is a Quasi-National Park on the Genkai coast of Fukuoka Prefecture, Saga Prefecture, and Nagasaki Prefecture, Japan. It was founded on June 1, 1956 and has an area of 105.6 km^{2} (40.8 sq mi).

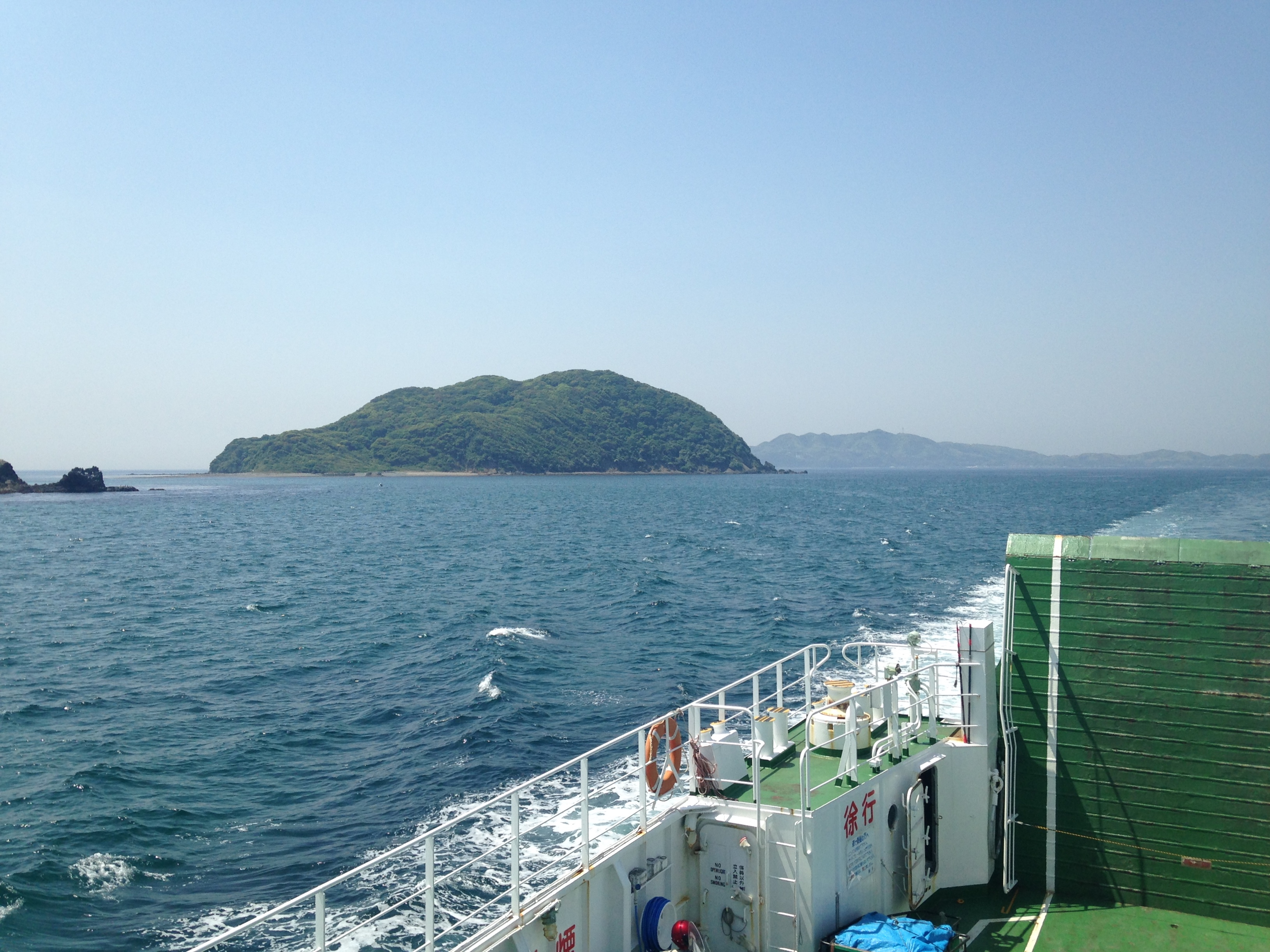

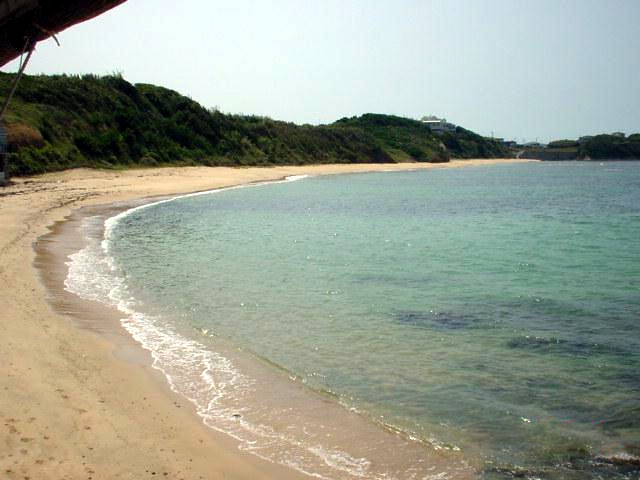

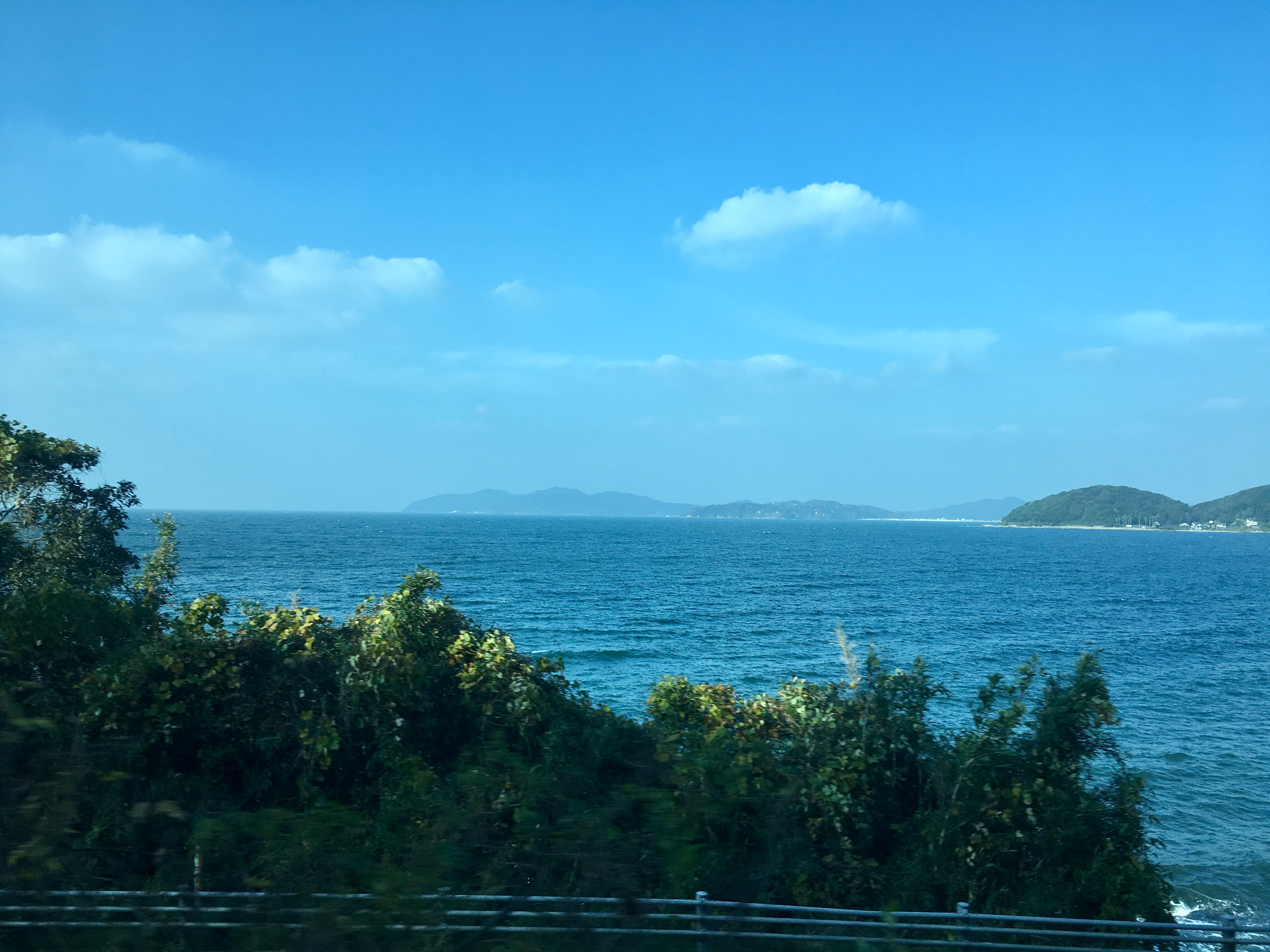

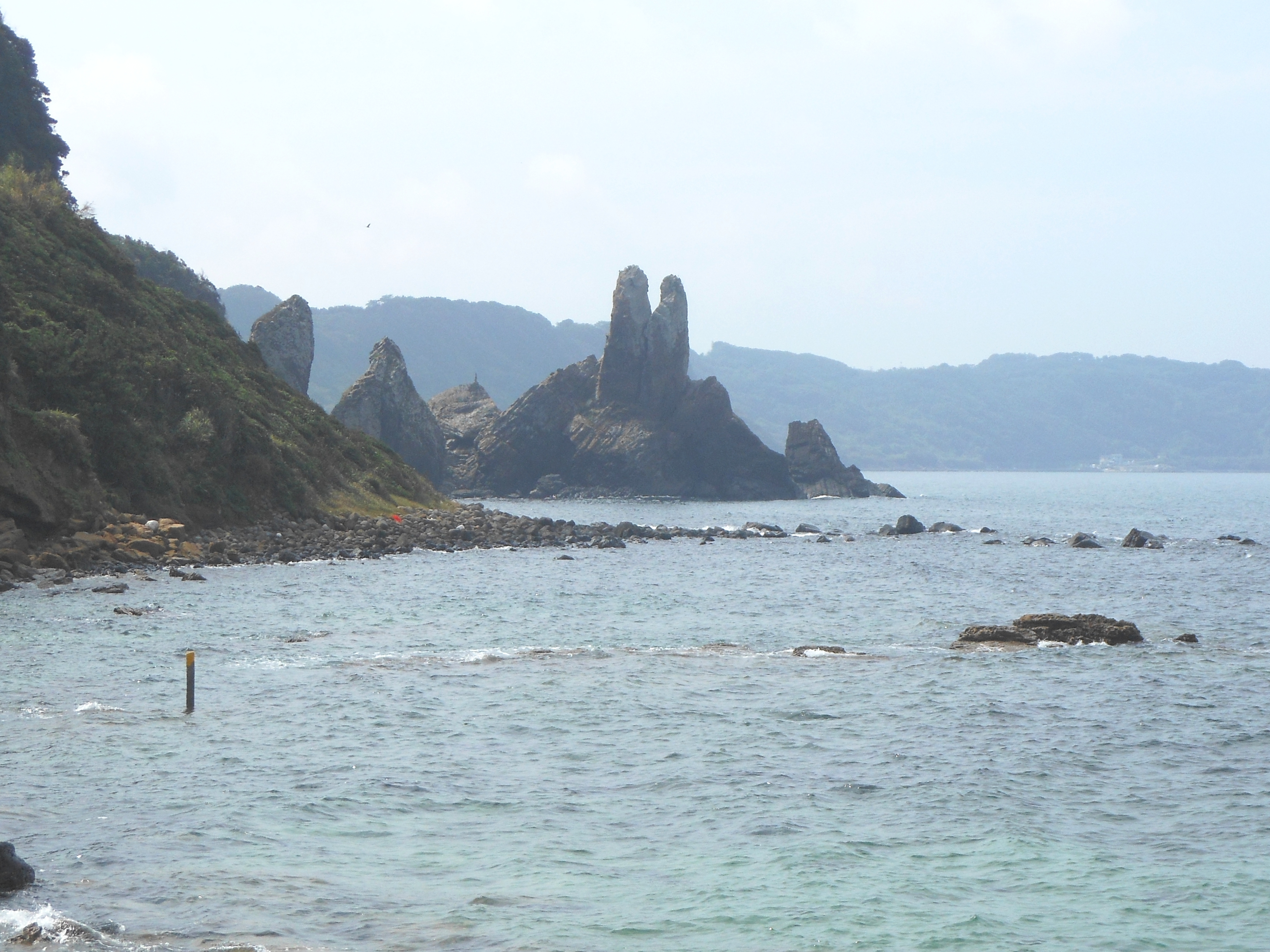

== See also ==
- List of national parks of Japan
