= Mount Ontake =

Volcanic mountain on the island of Honshu, Japan

- 御嶽山
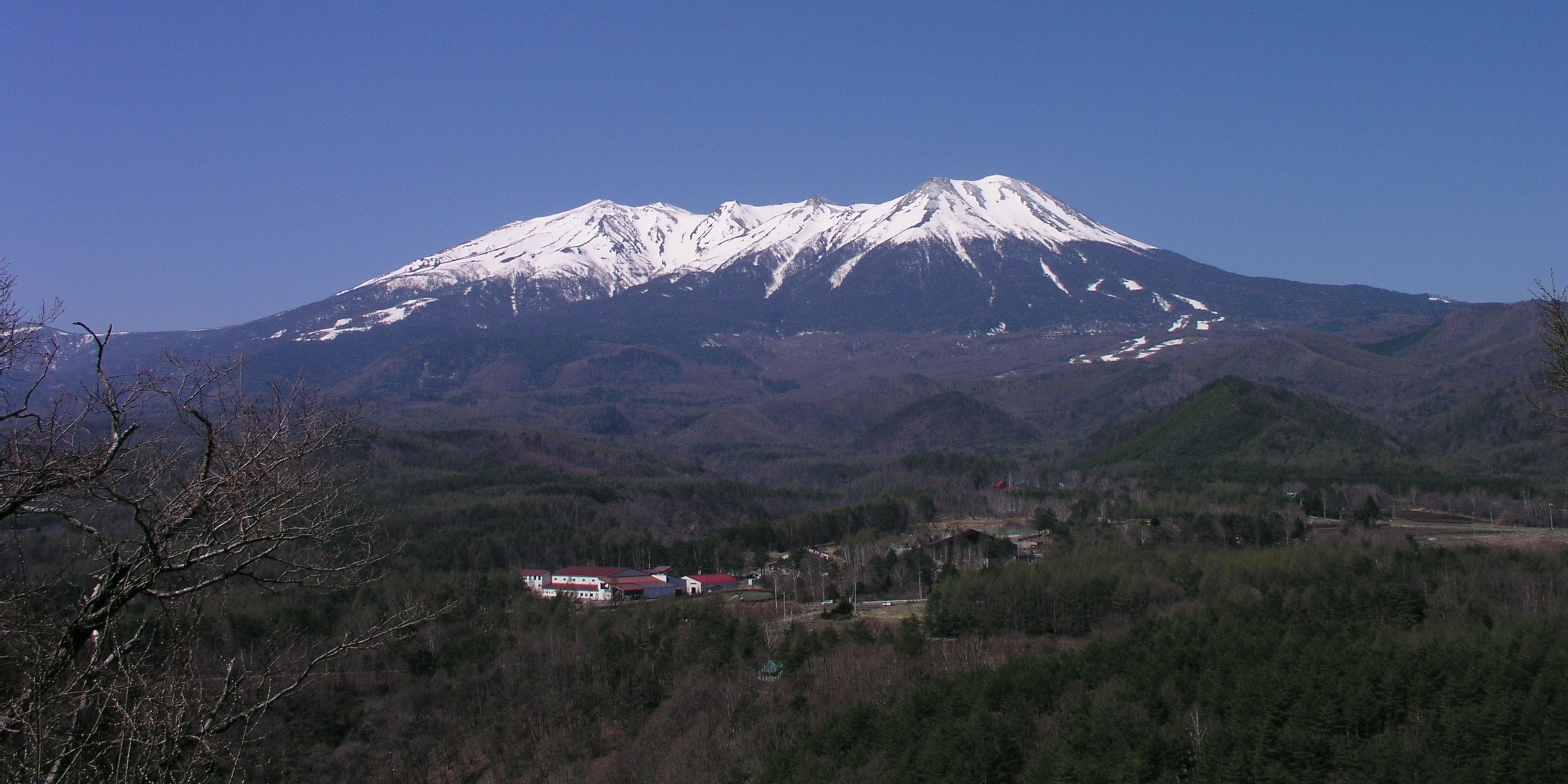
- Viewed from Kuzo Pass of Route 361

Highest point
- Elevation: 3,067 m (10,062 ft)
- Prominence: 1,712 m (5,617 ft)
- Listing: Ultra, Ribu; 100 famous mountains in Japan
- Coordinates: 35°53′35″N 137°28′50″E

Geography
- Location within Japan
- Location: Gifu and Nagano, Chūbu region, Japan
- Topo map(s): Geographical Survey Institute, 25000:1 御嶽山, 50000:1 御嶽山

Geology
- Mountain type: Stratovolcano
- Last eruption: September 27, 2014

Mount Ontake (御嶽山, Ontake-san), also referred to as Mount Kiso Ontake (木曽御嶽山, Kiso Ontake-san), is the 14th-highest mountain and second-highest volcano in Japan (after Mount Fuji) at 3,067 m (10,062 ft). It is included in Kyūya Fukada's 1964 book 100 Famous Japanese Mountains.

== Description ==
Mt. Ontake is located around 100 km (62 mi) northeast of Nagoya, and around 200 km (120 mi) west of Tokyo, at the borders of Kiso and Ōtaki, Nagano and Gero, Gifu. The volcano has five volcanic crater lakes, with Ni no Ike (二ノ池) at 2,905 m (9,531 ft) being the highest mountain lake in Japan.

Ontake is a major sacred mountain, and following shugendō practices, actors and artists have gone to the mountain to put themselves into trances to get divine inspiration for their creative activities.

== Eruptions ==
Ontake was thought to be inactive until October 1979, when it underwent a series of explosive phreatic eruptions which ejected 200,000 tons of ash, and had a volcanic explosivity index (VEI) of 2. There were minor non-explosive (VEI 0) phreatic eruptions in 1991 and 2007.

On September 27, 2014, at around 11:53 a.m. Japan Standard Time (UTC +9), the volcano erupted with a VEI of 3. The eruption was phreatic—caused by groundwater flashing to steam in a hydrothermal explosion—and there were no significant earthquakes that might have warned authorities in the lead up to it. The eruption was an extremely rare phenomenon, which made it difficult to take precautionary measures. At the time of the eruption, several hiking parties were undertaking ascents and descents of Ontake, with emergency descents having to be undertaken in the presence of ash clouds and falling rocks. Sixty-three people were killed; five bodies were never found.

== Gallery ==
Mount Ontake
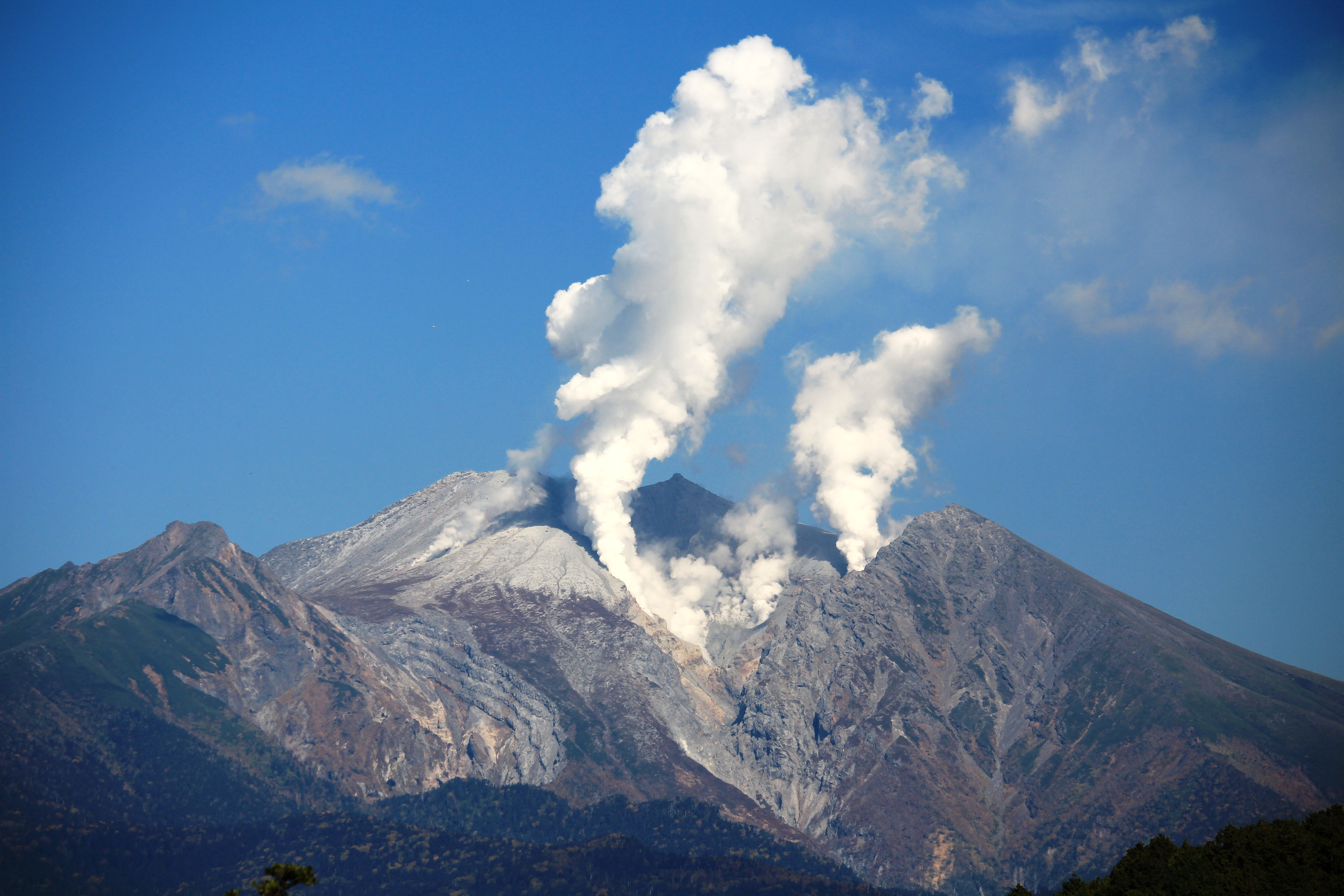
Mount Ontake seen from Kurakake Pass on October 11, 2014

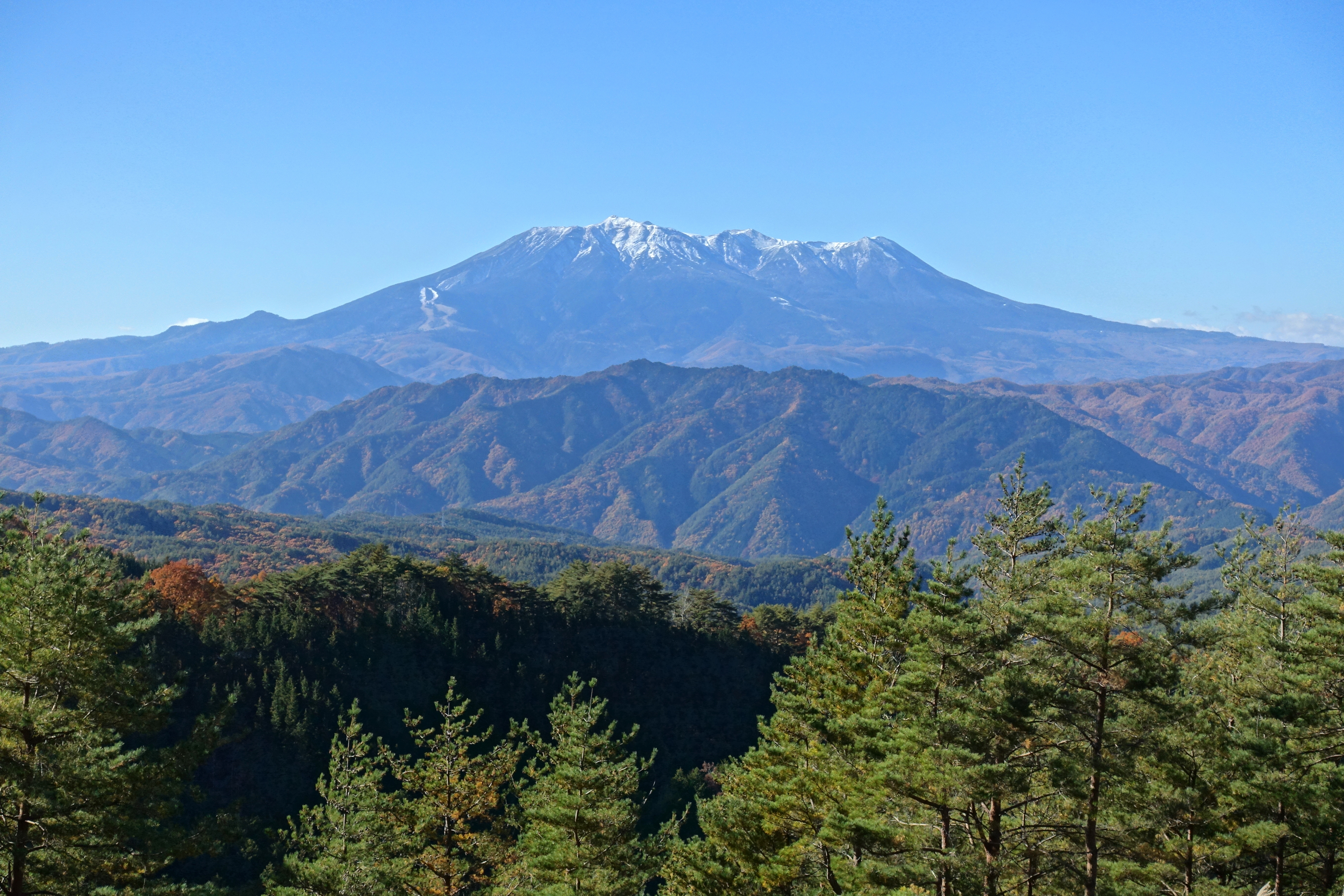
Mount Ontake from Kiso Valley

== See also ==
- 100 Famous Japanese Mountains
- List of mountains in Japan
- List of Ultras of Japan
- List of volcanoes in Japan
- Ontake Prefectural Natural Park
- Three-thousanders (in Japan)
- OSJ Ontake SkyRace
