= Ōita 4th district =

- Former Parliamentary constituency for the Japanese House of Representatives
- Prefecture: Ōita
- Proportional District: Kyushu

Former constituency
- Created: 1994
- Abolished: 2002

Ōita 4th district (大分県第4区, Ōita-ken dai-yonku or simply 大分4区, Ōita-yonku ) was a single-member constituency of the House of Representatives in the national Diet of Japan located in Ōita Prefecture.

== Areas covered ==
=== 1994 - 2002 ===
- Nakatsu
- Bungotakada
- Kitsuki
- Usa
- Nishikunisaki District
- Higashikunisaki District
- Hayami District
- Shimoge District
- Usa District

== List of representatives ==
Election	Representative	Party	Notes
1996	Katsuhiko Yokomitsu	SDP	
2000	Katsuhiko Yokomitsu	SDP	

== Election results ==
=== 2000 ===
2000
Party	Candidate	Votes	%	±%
Social Democratic	Katsuhiko Yokomitsu (Incumbent)	84,165	49.81	▼1.29
LDP	Ren Sato	78,468	46.44	New
JCP	Mitoshi Mikeda	5,195	3.07	▲0.25
Liberal League	Hideyuki Ozaki	1,144	0.68	New
Majority		5,697	3.37	
Registered electors				
Turnout				
Social Democratic hold				

=== 1996 ===
1996
Party	Candidate	Votes	%	±%
Social Democratic	Katsuhiko Yokomitsu	86,068	51.10	New
New Frontier	Takeshi Iwaya	77,621	46.08	New
JCP	Mitoshi Mikeda	4,757	2.82	New
Majority		8,447	5.02	
Registered electors				
Turnout				
Social Democratic win (new seat)				
