= Ōita 3rd district =

- Parliamentary constituency for the Japanese House of Representatives
- Numbered map of Ōita Prefecture single-member districts
- Prefecture: Ōita
- Proportional District: Kyushu
- Electorate: 292,443

Current constituency
- Created: 1994
- Seats: One
- Party: LDP
- Representative: Takeshi Iwaya
- Municipalities: Cities of Beppu, Bungotakada, Kitsuki, Nakatsu, Kunisaki, and Usa. Districts of Hayami, and Higashikunisaki.

Ōita 3rd district (大分県第3区, Ōita-ken dai-sanku or simply 大分3区, Ōita-sanku ) is a single-member constituency of the House of Representatives in the national Diet of Japan located in Ōita Prefecture.

In the 2026 election, the incumbent, former Foreign Minister (Oct 2024–Oct 2025) Takeshi Iwaya; faced several conservative challengers, including activist Uryu Hirano, who criticized him for his alleged 'weak stance' on China.

== Areas covered ==
=== Since 2013 ===
- Beppu
- Bungotakada
- Kitsuki
- Nakatsu
- Kunisaki
- Usa
- Hayami District
- Higashikunisaki District

=== 2002 - 2013 ===
- Beppu
- Bungotakada
- Kitsuki
- Nakatsu
- Usa
- Hayami District
- Higashikunisaki District
- Nishikunisaki District
- Shimoge District
- Usa District

=== 1994 - 2002 ===
- Beppu
- Hita
- Ōita District
- Kusu District
- Hita District

== List of representatives ==
Election	Representative	Party	Notes
1996	Eijiro Hata	NFP	
1996	Eijiro Hata	Sun	
1996	Eijiro Hata	GGP	
1996	Eijiro Hata	Democratic	
2000	Takeshi Iwaya	LDP	
2003	Takeshi Iwaya	LDP	
2005	Takeshi Iwaya	LDP	
2009	Katsuhiko Yokomitsu	Democratic	
2012	Takeshi Iwaya	LDP	
2014	Takeshi Iwaya	LDP	
2017	Takeshi Iwaya	LDP	
2021	Takeshi Iwaya	LDP	
2024	Takeshi Iwaya	LDP	
2026	Takeshi Iwaya	LDP	

== Election results ==
=== 2026 ===
2026
Party	Candidate	Votes	%	±%
LDP	Takeshi Iwaya (Incumbent)	57,996	34.6	▼20.6
Centrist Reform	Kayako Kobayashi	50,681	30.2	▼7.9
Independent	Uryu Hirano	24,260	14.5	
CPJ	Kyōko Iwanaga	18,768	11.2	
Sanseitō	Kie Nonaka	15,955	9.5	
Registered electors		287,222		
Turnout			59.73	▼3.66
LDP hold				

=== 2024 ===
2024
Party	Candidate	Votes	%	±%
LDP	Takeshi Iwaya (Incumbent)	87,301	55.23	▼3.19
CDP	Kayako Kobayashi	60,207	38.09	▼3.49
JCP	Mitsuyoshi Otsuka	10,550	6.68	N/A
Majority		27,094	17.14	
Registered electors		291,486		
Turnout			56.07	▼3.60
LDP hold				

=== 2021 ===
2021
Party	Candidate	Votes	%	±%
LDP	Takeshi Iwaya (Incumbent)	102,807	58.42	▲4.26
CDP	Katsuhiko Yokomitsu	73,159	41.58	New
Majority		29,648	16.84	
Registered electors		301,700		
Turnout			59.67	▼0.10
LDP hold				

=== 2017 ===
2017
Party	Candidate	Votes	%	±%
LDP	Takeshi Iwaya (Incumbent)	99,412	54.16	▼7.51
CDP	Katsuhiko Yokomitsu (Won PR seat)	84,133	45.84	New
Majority		15,279	8.32	
Registered electors		312,610		
Turnout			59.77	▲3.04
LDP hold				

=== 2014 ===
2014
Party	Candidate	Votes	%	±%
LDP	Takeshi Iwaya (Incumbent)	106,257	61.67	▲11.33
Democratic	Hideki Urano	48,389	28.08	▼3.42
JCP	Mitsuyoshi Otsuka	17,657	10.25	▲6.11
Majority		57,868	33.59	
Registered electors		312,365		
Turnout			56.73	
LDP hold				

=== 2012 ===
2012
Party	Candidate	Votes	%	±%
LDP	Takeshi Iwaya	100,606	50.34	▲2.85
Democratic	Katsuhiko Yokomitsu (Incumbent)	62,949	31.50	▼19.54
Your	Masatoshi Kan	28,013	14.02	New
JCP	Mitsuyoshi Otsuka	8,301	4.14	N/A
Majority		37,657	18.84	
Registered electors				
Turnout				
LDP gain from Democratic				

=== 2009 ===
2009
Party	Candidate	Votes	%	±%
Democratic	Katsuhiko Yokomitsu	121,031	51.04	▲4.12
LDP	Takeshi Iwaya (Incumbent) (Won PR seat)	112,602	47.49	▼5.59
Happiness Realization	Tetsuya Toshimitsu	3,489	1.47	New
Majority		8,429	3.55	
Registered electors				
Turnout				
Democratic gain from LDP				

=== 2005 ===
2005
Party	Candidate	Votes	%	±%
LDP	Takeshi Iwaya (Incumbent)	127,656	53.08	▲1.82
Democratic	Katsuhiko Yokomitsu (Won PR seat)	112,833	46.92	N/A
Majority		14,823	6.16	
Registered electors				
Turnout				
LDP hold				

=== 2003 ===
2003
Party	Candidate	Votes	%	±%
LDP	Takeshi Iwaya (Incumbent)	123,798	51.26	▼9.05
Social Democratic	Katsuhiko Yokomitsu (Won PR seat)	111,180	46.04	New
JCP	Tsutomu Ogawa	6,521	2.70	▼3.68
Majority		12,618	5.22	
Registered electors				
Turnout				
LDP hold				

=== 2000 ===
2000
Party	Candidate	Votes	%	±%
LDP	Takeshi Iwaya	95,046	60.31	▲19.05
Democratic	Taro Nakamura	50,024	31.74	New
JCP	Tsutomu Ogawa	10,057	6.38	▼0.37
Liberal League	Tsuneaki Umeki	2,470	1.57	▲0.27
Majority		45,022	28.57	
Registered electors				
Turnout				
LDP gain from Democratic				

=== 1996 ===
1996
Party	Candidate	Votes	%	±%
New Frontier	Eijiro Hata	77,936	50.69	New
LDP	Tetsuaki Makino	63,440	41.26	New
JCP	Yōko Hino	10,375	6.75	New
Liberal League	Tsuneaki Umeki	1,998	1.30	New
Majority		14,496	9.43	
Registered electors				
Turnout				
New Frontier win (new seat)				
