= Yokomitsu =

Yokomitsu is a Japanese surname. Notable people with the surname include:

- Katsuhiko Yokomitsu (born 1943), Japanese actor and politician
- Riichi Yokomitsu (1898–1947), Japanese writer
