= Uryu Hirano =

Japanese activist (born 1994)

- 平野 雨龍
- Born: Suzuko Ogino; January 31, 1994 (age 32); Chiba, Chiba prefecture
- Other name: Suzuko Hirano
- Organization: Uryu-kai
- Known for: Japan and Hong Kong activism
- Political party: independent

Suzuko Ogino, (Japanese: 荻野 鈴子; born 31 January 1994) known by her stage name Uryu Hirano (平野 雨龍) and Suzuko Hirano (平野 鈴子) before 2021, is a Japanese right-wing politician, political activist, and former model. She is the representative of the social organization "Uryu-kai".

Hirano came to public attention following the 2019 Hong Kong pro-democracy movement and has been described as Japan's leading figure opposing the Extradition Bill to China, Taiwanese media occasionally referring to Hirano as the "Anti-Extradition Goddess." She has been active in advocating for the protection of Uyghur human rights and a review of Japan's immigration policies toward Chinese nationals. Her activities have been reported in media of both Taiwan and Hong Kong.

Hirano ran as an independent candidate from the Tokyo constituency in the 2025 Japanese House of Councillors election, becoming the youngest candidate in the race under an anti-immigrant campaign focusing on strengthening restrictions on Chinese immigration and deepening relations with Taiwan and Hong Kong. Although did not reach the vote threshold for being elected, she received 235,411 votes, placing 14th out of 32 candidates and the highest among all independent candidates.

== Political activism ==
Hirano had visited Hong Kong several times before the 2019 anti-extradition bill protests began, and claims to have many friends there. Through Twitter and other social media platforms, Hirano learned about the ongoing protests and, after watching activist Agnes Chow explain the 2019 extradition bill on television, she decided to start protesting. At the age of 25 Hirano joined the "Emergency Action to Protect Hong Kong’s Freedom and Democracy" rally in Shibuya on 13 June 2019 — her first-ever participation in a demonstration. The next day, upon learning that another protest was being held six hours later in Nagoya, she left her work, took the Tōkaidō Shinkansen from Tokyo to Kanayama station and gave a speech at the rally in front of the station. The translated version of her speech was later uploaded online and viewed over 400,000 times. Hirano stated that if the amendment were passed, "Hong Kong would no longer be Hong Kong," expressing concern that the Chinese Communist Party might expand its influence over Taiwan, East Asia, and even as far as Okinawa and Tokyo.

Hirano organized her first demonstration against the extradition bill on 29 June 2019 in Tokyo. She declared that she would hold weekly "Solidarity Actions to Defend Hong Kong with the World" every Saturday, marching from Hibiya Park to Tokyo Station. Hirano started declining modelling jobs to focus on activism and produced banners at her own expense. Participation numbers were often smaller than expected, leading her to lament Japan's general indifference toward politics. Nonetheless, Hirano stated that she would never regret standing with Hong Kong.Hirano also voiced anger toward mainland Chinese who erased the slogan "Liberate Hong Kong, Revolution of Our Times" written on ema plaques at shrines or discouraged others from supporting the protests.

In addition to organising marches, Hirano used social media to raise awareness about the situation in Hong Kong, conducted fundraising campaigns, and participated in the "#eye4hk" challenge by posting a selfie covering her right eye. On 11 August 2019, Hirano attended Comiket, where she and several international students cosplayed Hong Kong protesters in helmets and masks. On 6 September, Hirano attended a Hong Kong press event, where she criticised the police for an indiscriminate arrest of a Japanese national on Prince Edward station on 31 August and denying consular contact. She also said she had been at Prince Edward station on 3 September and later learned on Twitter that a 21-year-old protester had suffered a cervical spine injury, which enraged her deeply. Declaring her resolve to "fight thoroughly alongside the people of Hong Kong," Hirano said she had been frequently attacked and even threatened with death by Wumao netizens. In July 2019, Hirano launched a fundraising campaign in Japan, successfully raising ¥1.7 million (approximately HK$100,000) by early November. The funds were donated to the 612 Humanitarian Relief Fund in Hong Kong. Hirano attempted to enter Hong Kong in June 2024, but was denied entry under Article 11 of the Immigration Ordinance and deported.

== Elections ==
Hirano ran as an independent candidate in July 2025 House of Councillors election from the Tokyo constituency, campaigning under the slogan "A Heisei-born woman for the National Diet!". Her campaign has been described as having an anti-immigrant stance without any concrete policy packages. Although she did not reach the vote count threshold to get elected, she received 235,411 votes, placing 14th out of 32 candidates, getting the highest vote count among all independent candidates without party backing.

In the 2026 Japanese general election she ran for a seat in the House of Representatives in the Ōita 3rd district, challenging former Foreign Minister Takeshi Iwaya. She ended up third with 14.5% of the vote.
