= Showa no Machi =

Area of Bungotakada, Japan

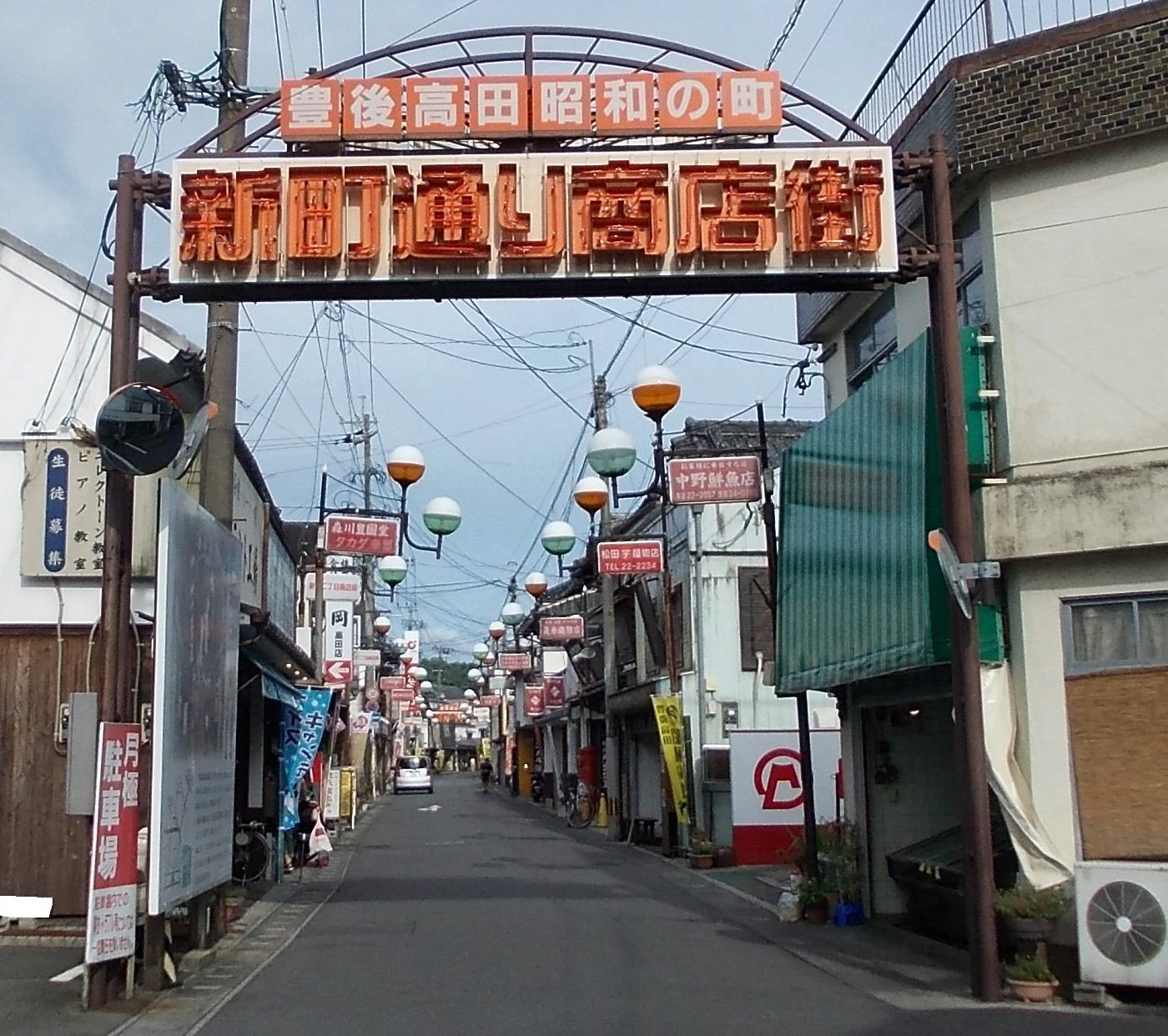
Sign marking the entrance to Showa no Machi's shopping streets

Showa no Machi (昭和の町, しょうわのまち), also known as Showa Town, is an area in central Bungotakada City, Ōita Prefecture which consists of shopping streets reminiscent of 1950s and 1960s Japan.

It features various gift shops selling items which were popular during Japan's Shōwa era and is among Bungotakada's top sightseeing spots.

== History ==
In the 1960s, following the establishment of large stores in the area and depopulation, the once flourishing shopping streets of Bungotakada began to decline. Due to this decline, very few new buildings were constructed in Bungotakada's central shopping streets.

As a result, more than 70% of the buildings in the current Showa no Machi area remained as they were in the 1950s when a revitalization project began in 2001. This project took advantage of the abundant Showa-era buildings to create a 1950s Japan themed series of shopping streets.

== Attractions ==
- Bonnet Bus: a refurbished bus from the 1950s typically on display. Visitors can ride the bus for free around the shopping streets on weekends.
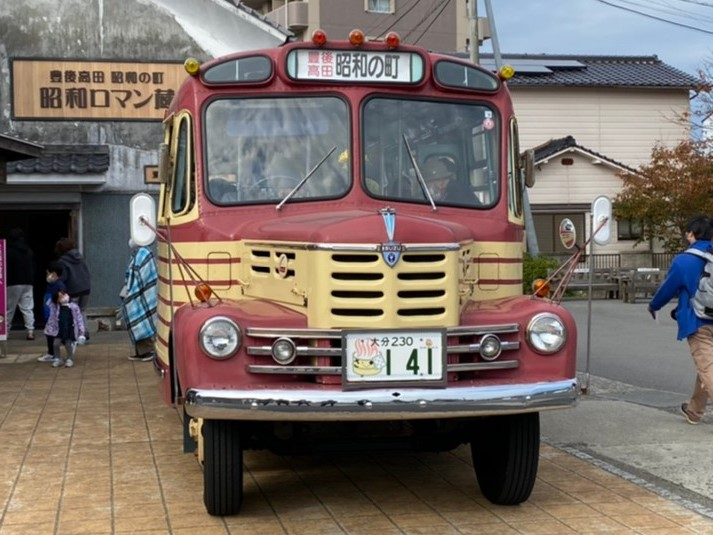
  Bonnet Bus
- Showa Roman Gura (昭和ロマン蔵) a former warehouse that now contains various Shōwa era themed attractions such as a 1950s-style classroom and a museum with 40,000 toys.
- Various shops selling clothes, candies, toys, and other goods which were popular in 1950s Japan.
