= Kyushu Natural Animal Park African Safari =

Safari park in Ōita Prefecture, Japan

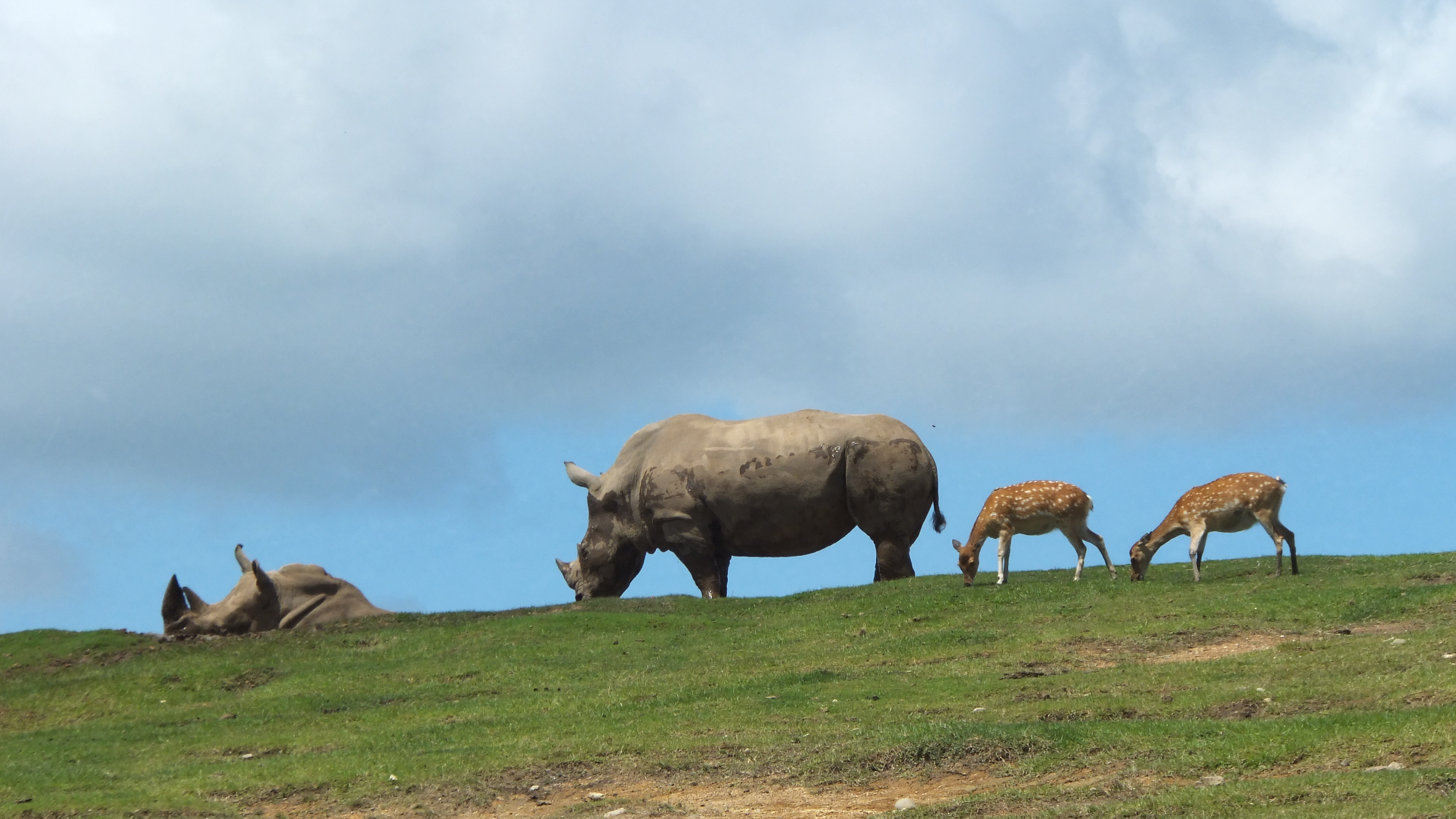
- Interactive map of Kyushu Natural Animal Park African Safari
- 33.35447047282492°N 131.4115502962999°E
- Date opened: May 29, 1976
- Location: 872-0722 Ōita Prefecture, Usa, Ajimumachi Minamihata, ２−1755-1
- Land area: 1.15 km²
- No. of animals: About 1,400
- No. of species: About 70
- Owner: Kyushu African Lion Safari Company (Part of the Koizumi Group)
- Director: Iwai Kanda
- Website: Official website

Kyushu Natural Animal Park African Safari (九州自然動物公園アフリカンサファリ, Kyūshū Shizen Dōbutsu Kōen Afurikan Safari), also referred to as simply African Safari, is Japan's largest safari park and is located at the base of the Kunisaki Peninsula in Usa, Ōita Prefecture.

== Overview ==
=== Interaction Zone ===
The park is separated into two "zones." In the Fureai Zone, or "Interaction Zone," visitors can interact with and even touch various animals such as rabbits, red kangaroos, and miniature horses while exploring the area on foot. In the area, there are various gift shops and restaurants. There are also both a "dog salon" and a "cat salon" in which visitors can directly interact with the animals.

=== Safari Zone ===
The Safari Zone is the large safari-style section of the park. This safari is divided into sections, each modeled on a different natural environment. Each animal species is placed in the section which most closely resembles their natural habitat.

The sections within the Safari Zone are each separated by fences and security gates. However, there are no fences separating visitors from the animals during the safari. Visitors can either choose to travel the park in their personal car or ride the park's "Jungle Bus." Visitors are prohibited from exiting their vehicles while in the Safari Zone.

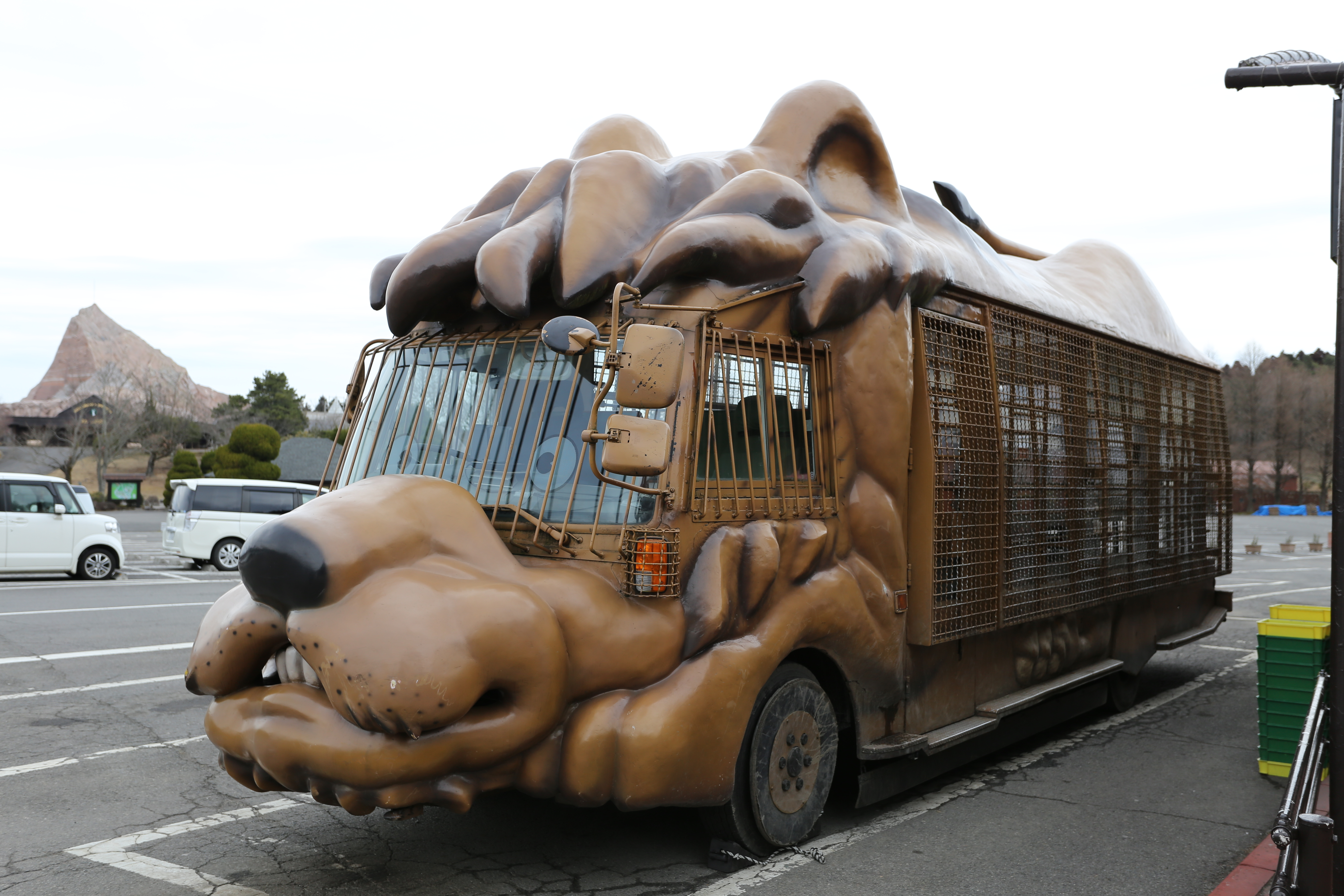
Jungle Bus

Visitors who choose to ride Jungle Bus must pay for a bus ticket in addition to the park's admission fee. Tickets are sold on a first-come, first-served basis. During the 50 minute ride through the park, visitors are able to feed some of the animals through the Jungle Bus' cage. Because of this, visitors are able to get closer to the animals by riding the Jungle Bus than by riding in their personal vehicle.

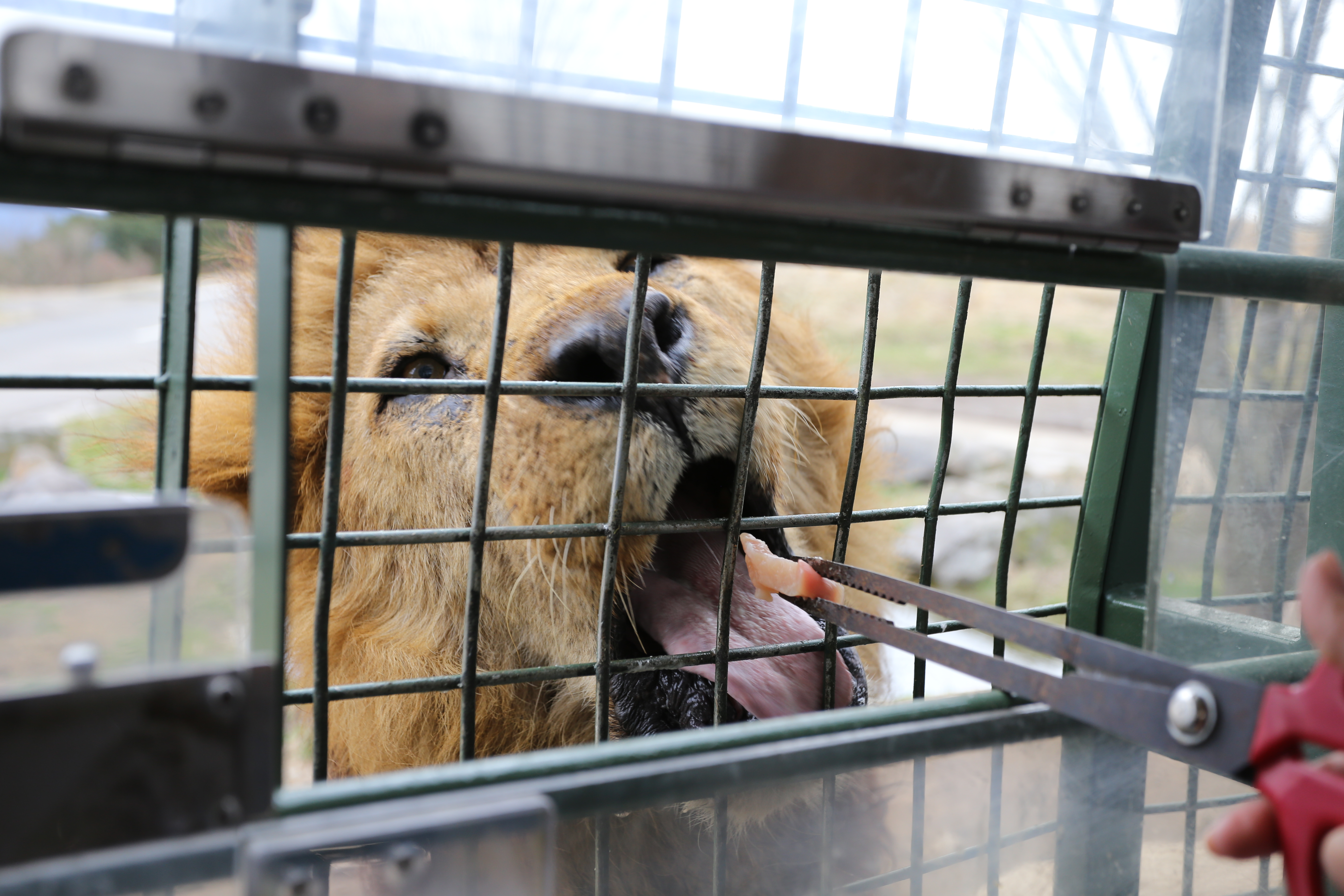
Feeding the lions from the Jungle Bus

=== Safari Zone animals ===
Animals in the Safari Zone include American black bears, giraffes, lions, elephants, mouflons, cheetahs, camels, bison, Bengal tigers, white rhinoceroses, spotted hyenas and more.

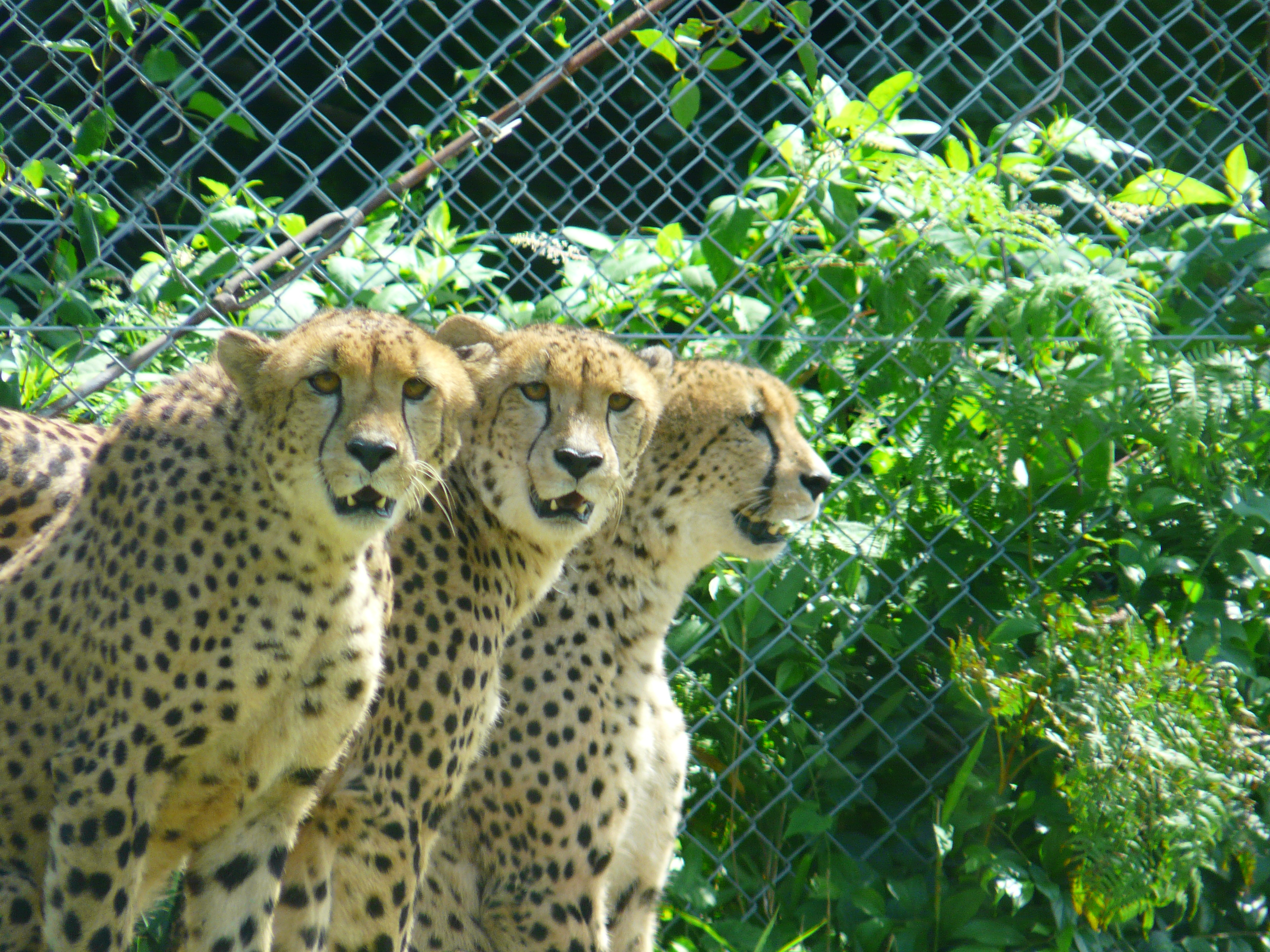
Cheetahs in the safari park
