= Katsuhiko Yokomitsu =

Japanese actor and politician

- 横光 克彦
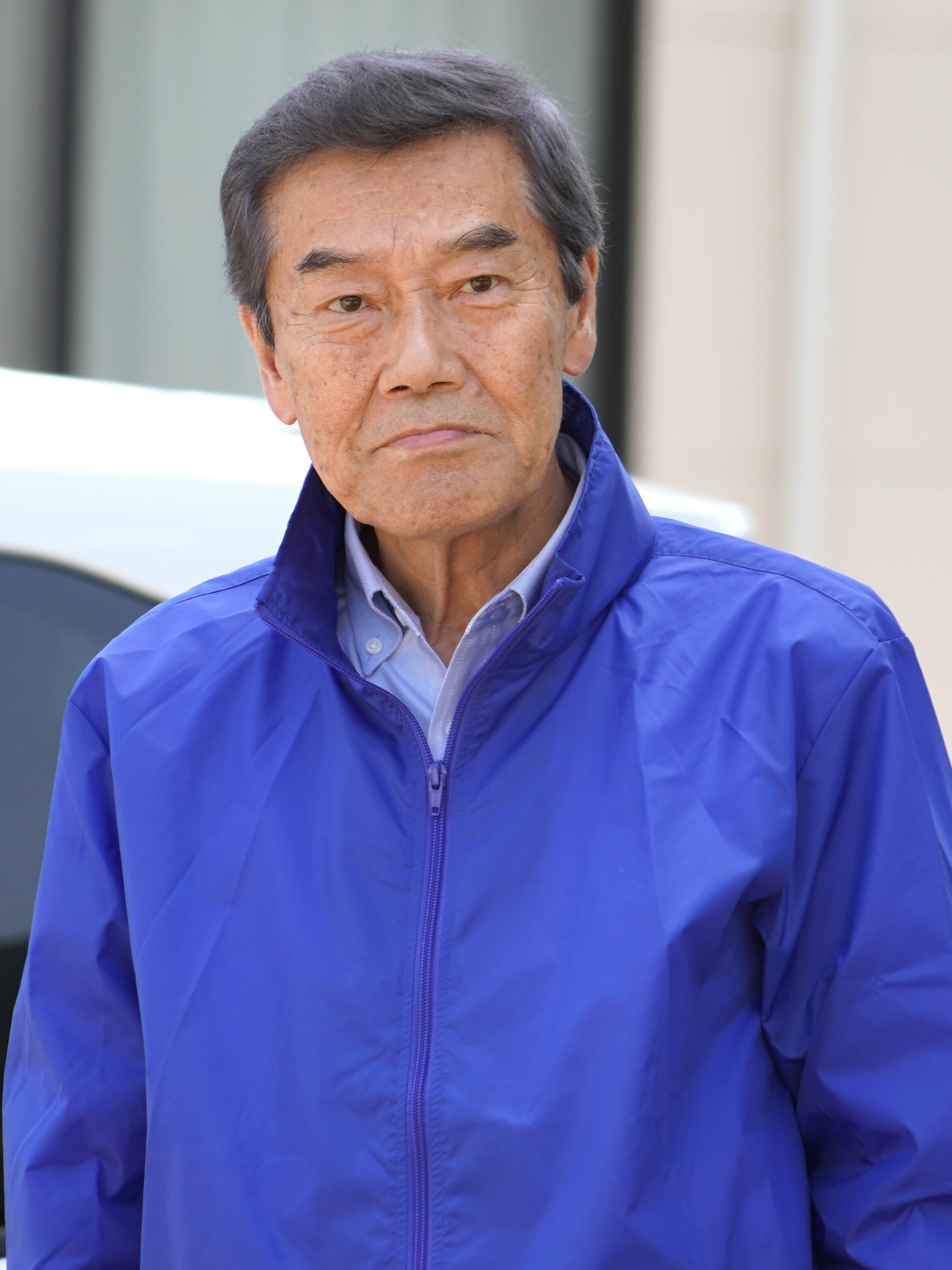
- Yokomitsu in 2023

Member of the House of Representatives
- In office 23 October 2017 – 14 October 2021
- Constituency: Kyushu PR
- In office 18 July 1993 – 16 November 2012
- Preceded by: Takeshi Iwaya
- Succeeded by: Takeshi Iwaya
- Constituency: Ōita 2nd (1993–1996); Ōita 4th (1996–2003); Kyushu PR (2003–2009); Ōita 3rd (2009–2012)

Personal details
- Born: 4 November 1943 (age 82) Taiwan, Empire of Japan
- Party: CDP (since 2017)
- Other political affiliations: JSP (before 1996); SDP (1996–2005); DPJ (2005–2016); DP (2016–2017)
- Education: University of Kitakyushu

Katsuhiko Yokomitsu (横光 克彦, Yokomitsu Katsuhiko; born 4 November 1943) is a Japanese actor and politician of the Constitutional Democratic Party (CDP), who serves as a member of the House of Representatives in the National Diet (national legislature).

== Overviews ==
A native of Usa, Ōita and graduate of the University of Kitakyushu, he was elected to the House of Representatives for the first time in 1993 as an independent. He later joined the Social Democratic Party and then Democratic Party of Japan. In 2011, he assumed the office of Senior Vice-Minister of the Environment. After General Election 2012, which he lost the seat, he announced his retirement from politics and return to the entertainment industry. Shin Godzilla in which he played the role of Minister of the Environment is one of the most major movies after his return.

He made a comeback to politics in 2017. He joined the CDP prior to the 2017 general election and subsequently ran in his former Oita 3rd district seat. He was defeated by the incumbent Takeshi Iwaya by a majority of 15,279 votes, but was elected in the proportional representation block.
