= Kakaji, Ōita =

Dissolved municipality in Ōita prefecture, Japan

Kakaji (香々地町, Kakaji-chō) was a town located in Nishikunisaki District, Ōita Prefecture, Japan.

As of 2003, the town had an estimated population of 3,604 and a density of 95.62 persons per km^{2}. The total area was 37.69 km^{2}.

On March 31, 2005, Kakaji, along with the town of Matama (also from Nishikunisaki District), was merged into the expanded city of Bungotakada.
