= Bungotakada =

Bungotakada 豊後高田市
- City
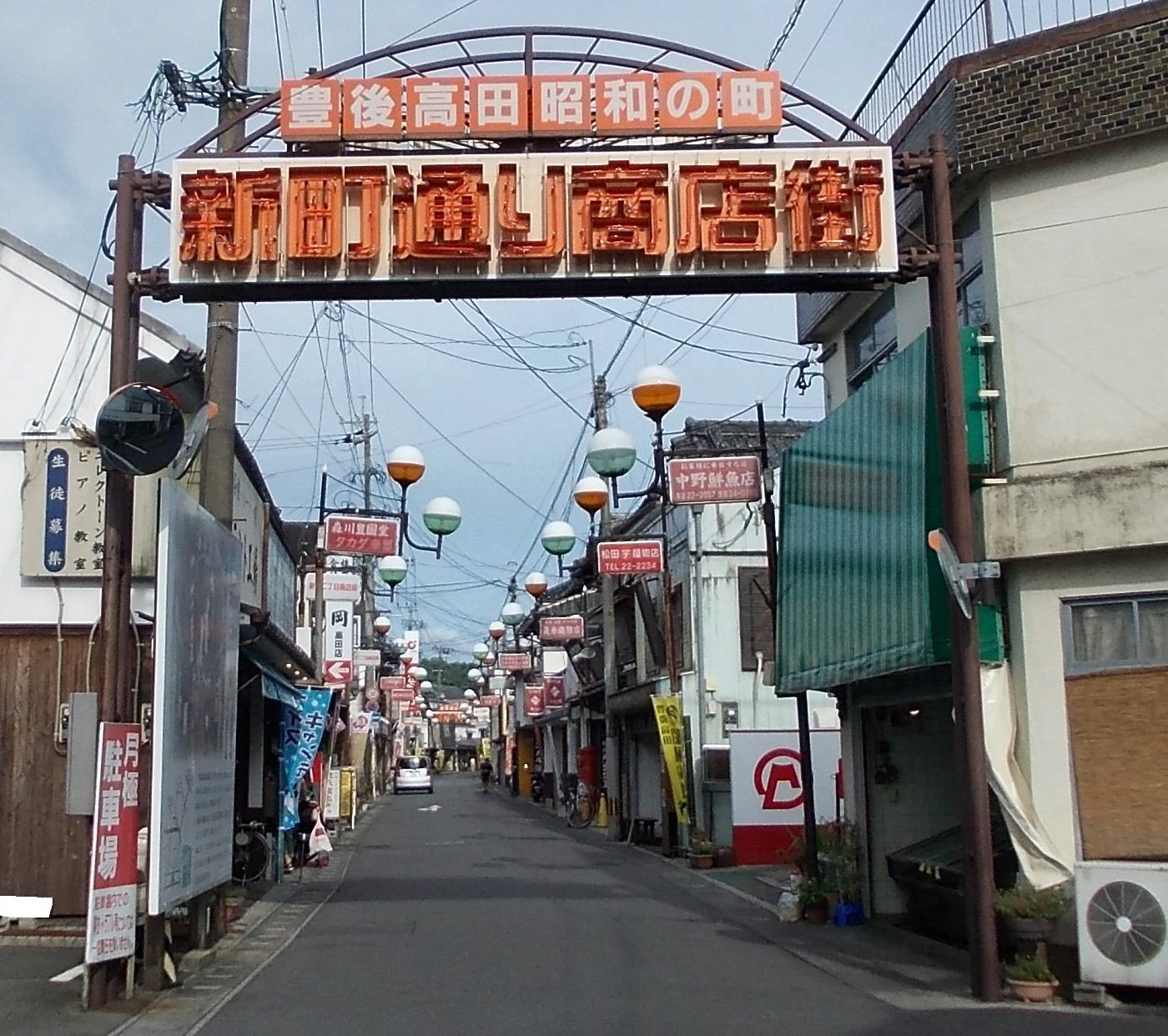
- Bunngotakada's Showa no Machi

- Flag Emblem

- Location in Japan
- Coordinates: 33°33′22″N 131°26′49″E
- Country: Japan
- Region: Kyushu
- Prefecture: Ōita

Government
  - Mayor: Toshio Sasaki (since 2017)

Area
  - Total: 206.24 km^{2} (79.63 sq mi)

Population (November 30, 2023)
  - Total: 21,980
  - Density: 106.6/km^{2} (276.0/sq mi)
- Time zone: UTC+09:00 (JST)
- City hall address: 1650 Ōji-Aiai, Bungotakada-shi, Ōita-ken 878-8555
- Climate: Cfa
- Website: Official website
- Symbols
- Flower: Cosmos
- Tree: Diospyros kaki

Bungotakada (豊後高田市, Bungotakada-shi) is a city located in Ōita Prefecture, Kyushu, Japan. As of 30 November 2023, the city had an estimated population of 21,980 in 11038 households, and a population density of 96 persons per km². The total area of the city is 206.24 km^{2} (79.63 sq mi).

== Geography ==
Bungotakada is located in the western part of the Kunisaki Peninsula in northern Ōita Prefecture, facing the Gulf of Suō at the edge of the Seto Inland Sea. The city center is located in the Takada area, which stretches across the plains along the Katsura River (桂川, Katsura-gawa) and was once a prosperous shipping and commercial town.

It is located approximately 30 minutes by car from Nakatsu City and approximately one hour by car from the prefectural capital, Ōita City.

In the Tamatsu district in the north of the city center, there is a hilly area which is the site of the former Takada Castle. Its jōkamachi castle town was developed from the Edo period onwards.

Moving in the direction of the central Kunisaki Peninsula from the city center, many mountain valleys can be seen. These numerous valley radiate from Mount Futago (両子山, Futago-san), an inactive volcano located at the center of the peninsula. Among these valleys is Ebisu Valley (夷谷, Ebisudani). The valley contains the rocky trekking course Nakayama Senkyo (中山仙境) which was designated as a "Place of Scenic Beauty" by the Japanese government in 2018.

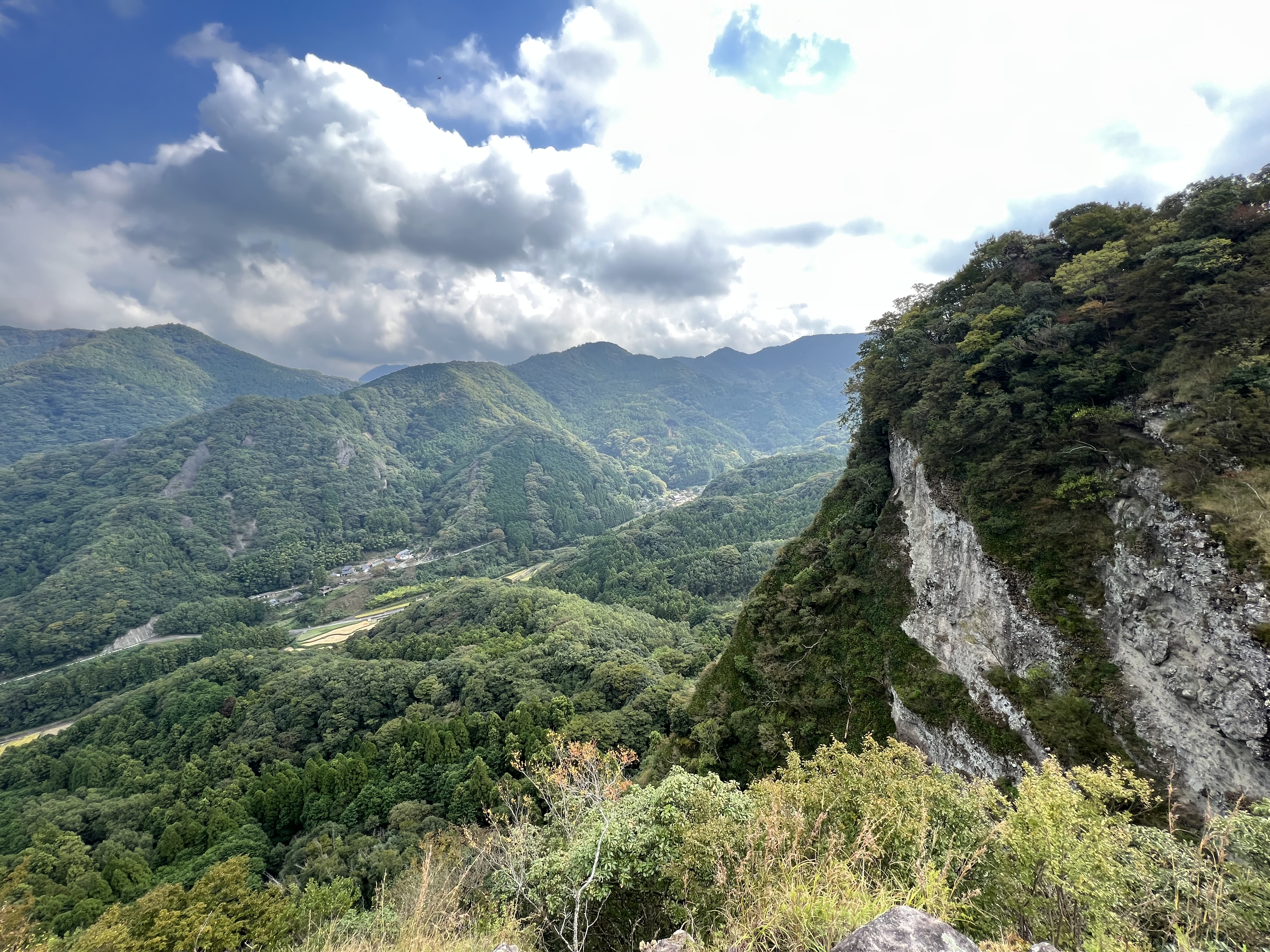
Ebisu Valley as seen from the Nakayama Senkyo trekking course

=== Neighboring municipalities ===
Ōita Prefecture

- Kitsuki
- Kunisaki
- Usa

=== Climate ===
Bungotakada has a humid subtropical climate (Köppen climate classification Cfa) with hot summers and cool winters. Precipitation is significant throughout the year, but is somewhat lower in winter. The average annual temperature in Bungotakada is 15.9 °C (60.6 °F). The average annual rainfall is 1,992.2 mm (78.43 in) with June as the wettest month. The temperatures are highest on average in August, at around 24.5 °C (76.1 °F), and lowest in January, at around 2.3 °C (36.1 °F). The highest temperature ever recorded in Bungotakada was 38.9 °C (102.0 °F) on 3 August 2026; the coldest temperature ever recorded was −6.9 °C (19.6 °F) on 3 February 2012.

Climate data for Bungotakada (1991−2020 normals, extremes 1977−present)
Month	Jan	Feb	Mar	Apr	May	Jun	Jul	Aug	Sep	Oct	Nov	Dec	Year
Record high °C (°F)	19.6 (67.3)	24.5 (76.1)	27.2 (81.0)	29.7 (85.5)	32.8 (91.0)	35.6 (96.1)	37.9 (100.2)	38.9 (102.0)	35.9 (96.6)	32.4 (90.3)	27.9 (82.2)	26.3 (79.3)	38.9 (102.0)
Mean daily maximum °C (°F)	9.3 (48.7)	10.3 (50.5)	13.8 (56.8)	19.1 (66.4)	23.8 (74.8)	26.8 (80.2)	30.8 (87.4)	32.0 (89.6)	28.0 (82.4)	22.9 (73.2)	17.4 (63.3)	11.8 (53.2)	20.5 (68.9)
Daily mean °C (°F)	5.3 (41.5)	6.0 (42.8)	9.1 (48.4)	13.9 (57.0)	18.6 (65.5)	22.3 (72.1)	26.3 (79.3)	27.3 (81.1)	23.6 (74.5)	18.2 (64.8)	12.8 (55.0)	7.6 (45.7)	15.9 (60.6)
Mean daily minimum °C (°F)	1.1 (34.0)	1.6 (34.9)	4.2 (39.6)	8.7 (47.7)	13.7 (56.7)	18.7 (65.7)	22.9 (73.2)	23.6 (74.5)	19.9 (67.8)	13.8 (56.8)	8.2 (46.8)	3.2 (37.8)	11.6 (53.0)
Record low °C (°F)	−5.5 (22.1)	−6.9 (19.6)	−4.6 (23.7)	−0.5 (31.1)	4.4 (39.9)	10.0 (50.0)	15.2 (59.4)	17.1 (62.8)	8.2 (46.8)	3.1 (37.6)	−0.7 (30.7)	−4.2 (24.4)	−6.9 (19.6)
Average precipitation mm (inches)	47.8 (1.88)	61.9 (2.44)	93.3 (3.67)	103.8 (4.09)	119.2 (4.69)	260.8 (10.27)	251.4 (9.90)	132.7 (5.22)	169.3 (6.67)	94.6 (3.72)	63.8 (2.51)	49.3 (1.94)	1,457.4 (57.38)
Average precipitation days (≥ 1.0 mm)	6.6	8.0	9.9	9.8	8.9	13.0	11.2	8.9	9.8	6.4	7.7	6.8	107
Mean monthly sunshine hours	138.7	143.8	177.9	201.2	212.9	149.4	194.9	225.0	166.9	175.0	147.1	132.8	2,059.6
Source: Japan Meteorological Agency

=== Demographics ===
Per Japanese census data, the population of Bungotakada in 2020 is 22,112 people. Bungotakada has been conducting censuses since 1950.

Historical population
Year	Pop.	±%
1950	49,214	—
1955	47,324	−3.8%
1960	43,381	−8.3%
1965	37,811	−12.8%
1970	33,561	−11.2%
1975	31,527	−6.1%
1980	30,705	−2.6%
1985	29,812	−2.9%
1990	28,798	−3.4%
1995	27,337	−5.1%
2000	26,206	−4.1%
2005	25,114	−4.2%
2010	23,918	−4.8%
2015	22,853	−4.5%
2020	22,112	−3.2%
Bungotakada population statistics

== History ==
The area of Bungotakada was part of ancient Bungo Province, although some portions were part of ancient Buzen Province. From the Nara period and Heian period, numerous Buddhist temples were constructed in the mountains of the Kunisaki Peninsula which became known as Rokugō Manzan (六郷満山). Many of these Rokugō Manzan temples, which are said to be the origin of the syncretism of Buddhism and Shinto in Japan, are located within the borders of Bungotakada.

During the Edo period it was mostly under control of Shimabara Domain and was ruled by a cadet branch of the Matsudaira clan, with smaller areas under control of Nobeoka Domain. After the Meiji restoration, the town of Takada within Nishikunisaki District, Ōita was established on May 1, 1889 with the creation of the modern municipalities system. It changed its name to Bungotakada on May 10, 1954 and on May 31 of the same year was raised to city status.

On March 31, 2005, the towns of Kakaji and Matama (both from Nishikunisaki District) were merged into Bungotakada.

== Government ==
Bungotakada has a mayor-council form of government with a directly elected mayor and a unicameral city council of 16 members. Bungotakada contributes one member to the Ōita Prefectural Assembly. In terms of national politics, the city is part of the Ōita 3rd district of the lower house of the Diet of Japan.

== Economy ==
The economy of Bungotakada is based primarily on agriculture, with the area being a top producer of negi, buckwheat, peanuts, and Alkekengi in Western Japan.

== Education ==
Bungotakada has ten public elementary schools, five public junior high schools and one combined elementary/junior high school operated by the city government. There is one public high school operated by the Ōita Prefectural Board of Education (大分県教育委員会).

== Transportation ==
=== Railways ===
Bungotakada has no passenger railway service. The nearest station is Usa Station on the JR Kyushu Nippō Main Line, which is approximately four kilometers away from the Bungotakada urban center.

The former Usa Sangū Line (大分交通宇佐参宮線) once connected Bungotakada to a former railway station at Usa Jingū. The line was closed in 1965.

=== Highways ===
- National Route 213

=== Airports ===
The nearest airport is Oita Airport located in Kunisaki.

== Festivals and events ==
- Horan-enya [jp], a January naked festival in which men in funodshi throw mochi to spectators from a fishing boat and occasionally dive into the cold Katsura River.
- Shujo Onie Festival [jp] (Tennenji Temple [jp]), a fire festival involving oni held during the Lunar New Year.
- Wakamiya Hachiman Shrine Fall Festival [jp], a naked festival in November. A large torch is lit with fire arrows before men donning fundoshi carry a mikoshi across the Katsura River [jp].
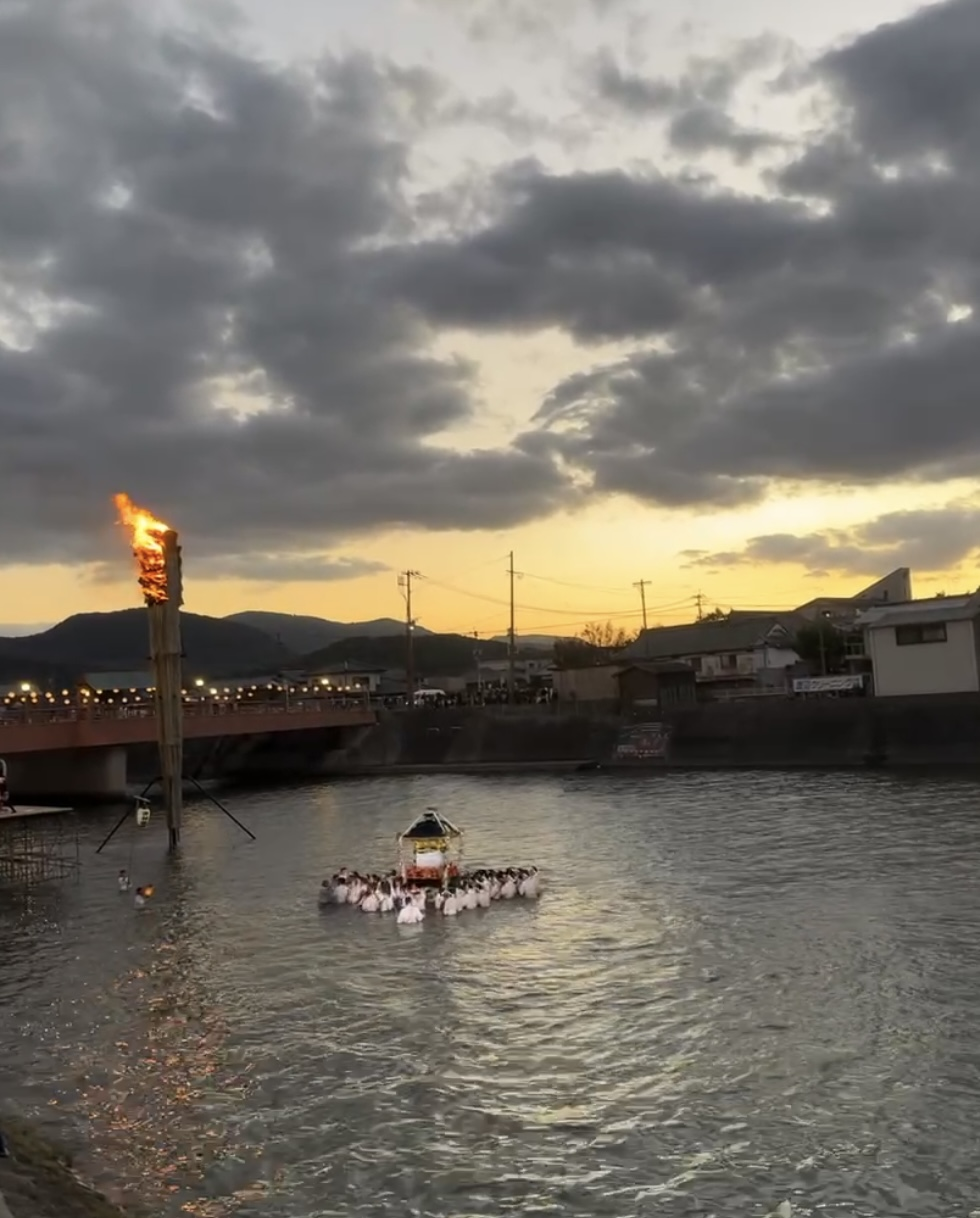
Men carrying mikoshi across the Katsura River while the large torch burns

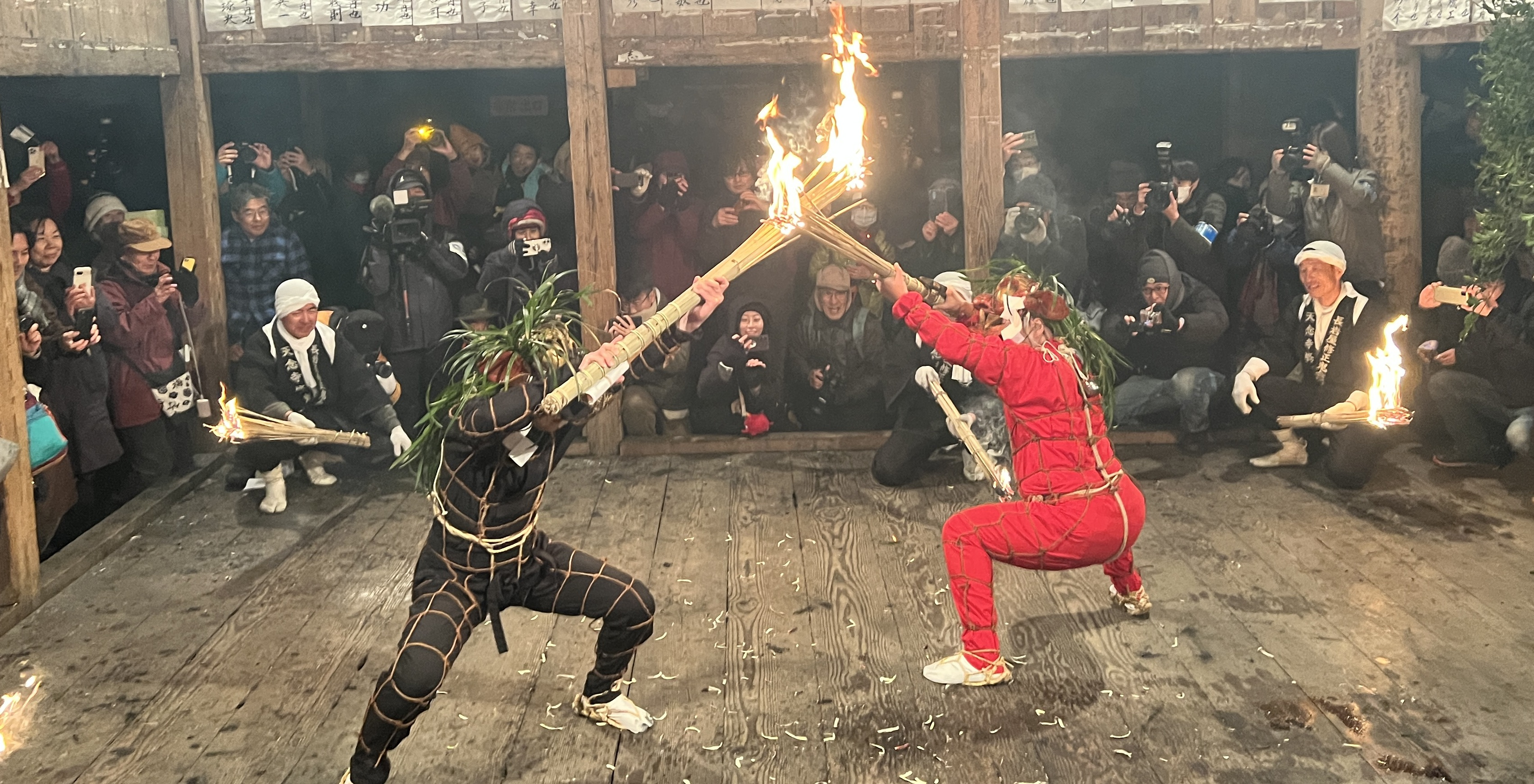
Shujo Onie Festival

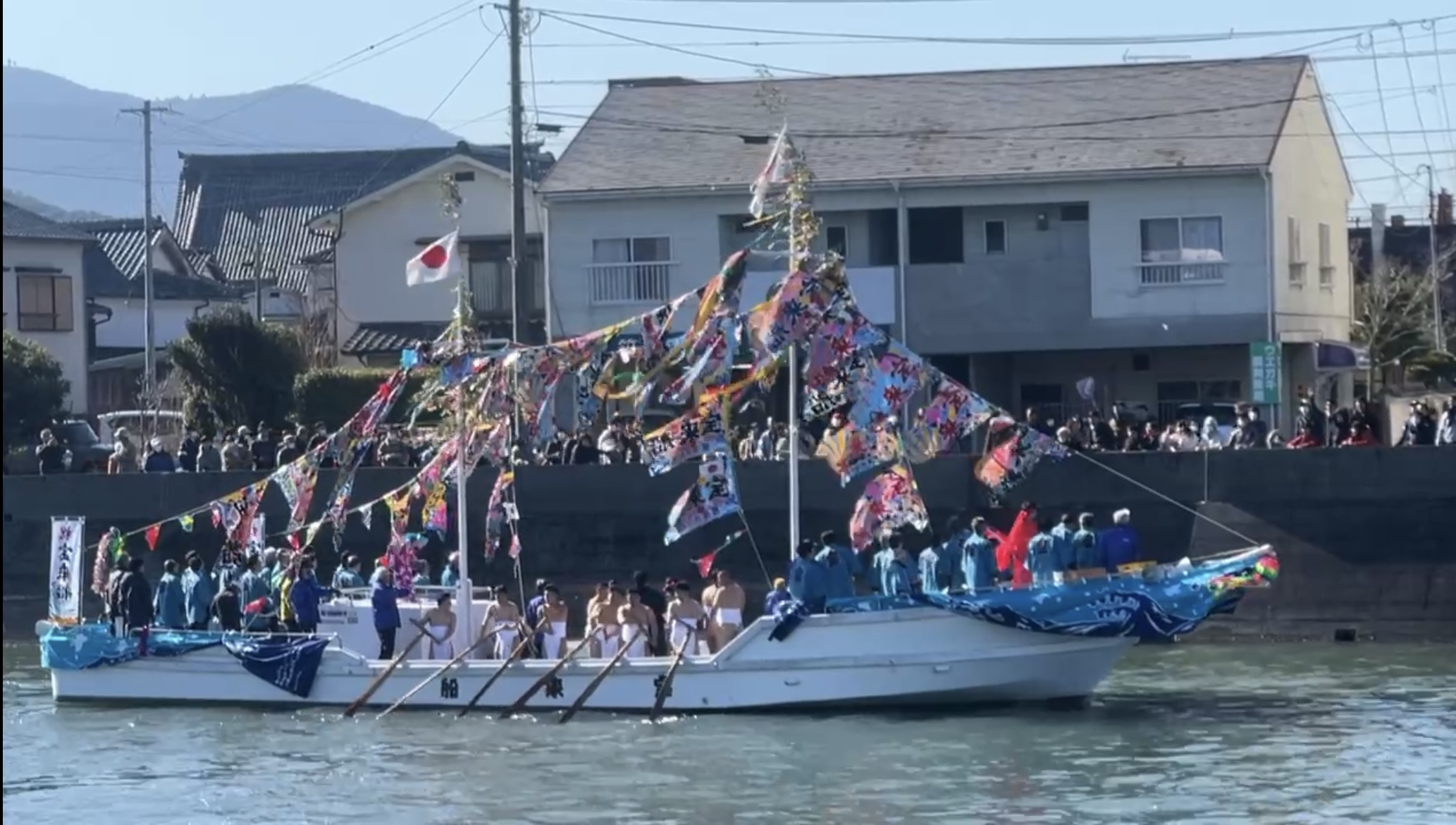
Boat carrying men in fundoshi during Horan-enya

== Local attractions ==
- Fuki-ji, Buddhist temple established in 718 AD with National Treasure Main Hall
- Kumano Magaibutsu, National Historic Site
- Maki Ōdō, historic temple containing Heian-period statues
- Matama Coast [jp], famous for its beautiful sunsets and tidal flats
- Nagasakibana [jp], a cape with a campground and flower park with seasonal flowers such as nanohana, sunflowers, cherry blossoms, and cosmos. There are also sea caves, a beach for sea bathing, and an art museum called "Art Museum of Nature and Human Non-Homogeneity" (不均質な自然と人の美術館). Nagasakibana is sometimes called the "cape of flowers and art."
- Showa no Machi, town popular for its nostalgic streets reminiscent of the Shōwa Period
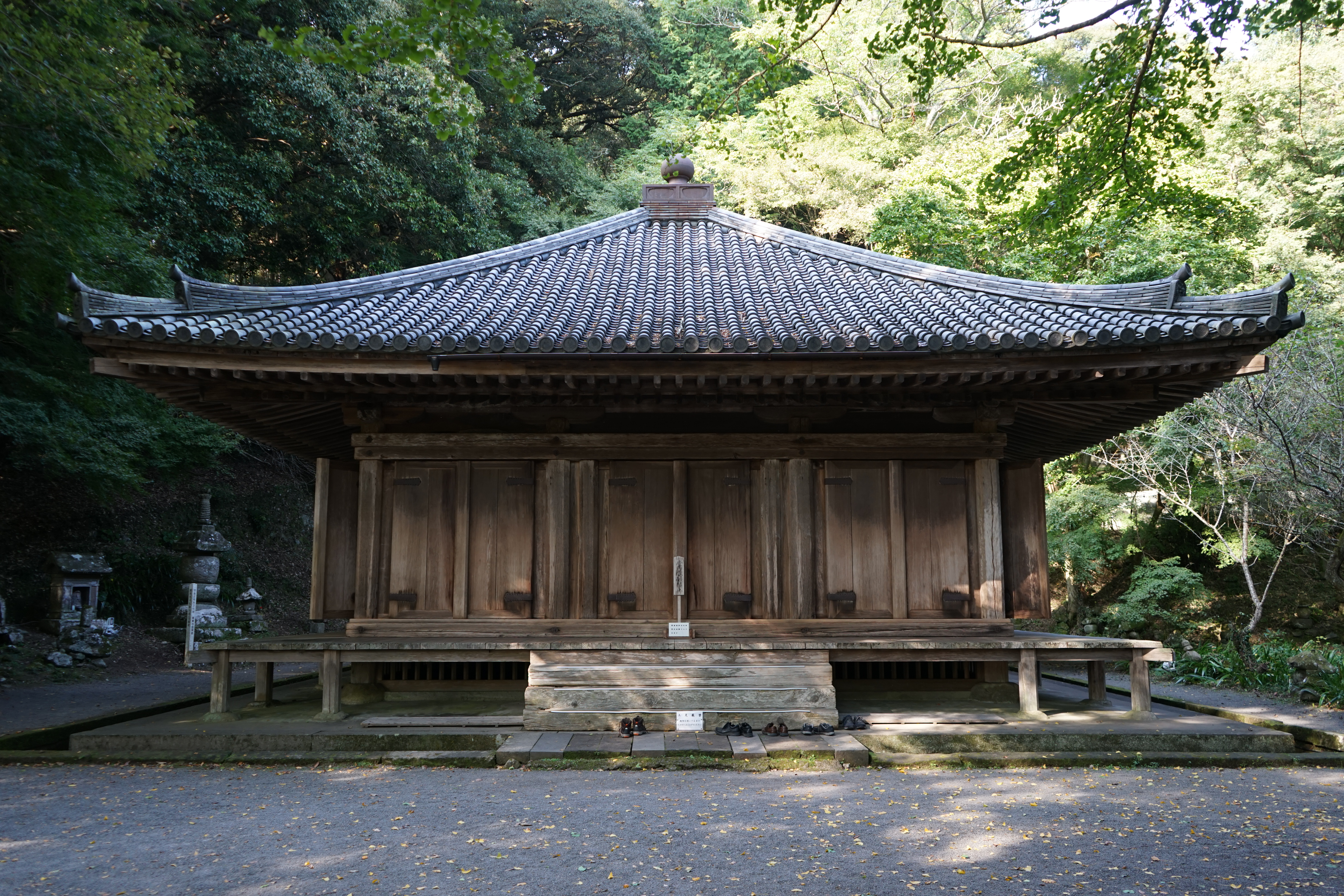
Main hall of Fuki-ji

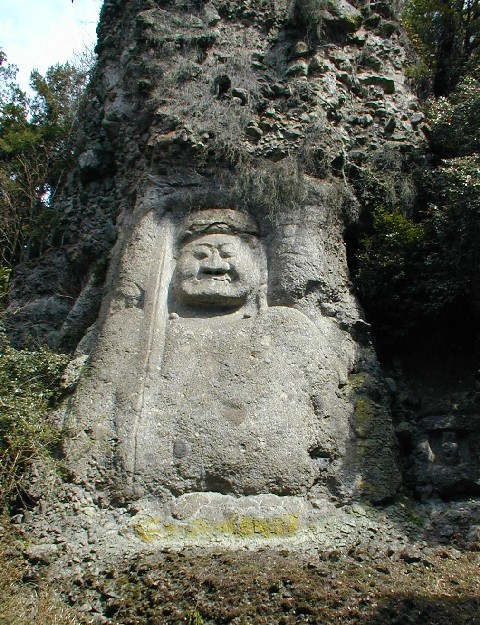
Fudō-Myoō (不動明王) Statue in Kumano Magaibutsu (熊野磨崖仏)

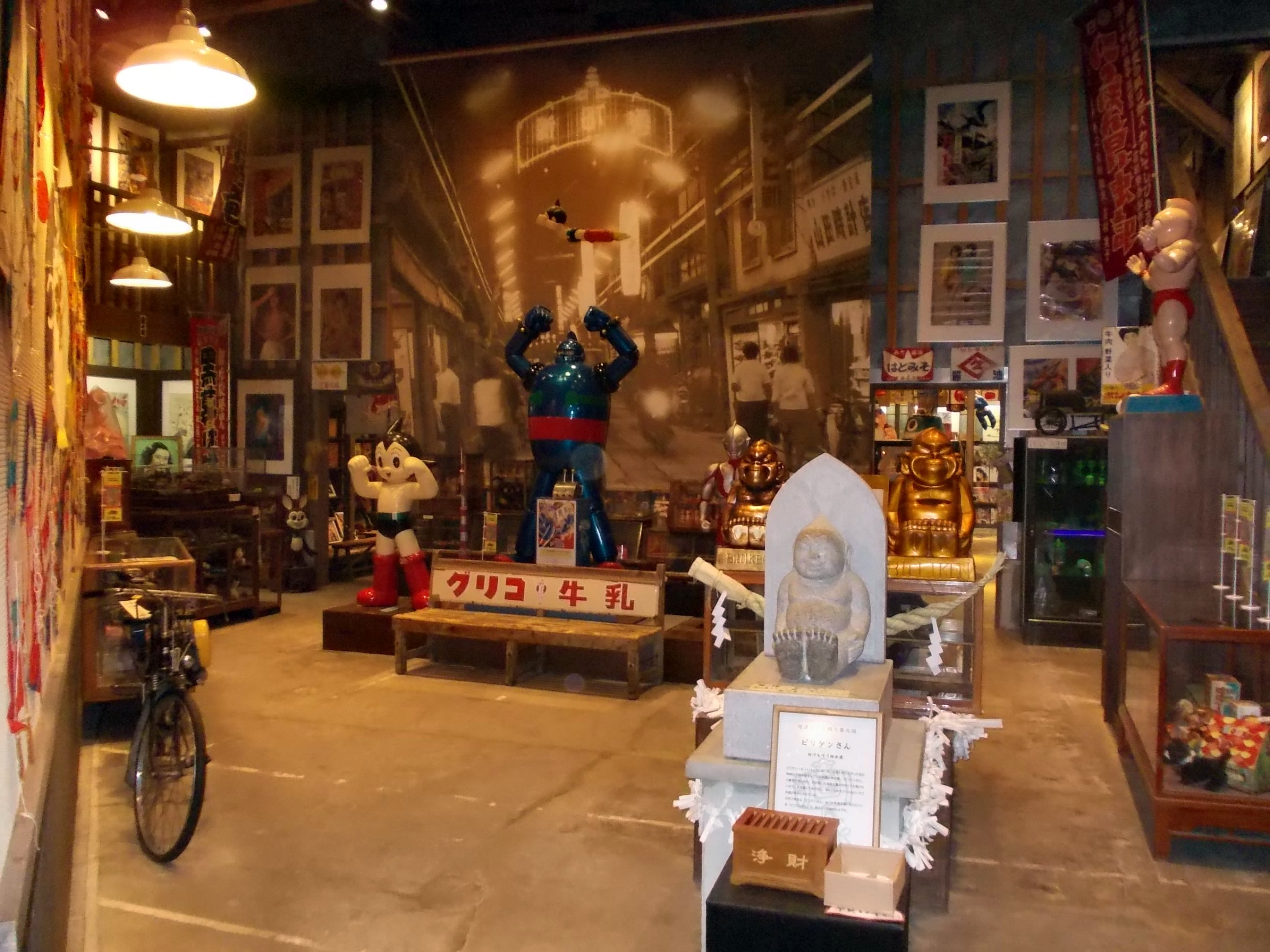
Shōwa-Style visitor attraction in Shōwa-no-Machi

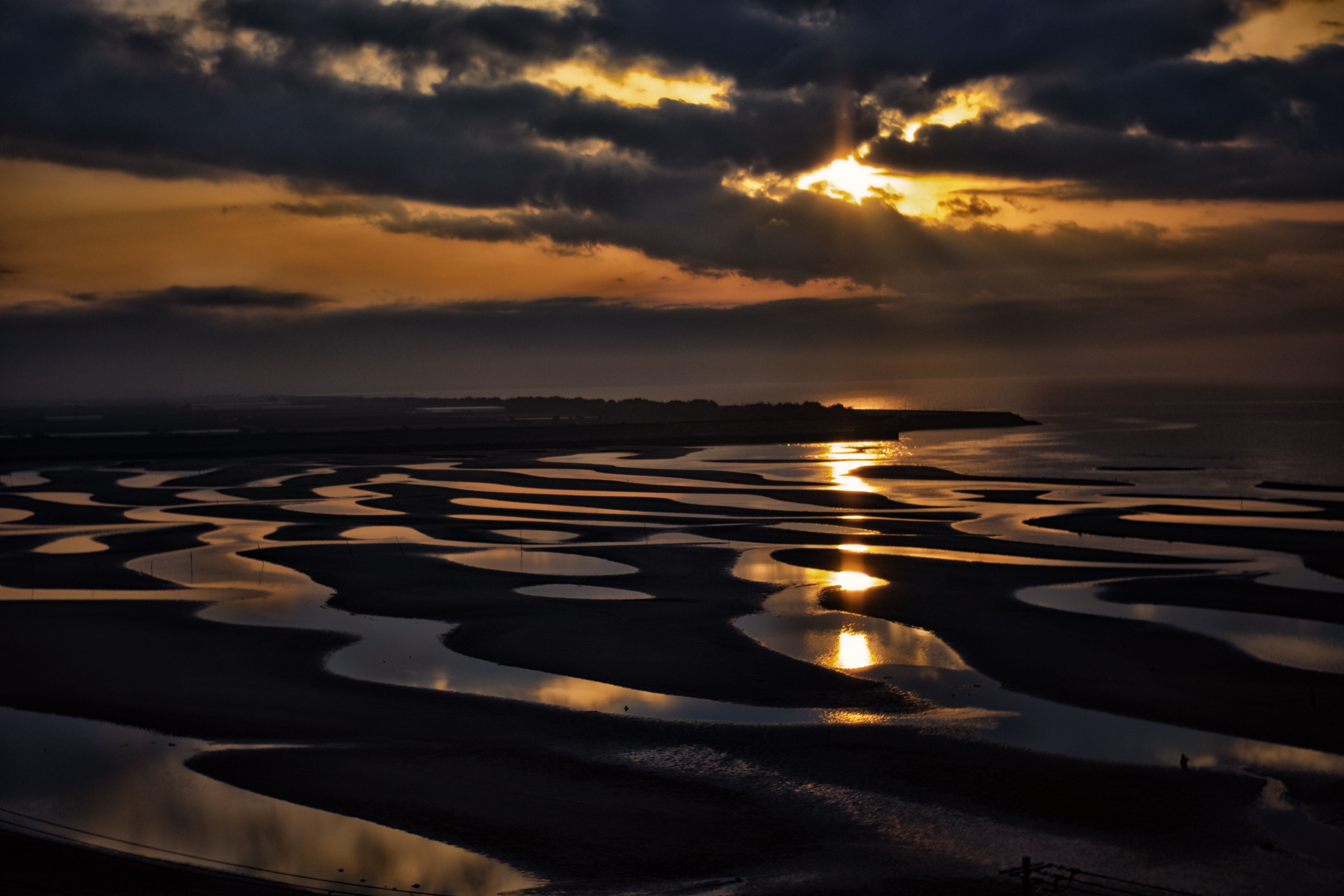
Dusk at the Matama Coast tidal flats

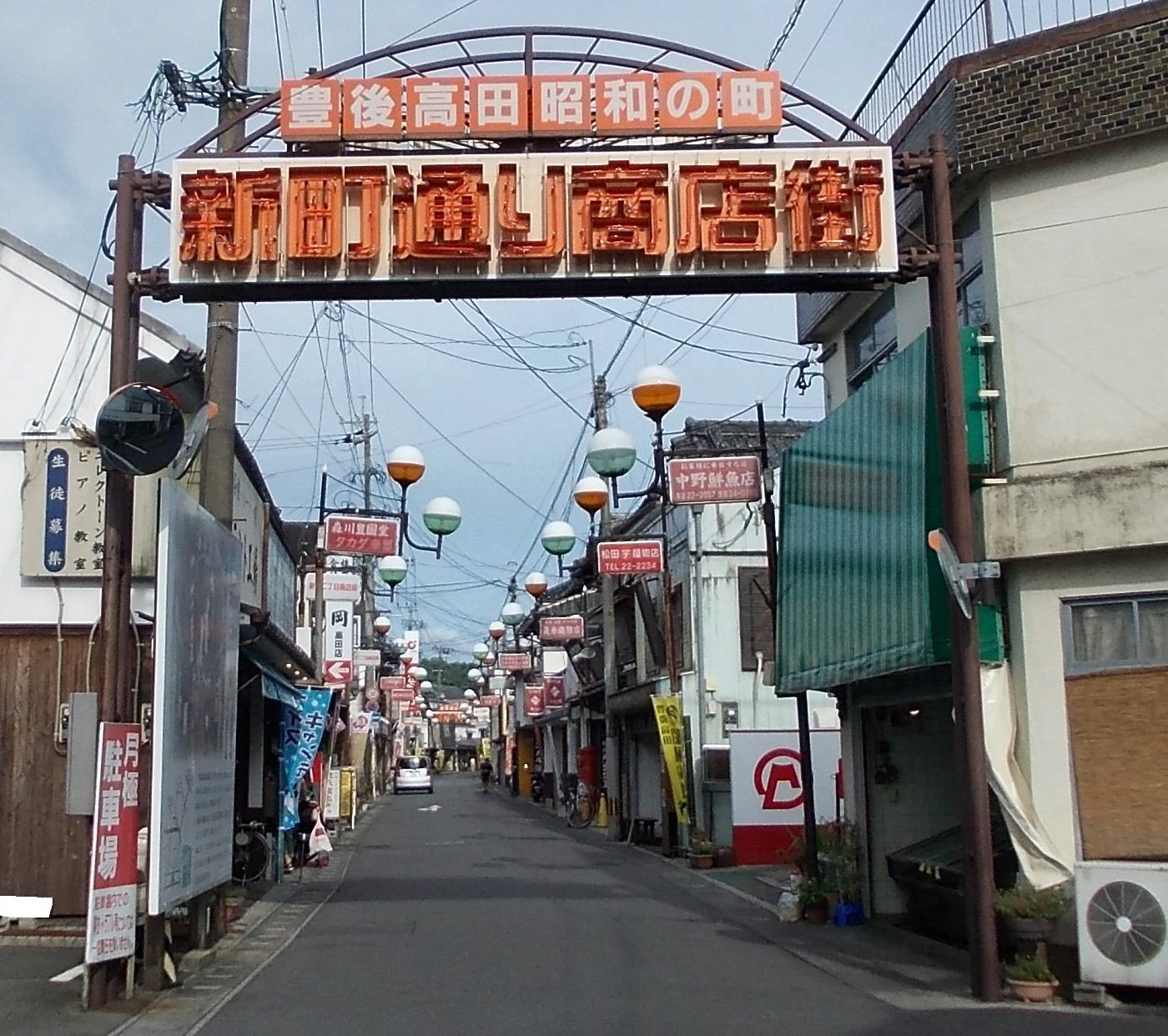
Sign marking the entrance to the Shōwa-no-Machi shopping street

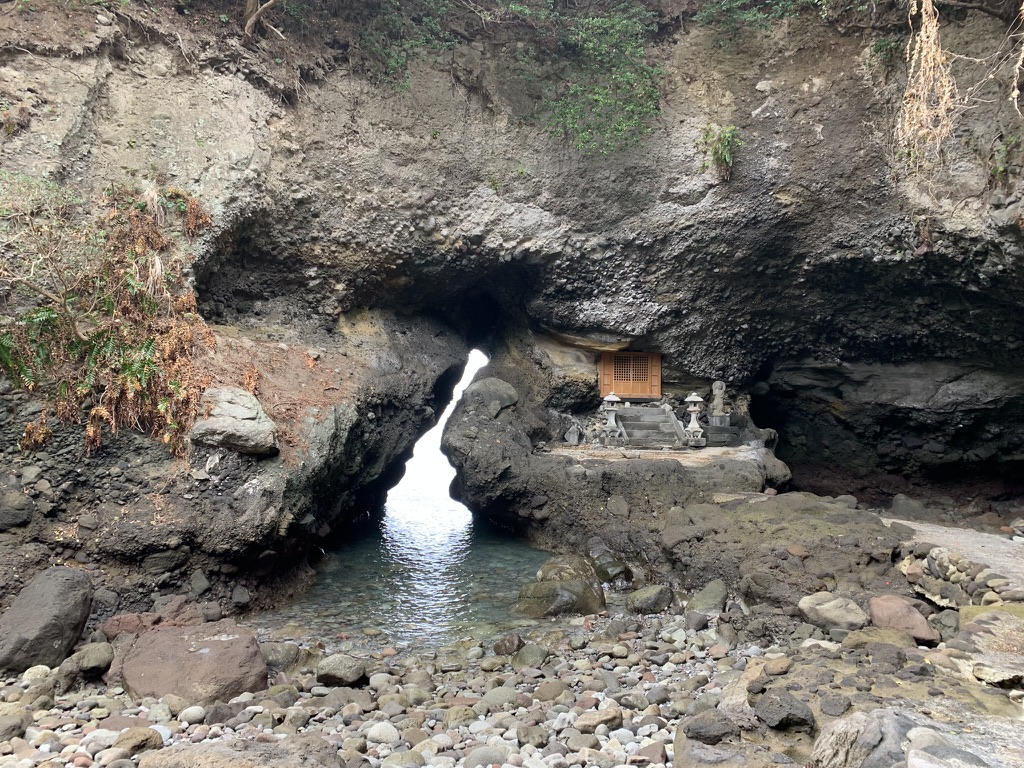
Gyōja Cave, a sea cave at Nagasakibana
