= Innai, Ōita =

Dissolved municipality in Ōita prefecture, Japan

Innai (院内町, Innai-machi) was a town located in Usa District, Ōita Prefecture, Japan.

As of 2003, the town had an estimated population of 4,860 and the density of 42.77 persons per km^{2}. The total area was 113.62 km^{2}.

On March 31, 2005, Innai, along with the town of Ajimu (also from Usa District), was merged into the expanded city of Usa.
