= Yamaga, Ōita =

Town

Yamaga (山香町, Yamaga-machi) was a town located in Hayami District, Ōita Prefecture, Japan.

As of 2003, the town had an estimated population of 8,590 and the density of 59.77 persons per km^{2}. The total area was 143.71 km^{2}.

On October 1, 2005, Yamaga, along with the village of Ōta (from Nishikunisaki District), was merged into the expanded city of Kitsuki.
