= Matama, Ōita =

Dissolved municipality in Ōita prefecture, Japan

Matama (真玉町, Matama-machi) was a town located in Nishikunisaki District, Ōita Prefecture, Japan.

== Population ==
As of 2003, the town had an estimated population of 3,808 and the density of 85.80 persons per km^{2}. The total area was 44.38 km^{2}.

== Merge ==
On March 31, 2005, Matama, along with the town of Kakaji (also from Nishikunisaki District), was merged into the expanded city of Bungotakada.

== Location ==
Matama town is located on the northern coast of Kyushu.
