= Ajimu, Ōita =

Dissolved municipality in Ōita prefecture, Japan

Ajimu (安心院町, Ajimu-machi) was a town located in Usa District, Ōita Prefecture, Japan. It used to use its farmers' rural houses for tourism. The Kyushu Natural Zoological Park was located in this town.

As of 2003, the town had an estimated population of 7,879 and the density of 53.54 persons per km^{2}. The total area was 147.17 km^{2}.

On March 31, 2005, Ajimu, along with the town of Innai (also from Usa District), was merged into the expanded city of Usa.
