= Ōta, Ōita =

Village in Nishikunisaki District, Ōita Prefecture, Japan

Ōta (大田村, Ōta-mura) was a village located in Nishikunisaki District, Ōita Prefecture, Japan.

As of 2003, the village had an estimated population of 1,829 and the density of 39.70 persons per km^{2}. The total area was 46.07 km^{2}.

On October 1, 2005, Ōta, along with the town of Yamaga (from Hayami District), was merged into the expanded city of Kitsuki.
