= Usa, Ōita =

Usa 宇佐市
- City
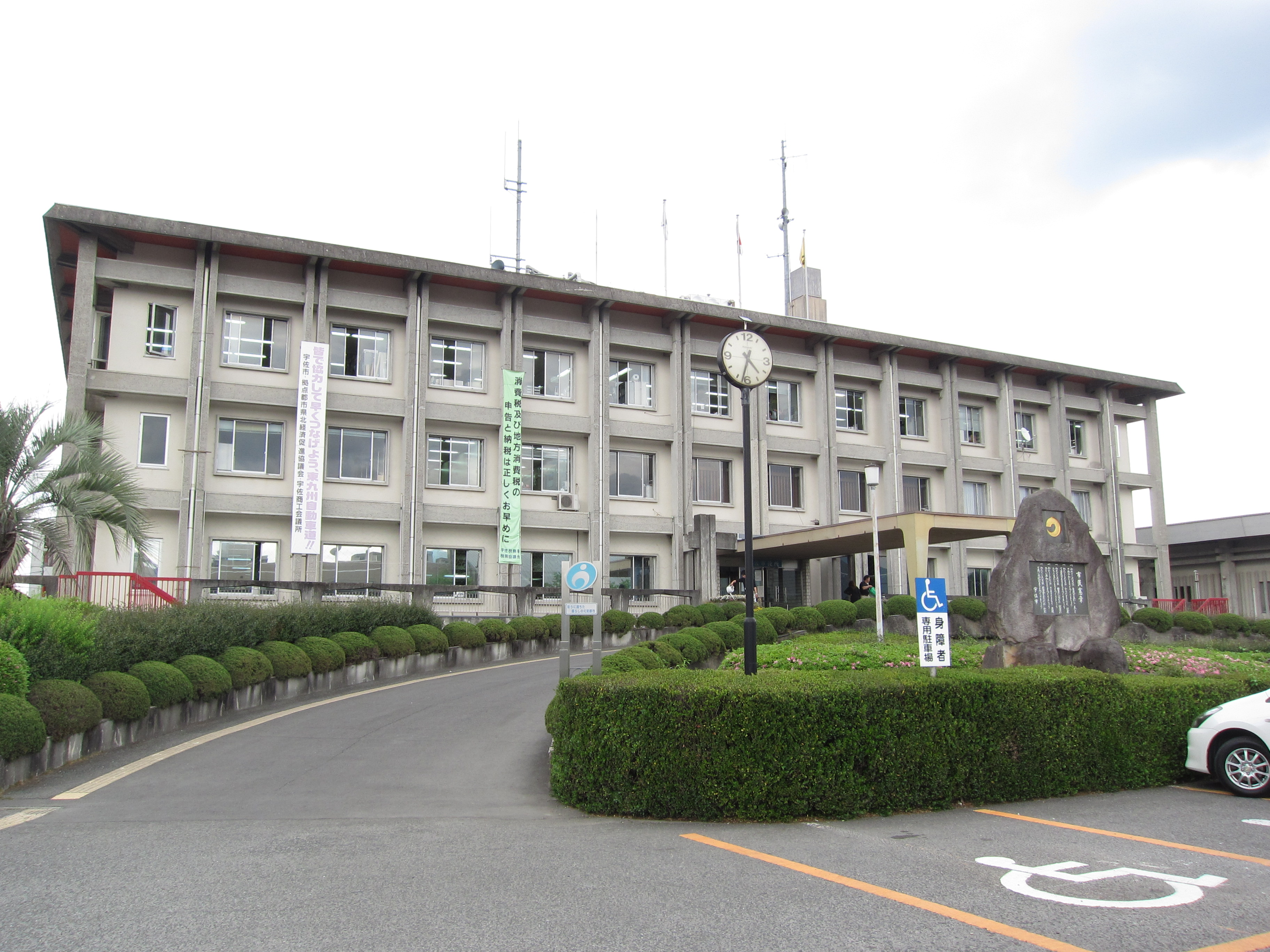
- Usa City Hall

- Flag Seal
- Location of Usa in Ōita Prefecture

- Coordinates: 33°31′55″N 131°20′58″E
- Country: Japan
- Region: Kyushu
- Prefecture: Ōita

Government
  - Mayor: Shuji Korenaga

Area
  - Total: 439.05 km^{2} (169.52 sq mi)

Population (November 30, 2023)
  - Total: 52,808
  - Density: 120.28/km^{2} (311.52/sq mi)
- Time zone: UTC+9 (Japan Standard Time)
- Phone number: 0978-32-1111
- Address: 1-1030 Ōaza-Ueda, Usa-shi, Ōita-ken 879-0492
- Climate: Cfa
- Website: Official website
- Symbols
- Flower: Rhododendron
- Tree: Quercus gilva

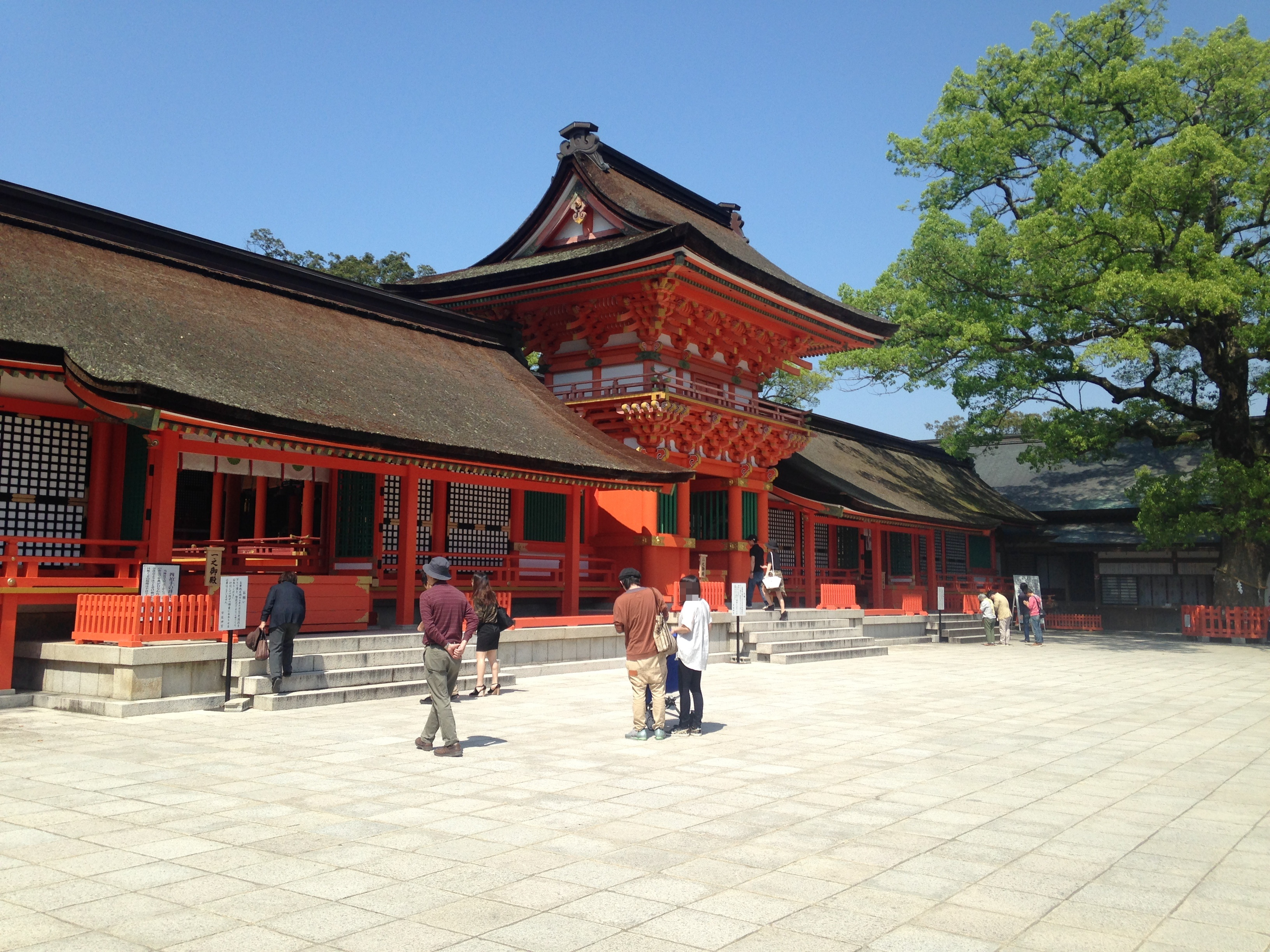
Chokushimon Gate in Upper Shrine of Usa Jingū

Usa (宇佐市, Usa-shi; Japanese pronunciation: [ɯ̈́.sä̀, ɯ̈̀.sä́.ɕì]) is a city located in Ōita Prefecture, Japan. As of 30 November 2023, the city had an estimated population of 52,808 in 26026 households, and a population density of 120 persons per km^{2}. The total area of the city is 439.05 km^{2} (169.52 sq mi). It is notable for Usa Jingū, the head shrine of all 40,000 Hachiman shrines across Japan.

== Geography ==
Usa is located on the northern base of the Kunisaki Peninsula and faces the Gulf of Suō to the north, Nakatsu City to the west, Kusu Town and Yufu City to the south, and Kitsuki City and Bungotakada City to the east.

Three districts have traditionally been economic and cultural centers: the Usa district (particularly Minami-Usa), which developed as the shrine town associated with Usa Jingū (also known as the Usa Shrine), the Yokkaichi district, which developed as the temple town of Hongan-ji Temple and administrative center, and the Nagasu district, which developed as a port town.

=== Neighboring municipalities ===
Ōita Prefecture

- Beppu
- Bungo-Takada
- Hiji
- Kitsuki
- Kusu
- Nakatsu
- Yufu

=== Climate ===
Usa has a humid subtropical climate (Köppen climate classification Cfa) with hot summers and cool winters. Precipitation is significant throughout the year, but is somewhat lower in winter. The average annual temperature in Usa is 14.9 °C (58.8 °F). The average annual rainfall is 1,729.1 mm (68.07 in) with July as the wettest month. The temperatures are highest on average in August, at around 26.4 °C (79.5 °F), and lowest in January, at around 4.0 °C (39.2 °F). The highest temperature ever recorded in Usa was 37.8 °C (100.0 °F) on 31 July 2015; the coldest temperature ever recorded was −9.0 °C (15.8 °F) on 26 February 1981.

Climate data for Innai, Usa (1991−2020 normals, extremes 1977−present)
Month	Jan	Feb	Mar	Apr	May	Jun	Jul	Aug	Sep	Oct	Nov	Dec	Year
Record high °C (°F)	21.8 (71.2)	26.1 (79.0)	27.5 (81.5)	31.4 (88.5)	33.0 (91.4)	35.5 (95.9)	37.8 (100.0)	37.6 (99.7)	35.1 (95.2)	30.9 (87.6)	28.4 (83.1)	24.5 (76.1)	37.8 (100.0)
Mean daily maximum °C (°F)	9.4 (48.9)	10.5 (50.9)	14.2 (57.6)	19.8 (67.6)	24.5 (76.1)	26.8 (80.2)	30.9 (87.6)	31.7 (89.1)	27.6 (81.7)	22.6 (72.7)	17.2 (63.0)	11.7 (53.1)	20.6 (69.0)
Daily mean °C (°F)	4.0 (39.2)	4.9 (40.8)	8.3 (46.9)	13.4 (56.1)	18.2 (64.8)	21.8 (71.2)	25.8 (78.4)	26.4 (79.5)	22.5 (72.5)	16.7 (62.1)	11.0 (51.8)	5.9 (42.6)	14.9 (58.8)
Mean daily minimum °C (°F)	−0.7 (30.7)	−0.4 (31.3)	2.5 (36.5)	7.1 (44.8)	12.4 (54.3)	17.6 (63.7)	21.9 (71.4)	22.3 (72.1)	18.5 (65.3)	11.7 (53.1)	5.7 (42.3)	0.9 (33.6)	10.0 (49.9)
Record low °C (°F)	−8.3 (17.1)	−9.0 (15.8)	−8.6 (16.5)	−3.2 (26.2)	0.7 (33.3)	6.2 (43.2)	12.4 (54.3)	15.0 (59.0)	5.6 (42.1)	−0.6 (30.9)	−3.8 (25.2)	−7.5 (18.5)	−9.0 (15.8)
Average precipitation mm (inches)	59.5 (2.34)	70.7 (2.78)	106.2 (4.18)	114.7 (4.52)	130.5 (5.14)	302.4 (11.91)	307.2 (12.09)	178.5 (7.03)	220.7 (8.69)	115.8 (4.56)	69.0 (2.72)	53.9 (2.12)	1,729.1 (68.07)
Average precipitation days (≥ 1.0 mm)	8.4	8.7	11.2	9.9	9.3	13.7	12.6	10.1	10.8	7.5	8.0	7.6	117.8
Mean monthly sunshine hours	127.5	130.2	159.0	181.7	191.4	127.8	162.7	187.8	141.9	161.1	141.7	129.0	1,841.8
Source: Japan Meteorological Agency

=== Demographics ===
Per Japanese census data, the population of Usa in 2020 is 52,771 people. Usa has been conducting censuses since 1950.

Historical population
Year	Pop.	±%
1950	98,429	—
1955	95,317	−3.2%
1960	87,460	−8.2%
1965	77,025	−11.9%
1970	71,020	−7.8%
1975	67,777	−4.6%
1980	67,811	+0.1%
1985	67,960	+0.2%
1990	65,541	−3.6%
1995	63,819	−2.6%
2000	62,349	−2.3%
2005	60,809	−2.5%
2010	59,015	−3.0%
2015	56,258	−4.7%
2020	52,771	−6.2%
Usa population statistics

== History ==
The area of Usa was the southeastern tip of the former Buzen Province and on the border with the former Bungo Province. The name "Usa" appears in the Kojiki and Nihon Shoki and Emperor Jimmu visited Usa prior to departing to the east for his conquest of Yamato. Due to the economic and political power of Usa Jingū, no samurai clan was able to dominate the area until the Sengoku period during which time it became a battleground between the Ōuchi clan and Ōtomo clan and later the Shimazu clan. Under Toyotomi Hideyoshi, Buzen province became the territory of Kuroda Yoshitaka, who constructed Nakatsu Castle. During the Edo period it was mostly tenryō administered directly by the Tokugawa shogunate, with smaller areas under control of Nakatsu Domain, Shimabara Domain and Usa Jingū. After the Meiji restoration, the town of Usa within Usa District, Ōita was established on May 1, 1889 with the creation of the modern municipalities system. On April 1, 1955 Kitsuki merged with the villages of Yasaka, Kita-Kitsuki and, Nakarie and was raised to city status. On October 1, 2005 Kitsuki merged with the town of Yamaka from Hayami District and the village of Ota from Nishikunisaki District, Ōita. On April 1, 1967 Usa merged with the towns of Ekigawa, Yokkaichi, and Nagasu to form the city of Usa. On March 31, 2005, the towns of Ajimu and Innai (both from Usa District) were merged into Usa.

During World War II, the Usa Naval Air Group (宇佐海軍航空隊, Usa Kaigun Koukūtai) was stationed at an airbase in Usa. Towards the end of the war, the airbase was used to launch kamikaze attacks against American forces. It was subject to B-29 air raids in 1945 which led to the destruction of many of the airfield's facilities and caused the deaths of many soldiers and civilians. Many remnants of the former airfield are still visible. For example, there are several concrete bunkers which once held A6M Zero fighter aircraft. There is also a crater called the "bomb pond" which was caused by a bomb from an American B-29 bomber.

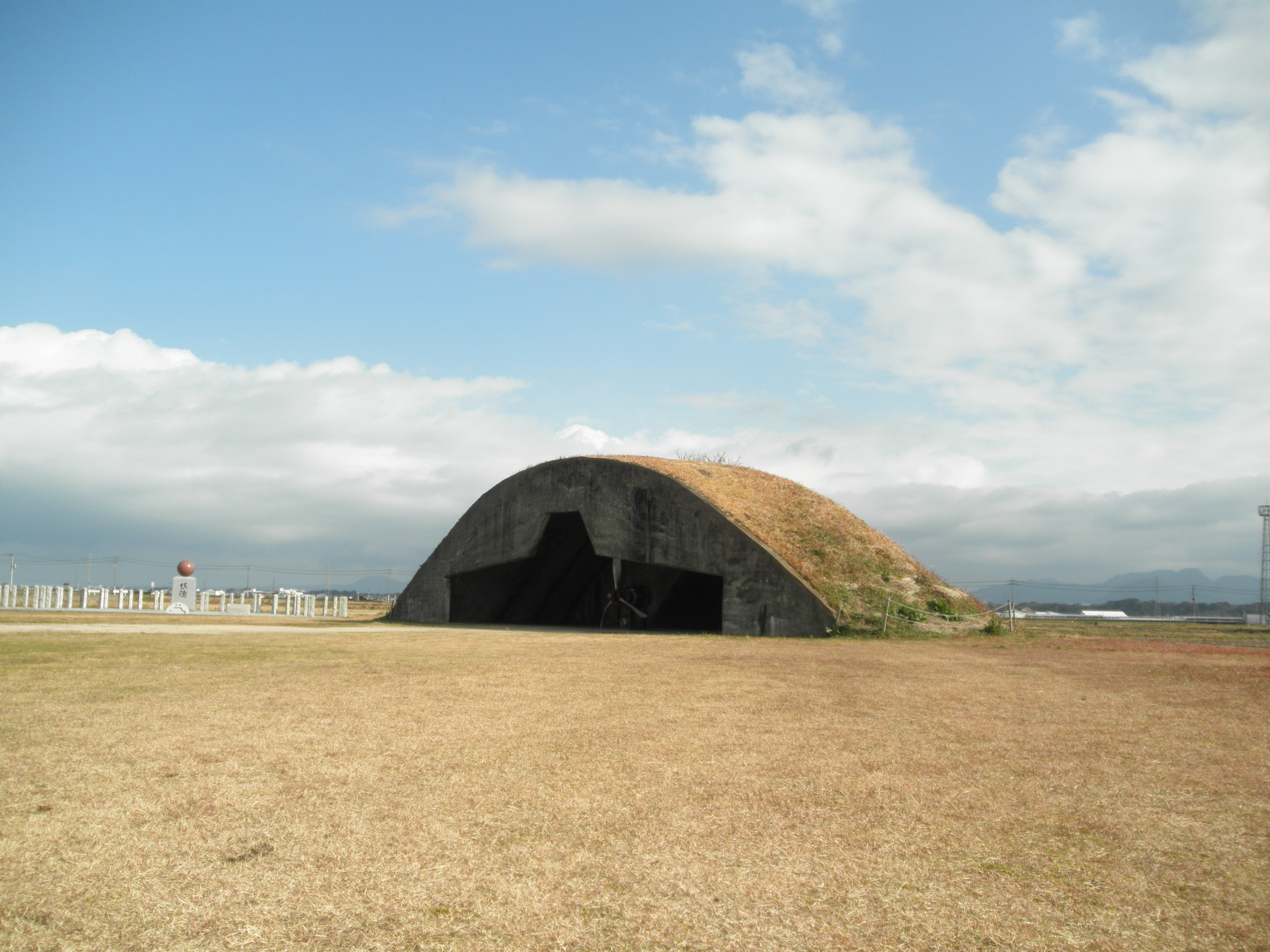
A6M Zero bunker at the former Usa airbase

== Government ==
Usa has a mayor-council form of government with a directly elected mayor and a unicameral city council of 21 members. Usa contributes three members to the Ōita Prefectural Assembly. In terms of national politics, the city is part of the Ōita 3rd district of the lower house of the Diet of Japan.

== Economy ==
The economy of Usa remains largely agricultural. It has close economic ties with neighboring Nakatsu, and belongs to the urban employment area (10% commuting area) of the Nakatsu metropolitan area.

== Education ==
Usa has 24 public elementary schools and seven public junior high schools operated by the city government and three public high schools operated by the Ōita Prefectural Board of Education. The city also has one private high school.

== Transportation ==
=== Railways ===
JR Kyushu - Nippō Main Line

- Amatsu - Buzen-Zenkōji - Yanagigaura - Buzen-Nagasu - Usa - Nishiyashiki

=== Highways ===
- Higashikyushu Expressway
- National Route 10
- National Route 213
- National Route 387
- National Route 500

== Local attractions ==
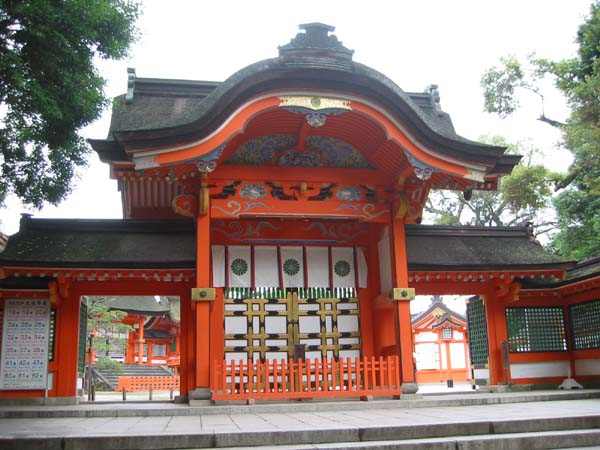
West gate of Usa Shrine

- Futaba no Sato, a museum dedicated to sumo wrestler Futabayama Sadaji, is located in the city. There is a statue outside the museum, built by the government in 1999, depicting the names and hand prints of three sumo wrestlers who have won more than 60 competitive bouts. In addition to Futubayama, Tanikaze Kajinosuke and Hakuhō Shō are represented on the statue.
- Kyushu Natural Animal Park African Safari, a large safari park, is located in Ajimu.
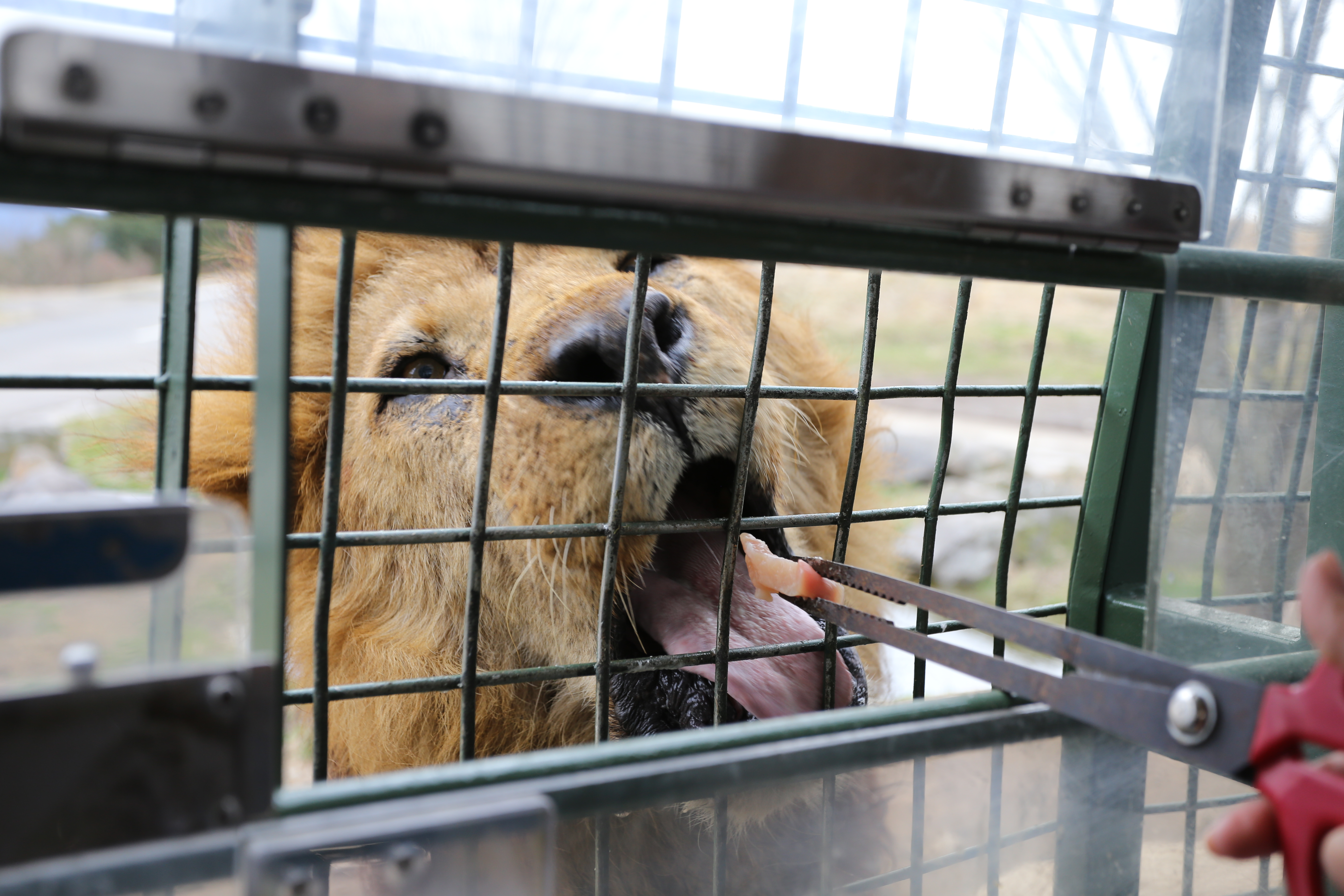
  Feeding the lions at "African Safari."
- Usa Jingū is situated in the city, and attracts as many as 1.8 million visitors annually. Nearby is the Ōita Prefectural Museum of History.

== Anecdotes ==
=== Product labeling ===
There have been claims that products made in this town and exported to the US as early as the 1930s carried the label "MADE IN USA", for it to appear as if the product was made in the United States. There are reports that the name of the town was changed to "USA" for this purpose. The aforementioned claims are false. The city had this name long before the 1960s. Usa is a city and products must be labeled by country of origin, making it highly improbable that this would be an adequate loophole. In addition, any products being imported to the U.S. marked as being "made in USA" would have been flagged.

== Notable people from Usa ==
- Futabayama Sadaji, 35th yokozuna in sumo
