= Shōtengai =

Type of Japanese commercial district

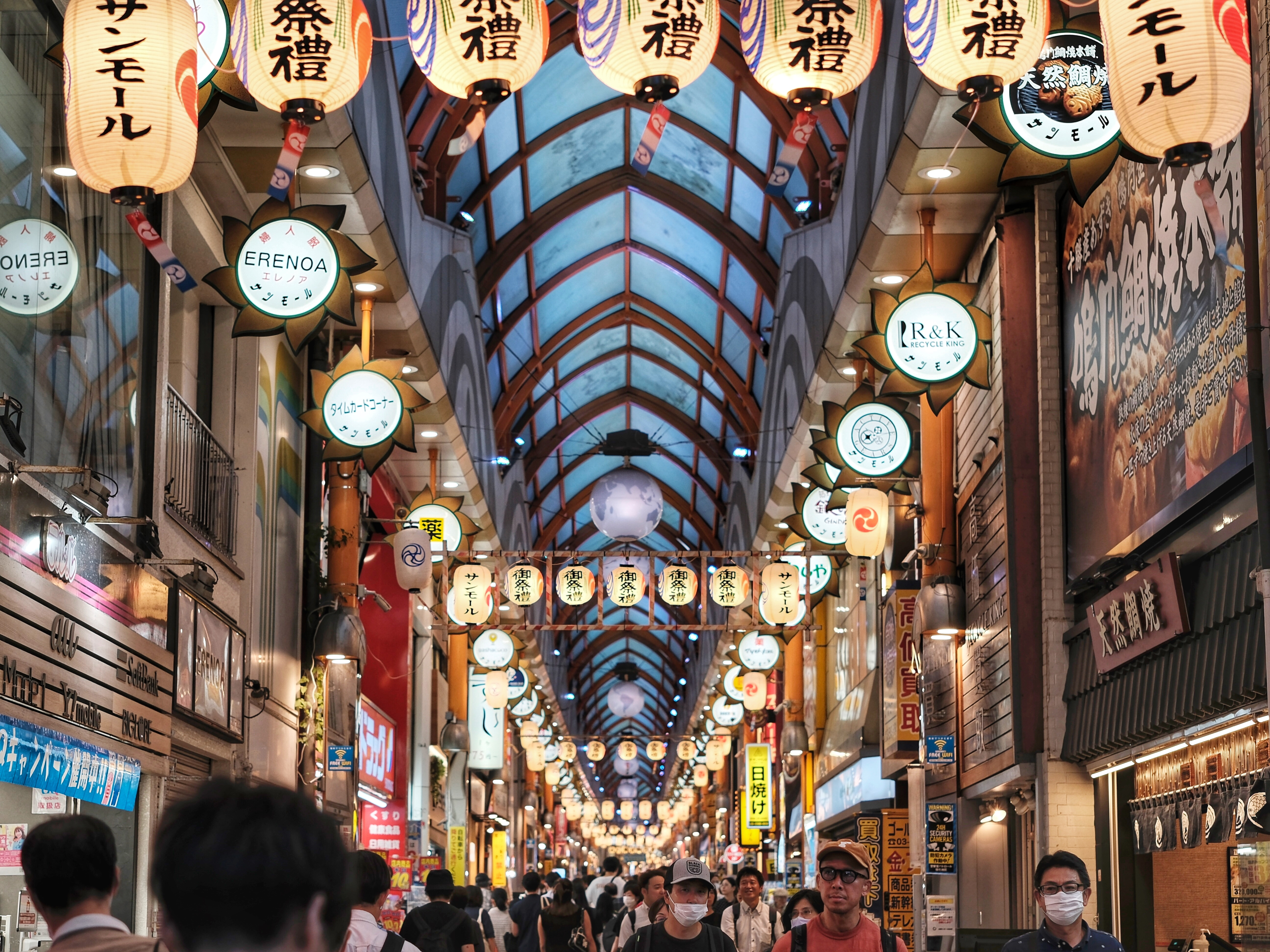
Nakano Sun Mall, a popular shōtengai in Nakano, Tokyo

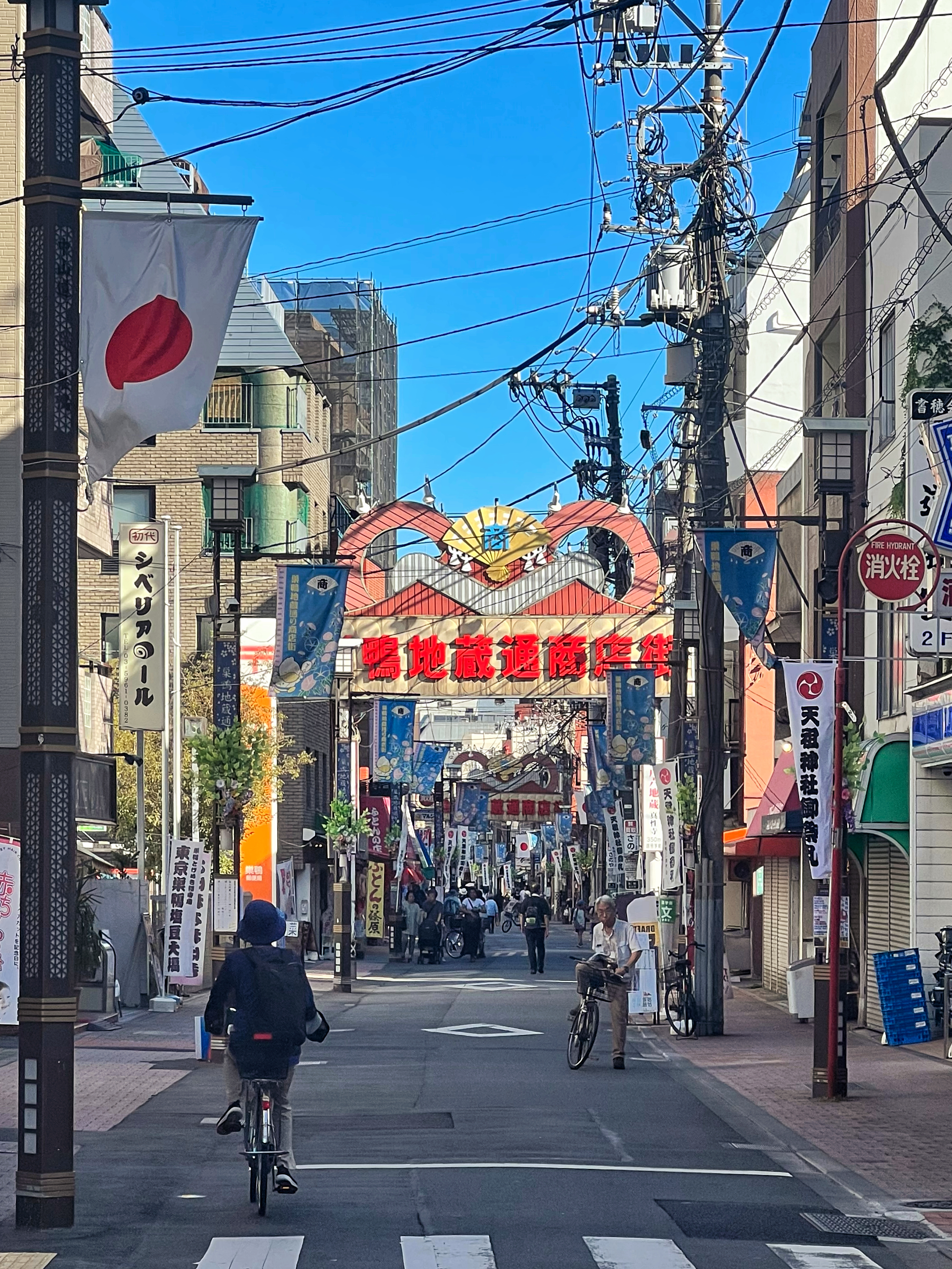
Sugamo Jizodori Shopping Street

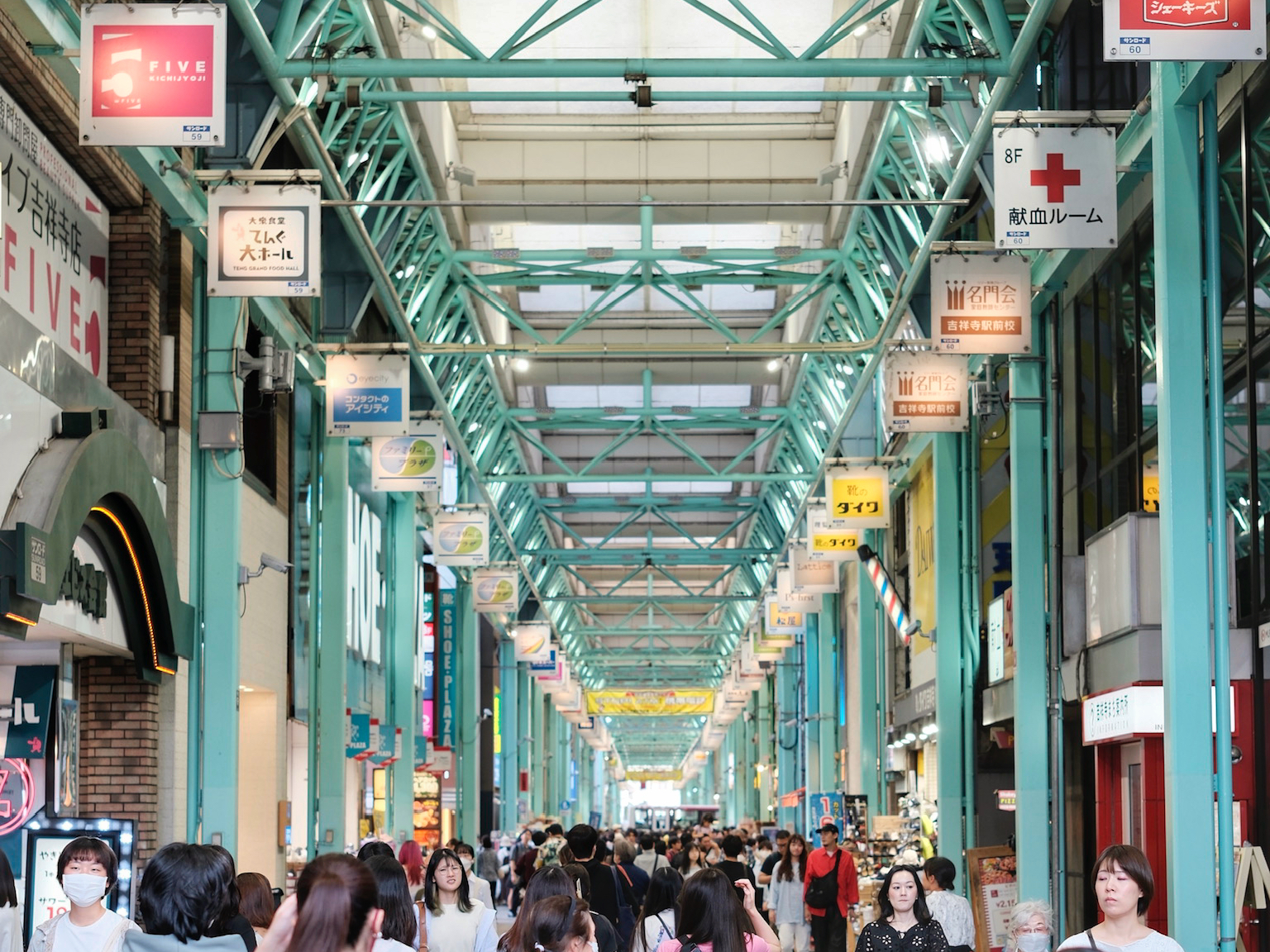
Interior view of Sun Road in Kichijōji, the shopping street at the north exit of Kichijōji Station in Tokyo.

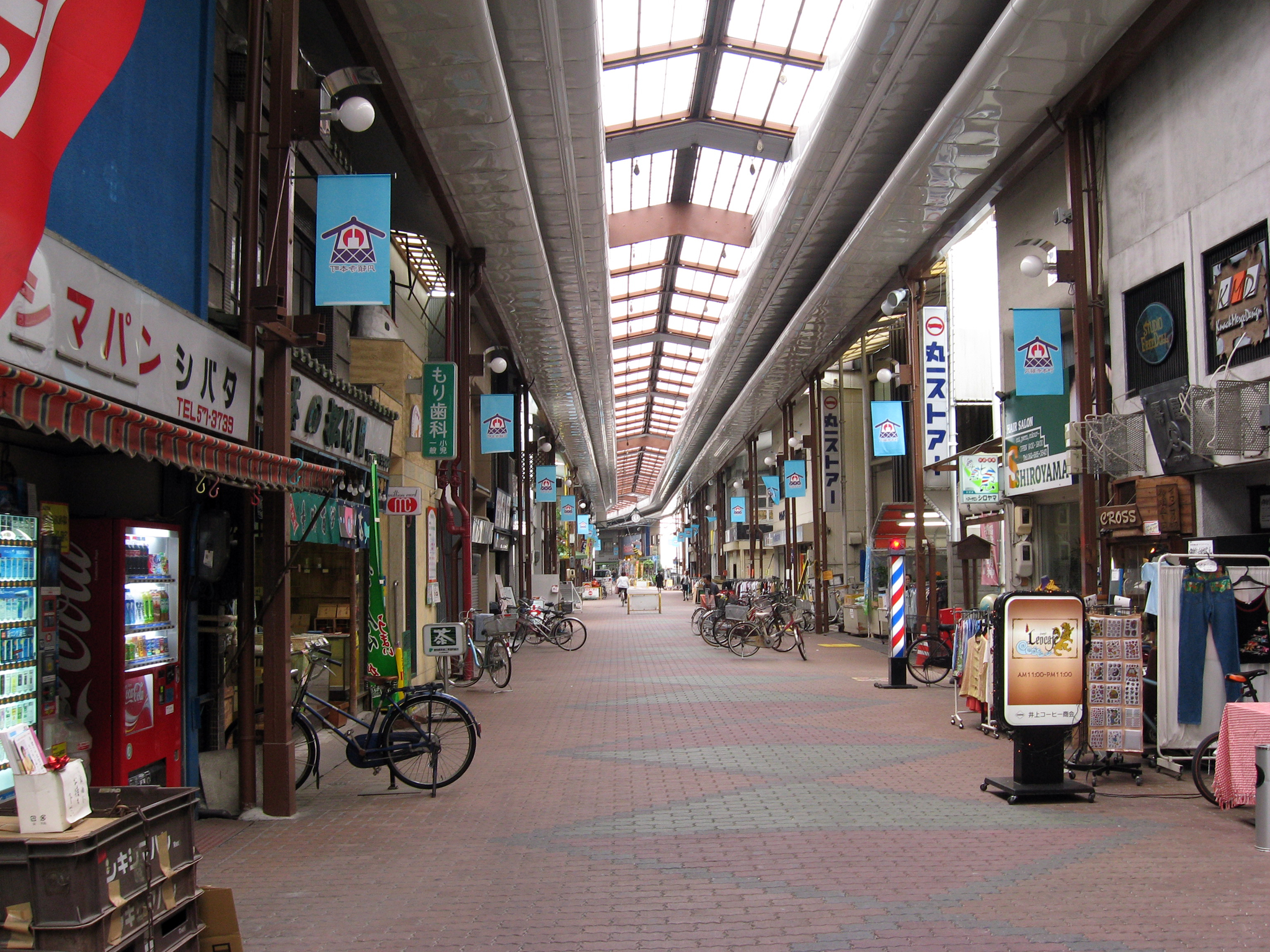
Endoji Hommachi in Nagoya

A shōtengai (商店街) is a style of Japanese commercial district, typically in the form of a local market street that is closed to car traffic. Local shōtengai cater to the needs of nearby residents with a diverse mix of small specialty shops and few large retailers. In many older neighborhoods, these streets serve as cultural gathering spaces, holding seasonal festivals, processions, and other events throughout the year.

Many older shōtengai developed along roads leading to large shrines or temples; Nakamise-dōri to Sensō-ji, Asakusa is a typical example. More modern shōtengai often connect to the nearest train or subway station, or other public gathering points such as large parks or landmarks. Most suburbs and towns of Japan have shōtengai of varying size, and larger shōtengai may take the form of covered arcades that are accessible only by foot or bicycle.

== Commercial features ==
A neighborhood shōtengai may be anchored by one or two large retailers (such as a grocery store or drug store), however the majority of retailers are typically small shops that specialize in specific products such as fruits, vegetables, meats, books, clothing, drugs, furniture, housewares, stationery; or specific services such as barber shops, printing shops, tailors, or cleaners. Restaurants and prepared foods within shōtengai commonly include izakaya, kissaten, wagashi, sushi, udon, ramen or tempura shops. Public services located within or adjacent to shōtengai often include a post office or neighborhood kōban police substation. In larger cities, more centrally located shōtengai often include a larger percentage of chain retailers, as well as hotels, convenience stores, or pachinko parlors.

== Cultural functions ==
Beyond their practical role as commercial districts, shōtengai serve as vital social spaces for Japanese neighborhoods, creating cohesion in a neighborhood through shop owner associations, and hosting seasonal festivals and events together with neighbors. An uncommon feature of most other urban commercial districts, the shop proprietors within shōtengai often own the buildings where their shops operate, rather than leasing space from a single landlord or development firm. This gives shōtengai shop owners more freedom to relate to and serve the social needs of their neighborhood, rather than being forced to focus solely on economic utility.

There are Showa retro shōtengai.

== See also ==
- Bazaar
- Commercial district
- Souq
- Mom and pop shop
- Shopping district
