= Takeshi Iwaya =

Japanese politician

- 岩屋 毅
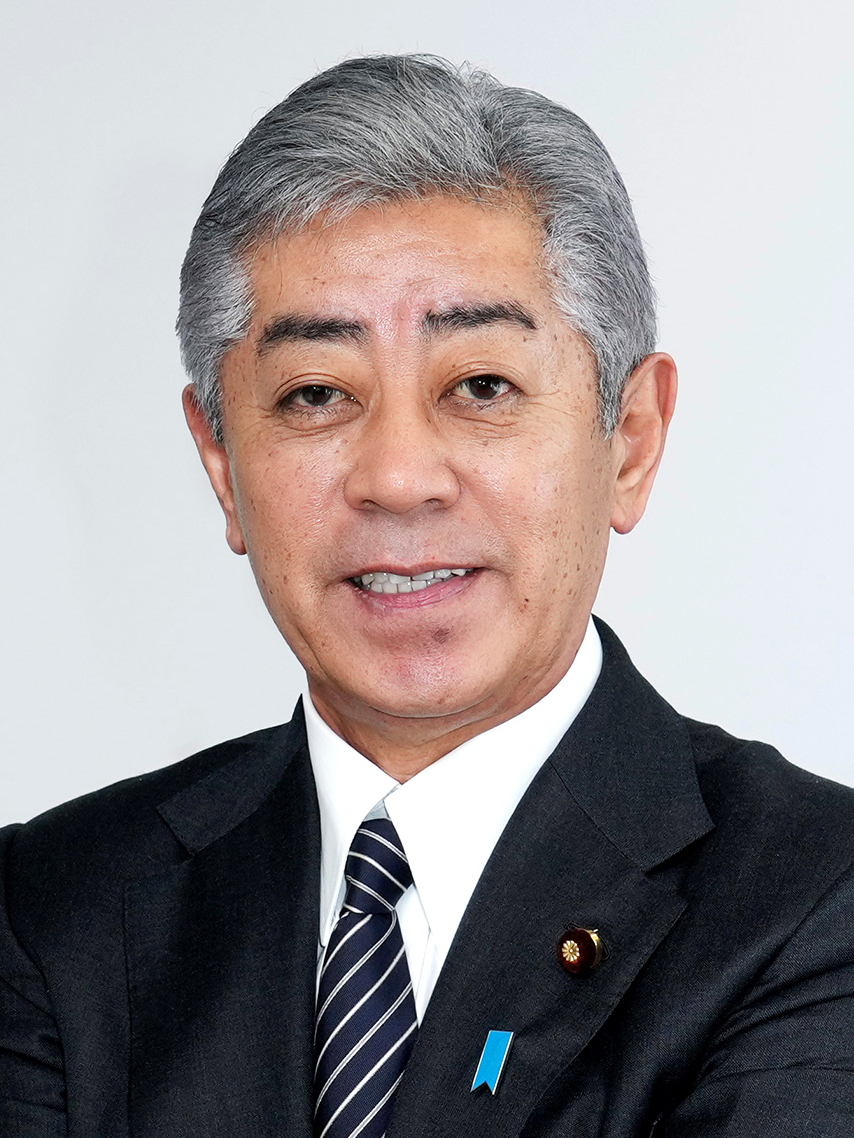
- Official portrait, 2024

Minister for Foreign Affairs
- In office 1 October 2024 – 21 October 2025
- Prime Minister: Shigeru Ishiba
- Preceded by: Yōko Kamikawa
- Succeeded by: Toshimitsu Motegi

Minister of Defense
- In office 2 October 2018 – 11 September 2019
- Prime Minister: Shinzo Abe
- Preceded by: Itsunori Onodera
- Succeeded by: Taro Kono

Member of the House of Representatives
- Incumbent
- Assumed office 26 June 2000
- Preceded by: Eijirō Hata
- Constituency: Ōita 3rd (2000–2009); Kyushu PR (2009–2012); Ōita 3rd (2012–present)
- In office 19 February 1990 – 18 June 1993
- Preceded by: Bunsei Satō
- Succeeded by: Katsuhiko Yokomitsu
- Constituency: Ōita 2nd

Member of the Ōita Prefectural Assembly
- In office 1987–1990

Personal details
- Born: 24 August 1957 (age 69) Beppu, Ōita, Japan
- Party: Liberal Democratic
- Other political affiliations: New Party Sakigake; New Frontier
- Education: Waseda University
- Website: Official website

Takeshi Iwaya (岩屋 毅, Iwaya Takeshi; born 24 August 1957) is a Japanese politician of the Liberal Democratic Party. He is a member of the House of Representatives in the Diet, or national legislature, and was the Minister of Foreign Affairs from 2024 to 2025. He served as the Minister of Defense from 2 October 2018 to 11 September 2019.

== Early life ==
A native of Beppu, Ōita, Takeshi Iwaya graduated from the School of Political Science and Economics at Waseda University.

== Political career ==
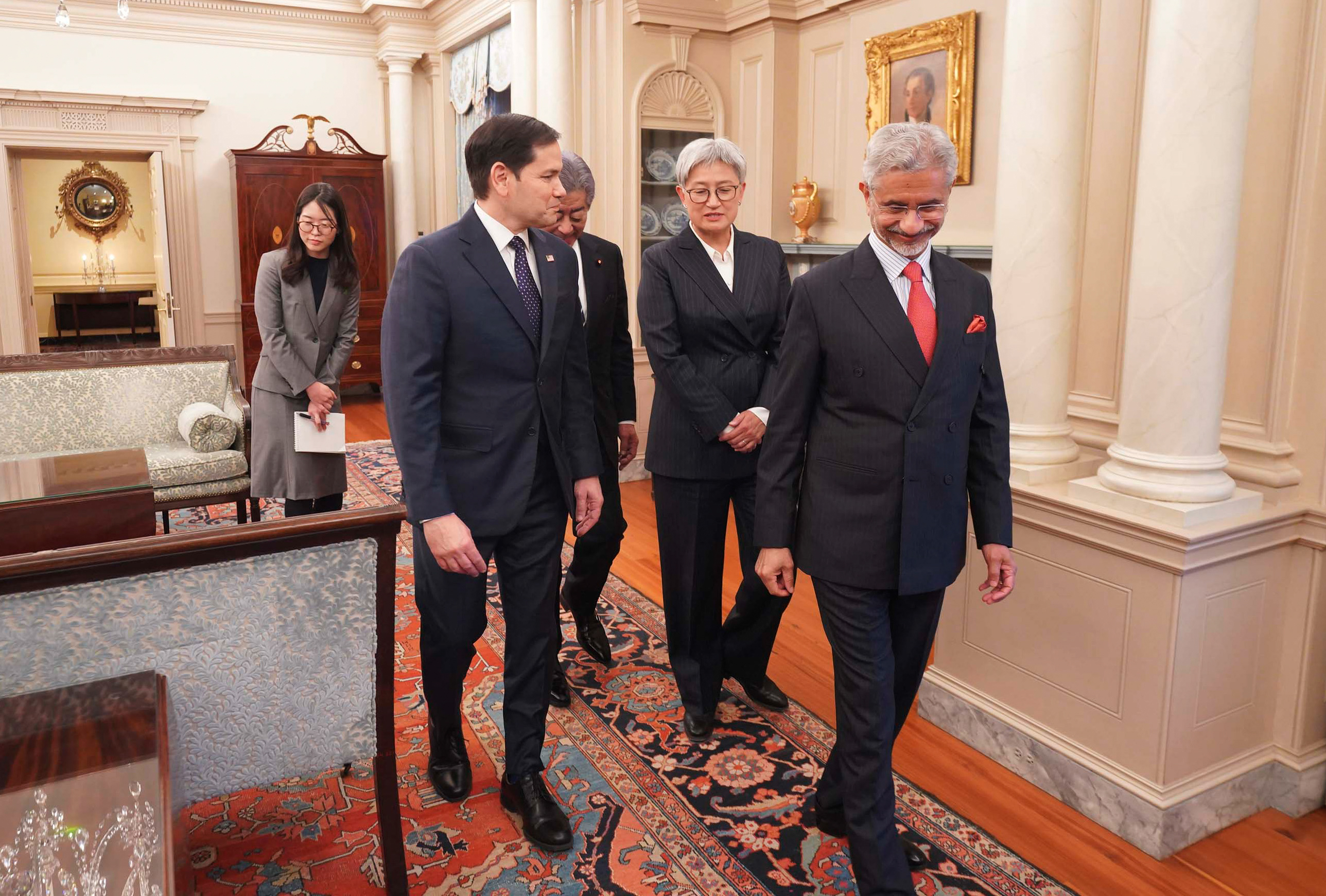
Iwaya with Quad member countries' foreign ministers; Marco Rubio, Penny Wong, and S. Jaishankar, 2025

Iwaya was elected to the assembly of Ōita Prefecture in 1987 (serving for one term), and to the House of Representatives for the first time in 1990 as an independent.

After losing his seat in 1993, he ran unsuccessfully for the house in 1996 but was re-elected in 2000.

Iwaya has served as State Minister of Foreign Affairs in the First Abe Cabinet and as Minister of Defense in the Fourth Abe Cabinet.

Iwaya was named to the position of Minister of Foreign Affairs in September 2024.

== Family ==
Takeshi Iwaya is the son of Kei Iwaya, a former member of the assembly of Ōita Prefecture.
