= Usa District, Ōita =

Former district in Ōita prefecture, Japan

Usa (宇佐郡, Usa-gun) was a district located in Ōita Prefecture, Japan.

As of 2003, the district had an estimated population of 12,739 and the density of 48.85 persons per km^{2}. The total area was 260.79 km^{2}.

Until March 30, 2005, the district had two towns:

- Ajimu
- Innai

== Merger ==
On March 31, 2005 - the towns of Ajimu and Innai were merged into the expanded city of Usa. Therefore, Usa District was dissolved as a result of this merger.
