= Nishikunisaki District, Ōita =

Former district in Ōita prefecture, Japan

Nishikunisaki (西国東郡, Nishikunisaki-gun) was a district located in Ōita Prefecture, Japan.

== District Timeline ==
- July 22, 1878 – Nishikunisaki District was founded after Kunisaki District broke off into Nishikunisaki and Higashikunisaki Districts.
- April 1, 1889 – Prior to activating the town and village status, the district founded the towns of Takada and Tamazu and 17 villages
- April 1, 1907 – The towns of Takada and Tamazu, and the villages of Kinawa and Miwa were merged to create the town of Takada.
- January 1, 1919 – The village of Kadaki was elevated to town status.
- April 1, 1941 – The villages of Nishimatama and Nakamatama were merged to create the village of Matama.
- April 1, 1951 The town of Takada, and the villages of Kawachi, Higashitoko, Nishitoko and Kusaji were merged to create the town of Takada.
- March 31, 1954:
  - The village of Kuresaki was merged into the town of Takada.
  - The villages of Matama, Kamimatama and Usuno were merged to create the village of Matama.
- May 10, 1954 – The town of Takada was renamed as the town of Bungotakada.
- May 31, 1954 – The village of Tahashi was merged with the town of Bungotakada to create the city of Bungotakada.
- August 31, 1954 – The town of Kakadi, and the villages of Miura and Mie were merged to create the town of Kakaji.
- October 1, 1954 – The villages of Asada and Tahara were merged to create the village of Ōta
- January 1, 1955 – The village of Matama was elevated to town status.
- March 31, 2005 – The towns of Kakaji and Matama were merged into the expanded city of Bungotakada.
- October 1, 2005 – The village of Ōta, along with the town of Yamaga (from Hayami District), was merged into the expanded city of Kitsuki. Nishikunisaki District was dissolved as a result of this merger.
