= Bungo Suidō Prefectural Natural Park =

Prefectural Natural Park in Ōita Prefecture, Japan

Coordinates: 33°4′10″N 131°57′16.2″E

- 豊後水道県立自然公園
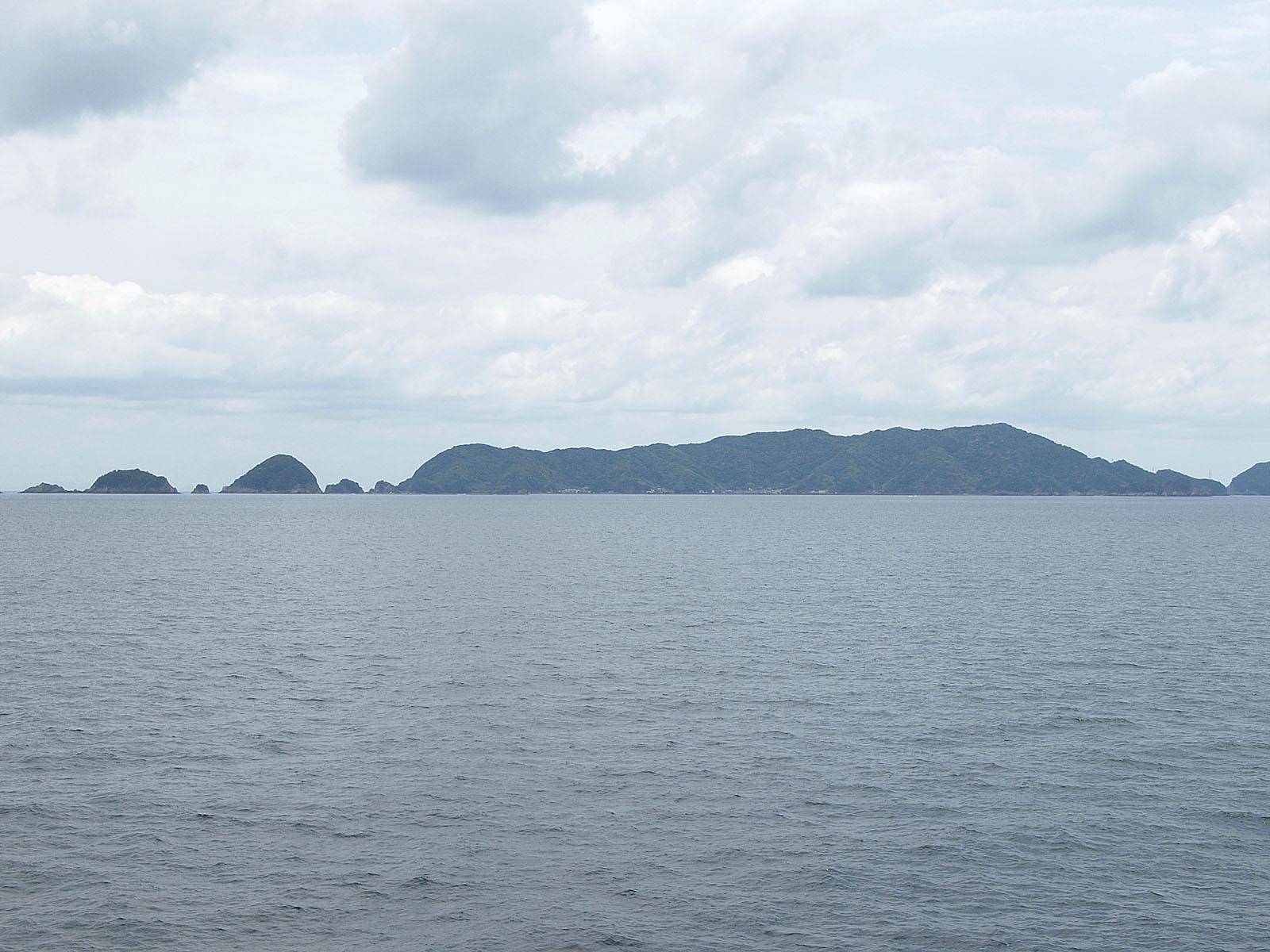
- Ōshima
- Interactive map of Bungo Suidō Prefectural Natural Park
- Location: Ōita Prefecture, Japan
- Area: 82.72 km^{2} (31.94 sq mi)
- Established: 30 March 1985

Bungo Suidō Prefectural Natural Park (豊後水道県立自然公園, Bungo Suidō kenritsu shizen kōen) is a Prefectural Natural Park on the east coast of Ōita Prefecture, Japan. Established in 1985, the park spans the municipalities of Saiki, Tsukumi, and Usuki. The park's central focus is upon the Bungo Strait.

== See also ==
- National Parks of Japan
- Nippō Kaigan Quasi-National Park
- Setonaikai National Park
