= Bombing of Hotojima =

World War Two Bombing of Hatojima

Bombing of Hotojima (Japanese: 保戸島空襲, Hepburn: Hotojima kūshū) was an air raid carried out by aircraft of the United States Navy on 25 July 1945 during the final stages of World War II. The strike hit the small island of Hotojima, off Tsukumi, Ōita Prefecture, Japan, causing severe civilian casualties.

== Background ==
During the Pacific War, the Imperial Japanese Navy operated radar and submarine-listening posts on Hotojima. Although the island had no heavy defenses, its monitoring facilities formed part of Japan's early-warning network.

== Air raid ==
On the morning of 25 July 1945, several US Navy F6F Hellcat fighters launched from escort carriers in the Bungo Channel attacked the island. A bomb hit the western wing of Hotojima National School during class. The aircraft, armed with six 0.50-inch (12.7 mm) Browning M2 machine guns, also strafed the collapsing building and school yard. A total of 127 people were killed—124 pupils, one teacher's infant, and two teachers—and more than 70 were injured. Eyewitnesses recorded by the city government recall that children fleeing across the yard were cut down by gunfire, and that many bodies lay scattered over the playground.

== Legacy ==
A memorial service is held annually on 25 July, and a granite monument inscribed with all 127 names stands near the former school site.
