= Jinkaku-ji =

Buddhist temple in Bungo-ōno, Ōita, Japan

Coordinates: 33°3′16.6″N 131°27′24.1″E

Jinkaku-ji 神角寺
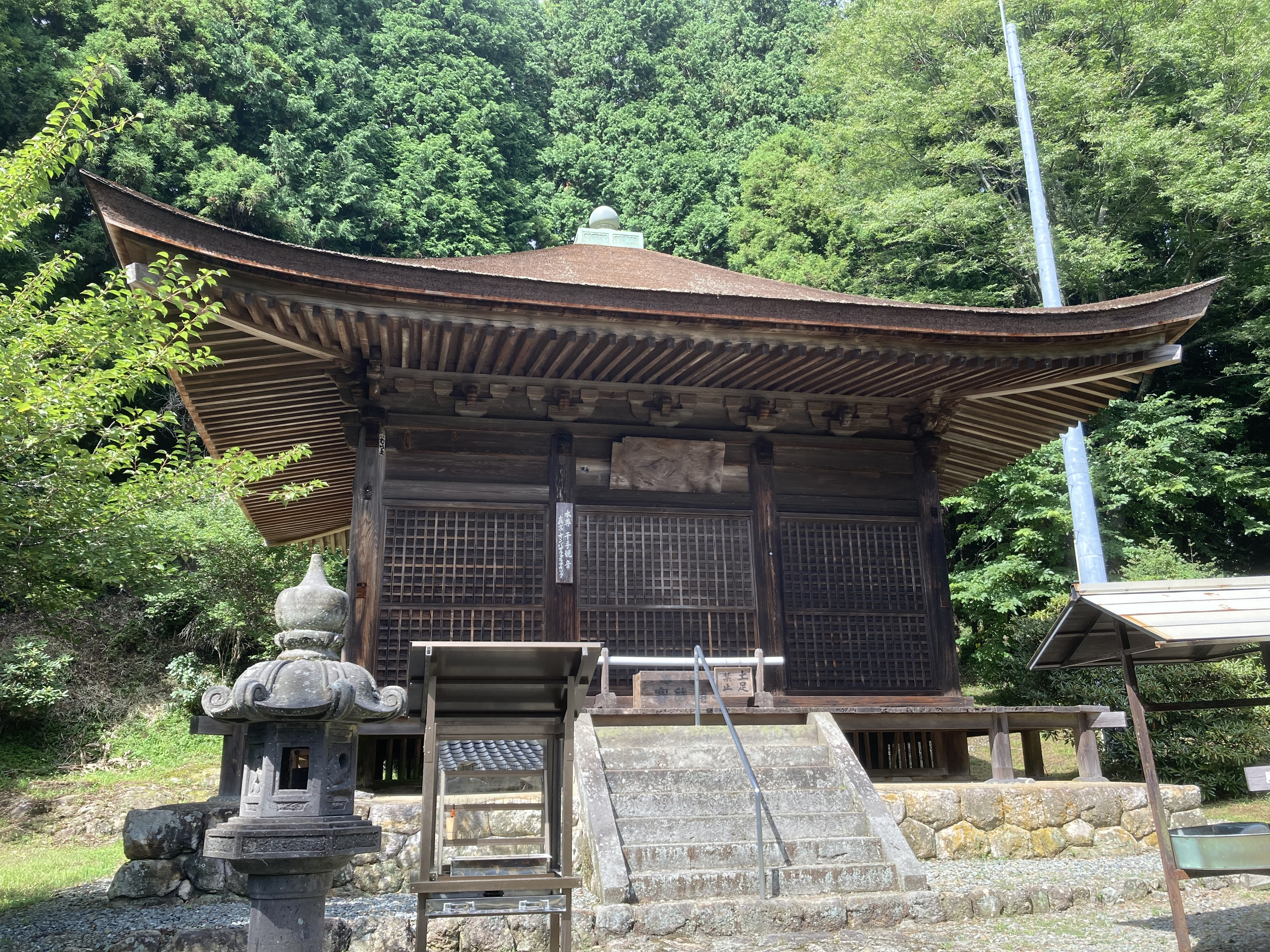

Religion
- Affiliation: Shingon

Location
- Location: Bungo-ōno, Ōita Prefecture
- Country: Japan
- Interactive map of Jinkaku-ji 神角寺

Architecture
- Completed: 570

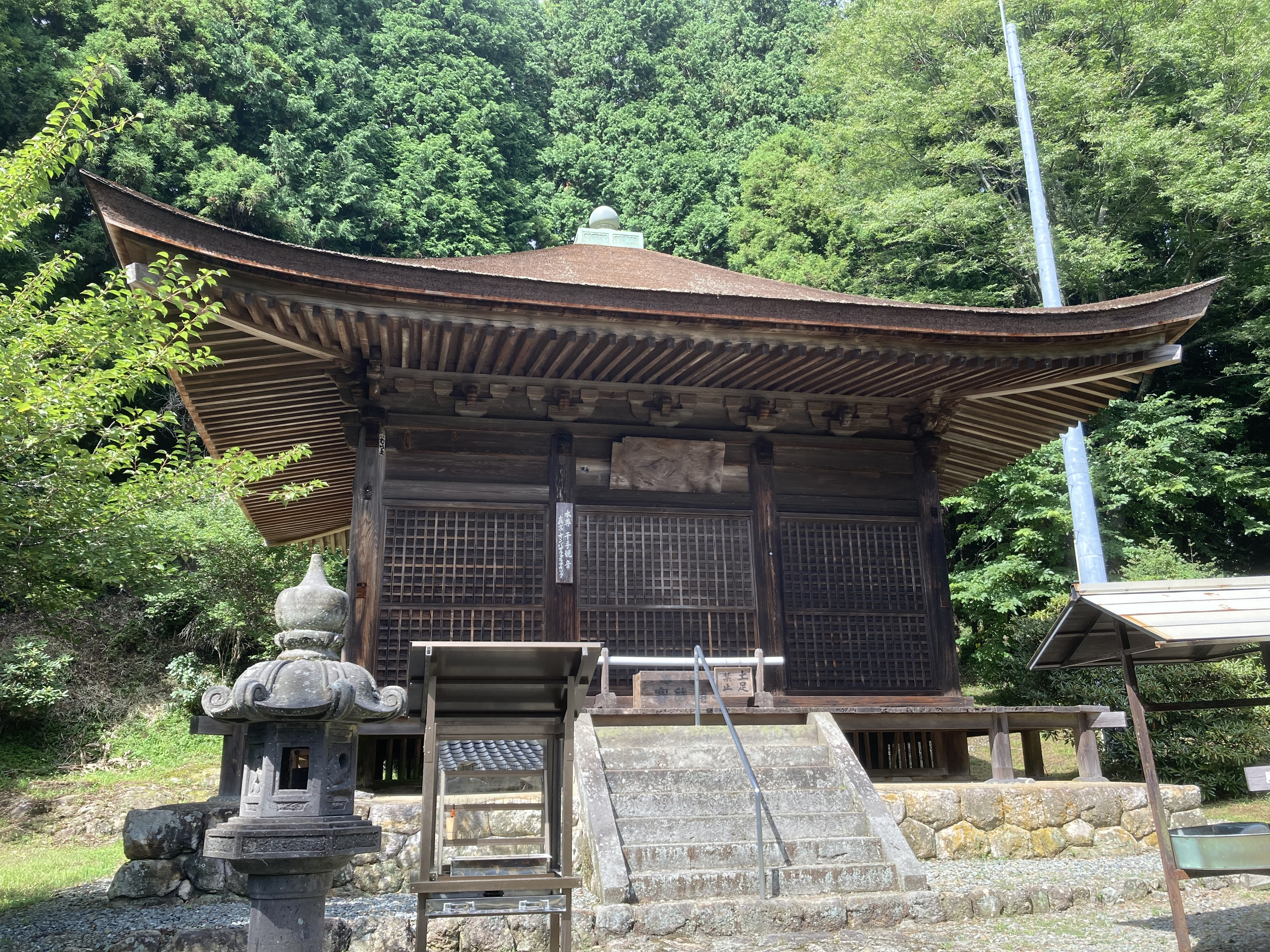
The main hall of Jinkakuji Temple, Torita, Asaji-cho, Bungo-Ono City, Oita Prefecture.

Jinkaku-ji (神角寺) is a Shingon temple in Bungo-ōno, Ōita Prefecture, Japan. Located within the Jinkakuji Serikawa Prefectural Natural Park, the temple is said to have been established in 570, during the reign of Emperor Kinmei. The Hondō (1369) and Kamakura-period Kongōrikishi have been designated Important Cultural Properties. The roof of the main hall was repaired in 1963.

== See also ==
- Fuki-ji
