= Jinkakuji Serikawa Prefectural Natural Park =

Japanese nature park

Coordinates: 33°3′14.4″N 131°27′23″E

- 神角寺芹川県立自然公園
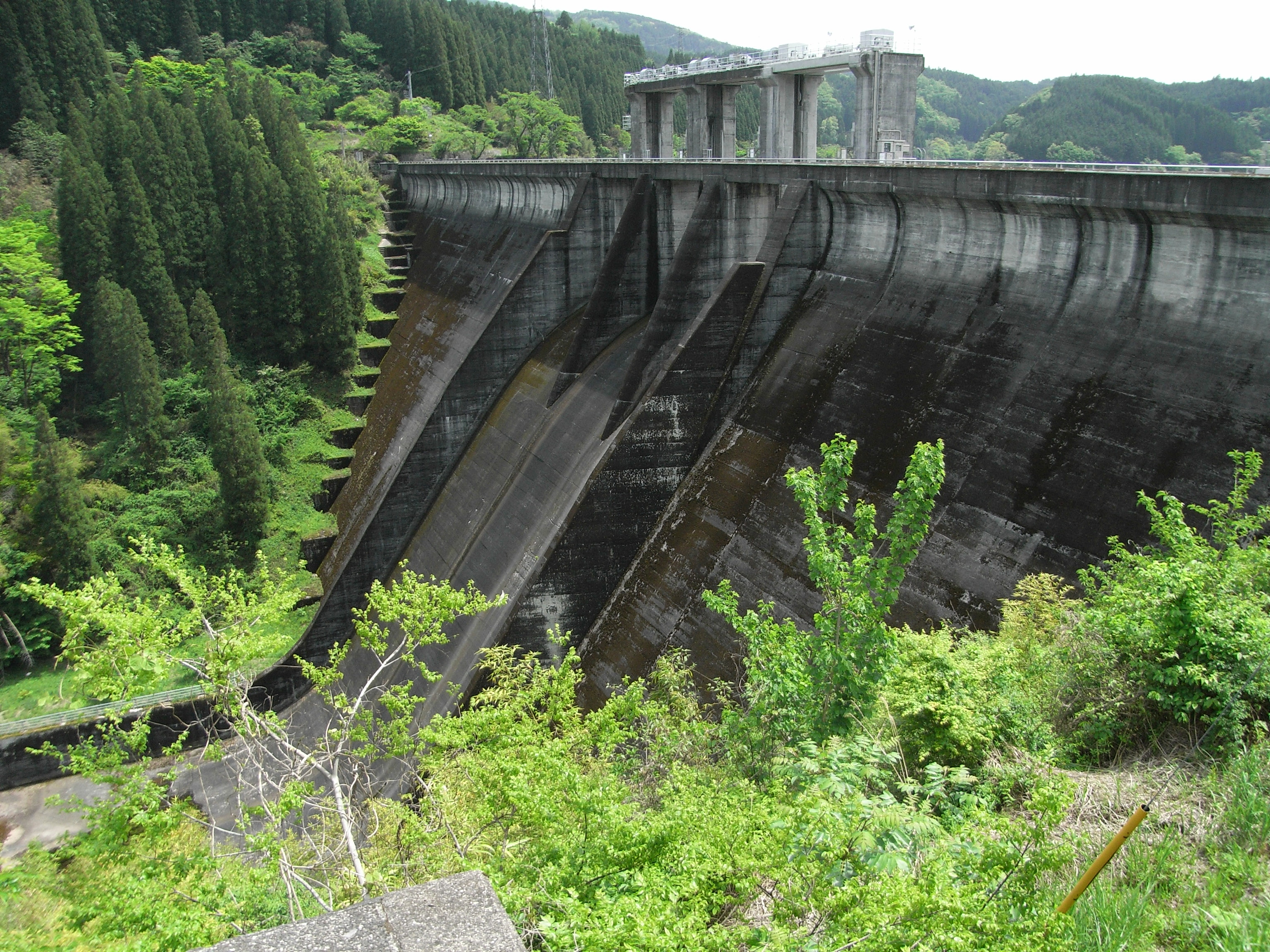
- Serikawa Dam
- Interactive map of Jinkakuji Serikawa Prefectural Natural Park
- Location: Ōita Prefecture, Japan
- Area: 100.63 km^{2} (38.85 sq mi)
- Established: 30 March 1951

Jinkakuji Serikawa Prefectural Natural Park (神角寺芹川県立自然公園, Jinkakuji Serikawa kenritsu shizen kōen) is a Prefectural Natural Park in central Ōita Prefecture, Japan. Established in 1951, the park spans the municipalities of Bungo-ōno, Ōita, Taketa, and Yufu. The park derives its name from the temple Jinkaku-ji and the Seri River.

== See also ==
- National Parks of Japan
