= Nippō Kaigan Quasi-National Park =

National Park in Japan

- 日豊海岸国定公園
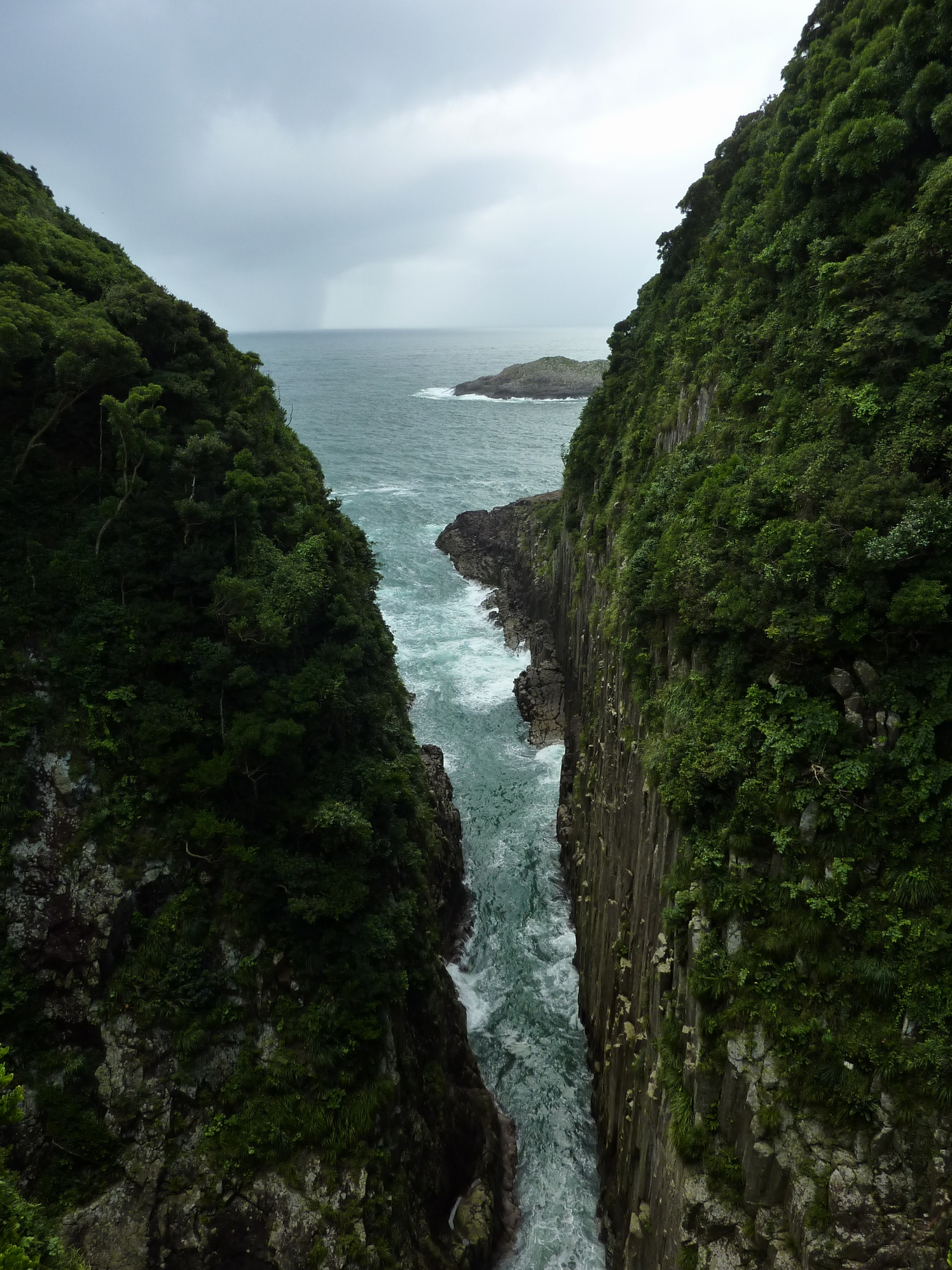
- Umagase in Hyūga

- Location within Japan
- Location: Ōita/Miyazaki Prefectures, Japan
- Coordinates: 32°38′N 131°47′E
- Area: 85.18 km^{2} (32.89 sq mi)
- Established: February 15, 1974

Nippō Kaigan Quasi-National Park (日豊海岸国定公園, Nippō Kaigan Kokutei Kōen) is a Quasi-National Park on the coast of Ōita and Miyazaki Prefectures, Japan. It was established in 1974.

== Related municipalities ==
- Miyazaki: Hyūga, Kadogawa, Nobeoka
- Ōita: Ōita, Saiki, Tsukumi, Usuki

== See also ==
- List of national parks of Japan
- Bungo Channel
