= Kunisaki Hantō Prefectural Natural Park =

Natural park in Oita prefecture, Japan

- 国東半島県立自然公園
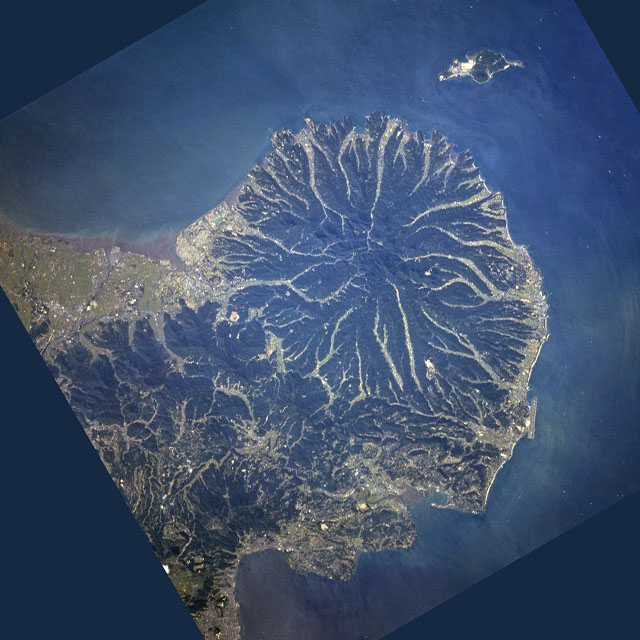
- Kunisaki Peninsula
- Interactive map of Kunisaki Hantō Prefectural Natural Park
- Location: Ōita Prefecture, Japan
- Area: 196.91 km^{2} (76.03 sq mi)
- Established: 30 March 1951

Kunisaki Hantō Prefectural Natural Park (国東半島県立自然公園, Kunisaki Hantō kenritsu shizen kōen) is a Prefectural Natural Park on the Kunisaki Peninsula in northeast Ōita Prefecture, Japan. Established in 1951, the park spans the municipalities of Bungotakada, Kitsuki, Kunisaki, and Usa. The park encompasses the temples of Fuki-ji and Maki Ōdō as well as Kumano magaibutsu, and includes a marine zone of 41 km^{2}.

== See also ==
- National Parks of Japan
- Setonaikai National Park
