= Tsue Sankei Prefectural Natural Park =

Natural park in Oita prefecture, Japan

Coordinates: 33°7′47″N 130°52′49.1″E

- 津江山系県立自然公園
- Interactive map of Tsue Sankei Prefectural Natural Park
- Location: Ōita Prefecture, Japan
- Area: 162.46 km^{2} (62.73 sq mi)
- Established: 30 March 1951

Tsue Sankei Prefectural Natural Park (津江山系県立自然公園, Tsue Sankei kenritsu shizen kōen) is a Prefectural Natural Park in western Ōita Prefecture, Japan. Established in 1951, the park is within the municipality of Hita and encompasses Mounts Gozen (御前岳), Shaka (釈迦岳), and Togami (渡神岳).

== See also ==
- National Parks of Japan
