= Serikawa Dam =

Dam in Ōita Prefecture, Japan

Serigawa Dam
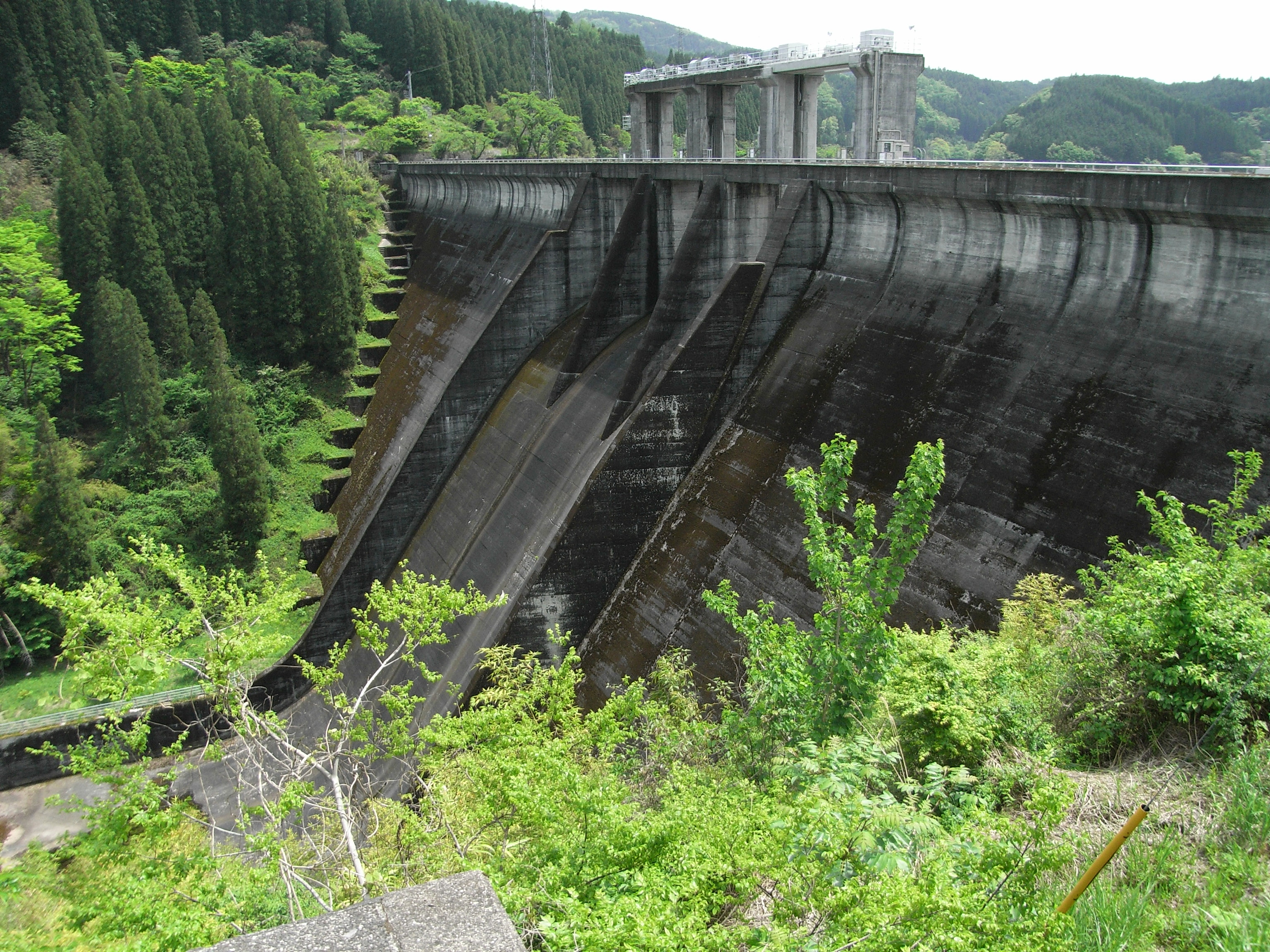
- Interactive map of Serigawa Dam
- Official name: 芹川ダム
- Location: Ōita Prefecture, Japan
- Coordinates: 33°08′23″N 131°26′28″E
- Construction began: 1952
- Opening date: 1956

Dam and spillways
- Type of dam: Gravity dam
- Height: 52.2 m (171 ft)
- Length: 193 m (633 ft)
- Dam volume: 122,000 m^{3}

Reservoir
- Total capacity: 27,500,000 m^{3}
- Catchment area: 118 km^{2}
- Surface area: 135 ha

Serigawa Dam (Japanese: 芹川ダム) is a dam in the Ōita Prefecture, Japan, completed in 1956. In 2009, the Provincial Business Office decided to temporarily stop the dam's production of electricity, due to low water and production levels.
