= Ōita Prefecture =

Prefecture of Japan

Ōita Prefecture 大分県
- Prefecture

Japanese transcription(s)
  - Japanese: 大分県
  - Rōmaji: Ōita-ken
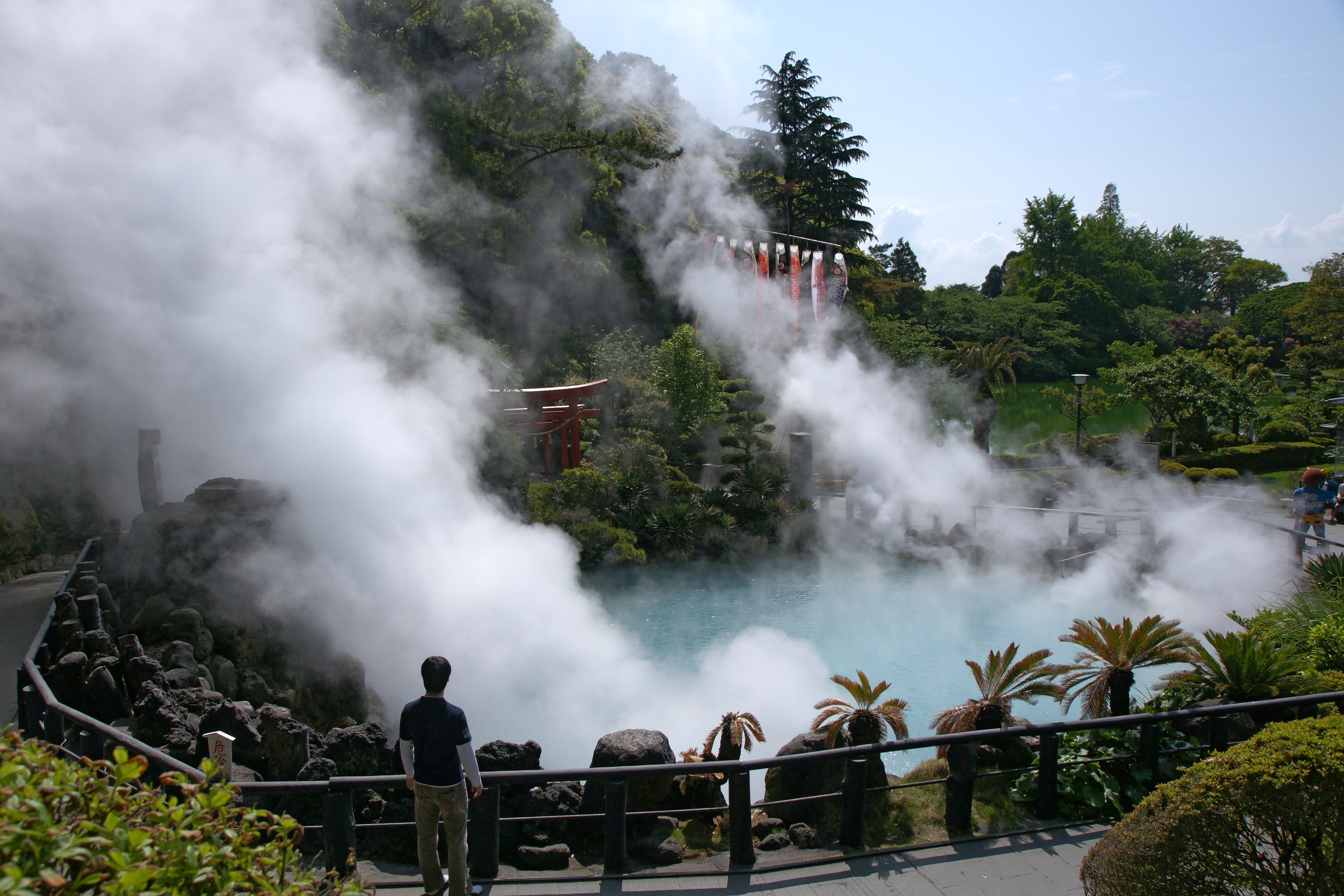
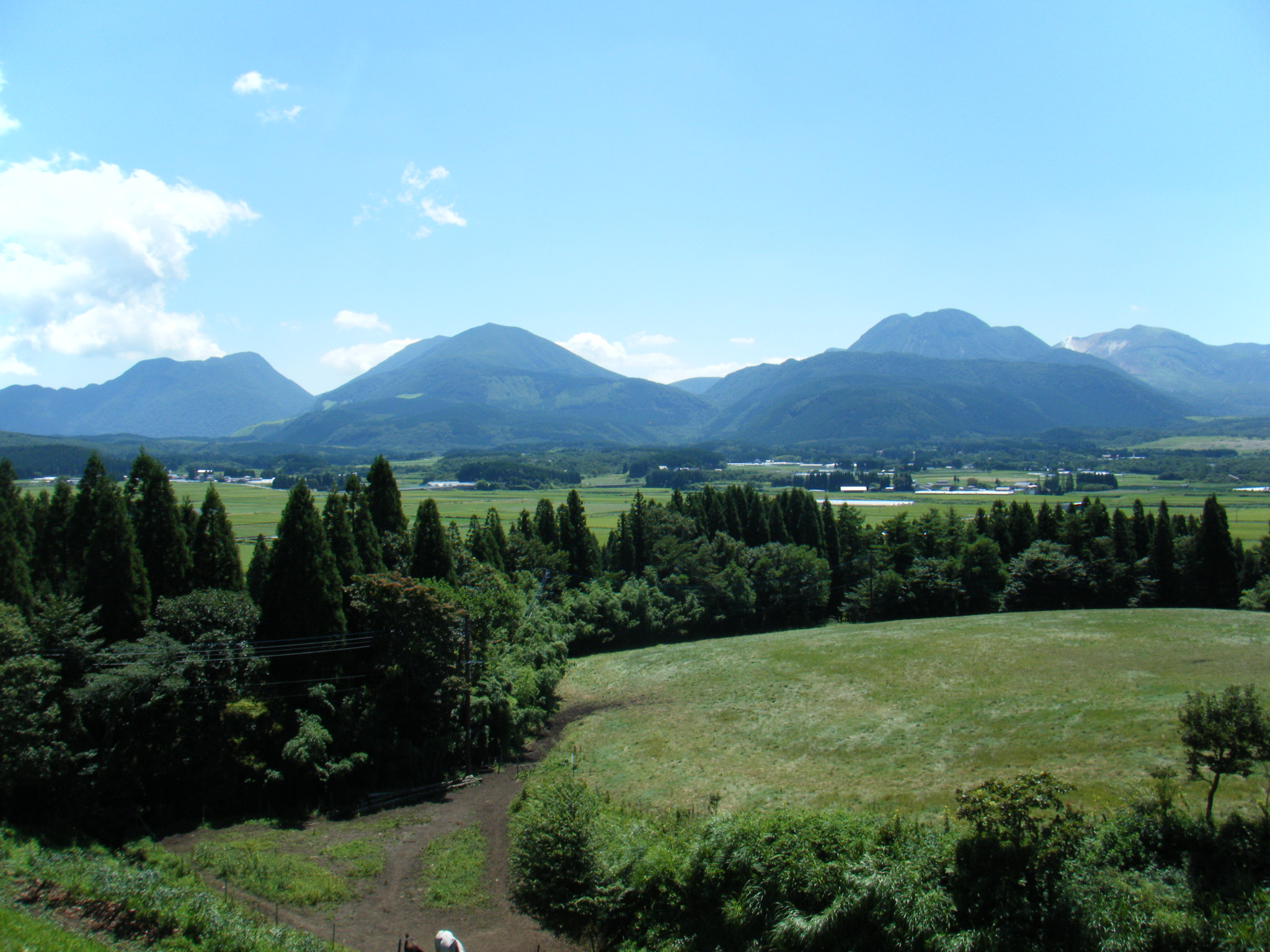
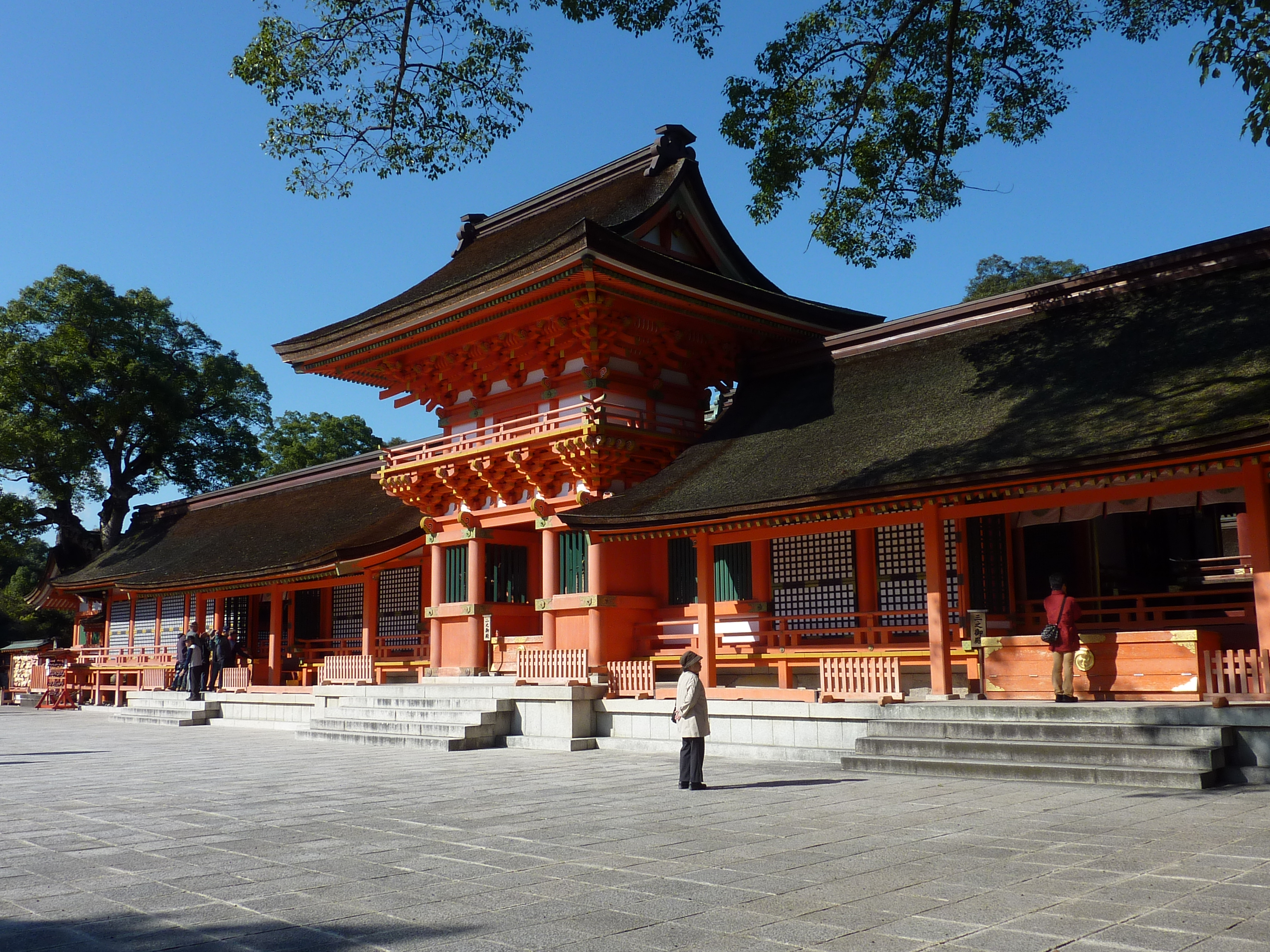
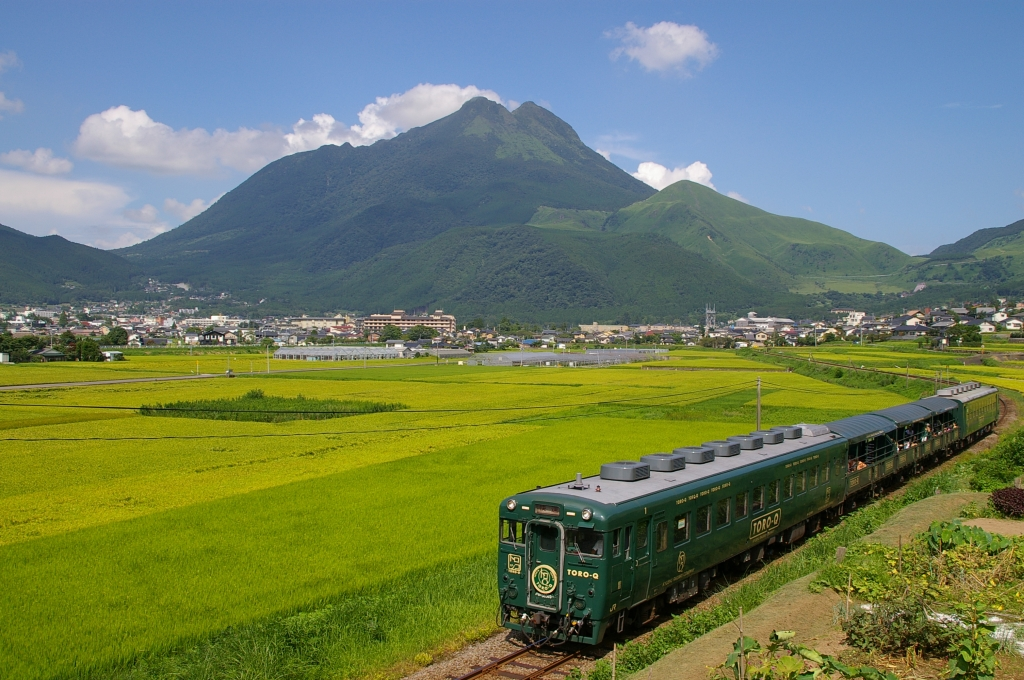
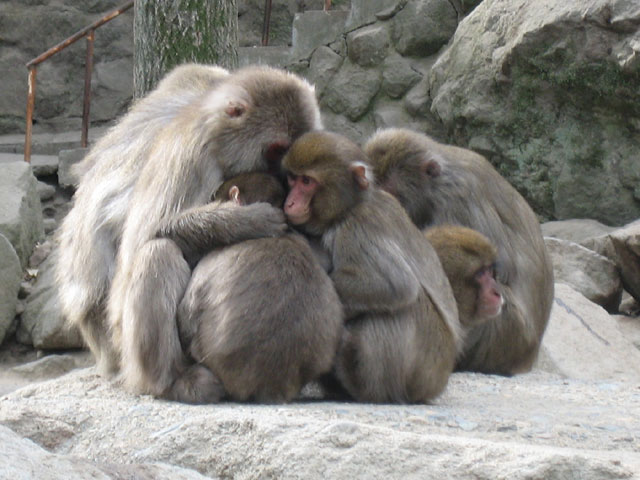
- Beppu Onsen Handa highlands Usa Jingū Mount Yufu Takasakiyama Natural Zoological Garden

- Flag Symbol

- Location within Japan
- Coordinates: 33°14′17.47″N 131°36′45.38″E
- Country: Japan
- Region: Kyushu
- Island: Kyushu
- Capital: Ōita
- Subdivisions: Districts: 3, Municipalities: 18

Government
  - Governor: Kiichiro Satō

Area
  - Total: 6,340.73 km^{2} (2,448.17 sq mi)
  - Rank: 22nd

Population (september 1, 2026)
  - Total: 1,063,808
  - Rank: 34rd
  - Density: 167.774/km^{2} (434.532/sq mi)

GDP
  - Total: JP¥4,901 billion US$36.2 billion (2022)
- ISO 3166 code: JP-44
- Website: www.pref.oita.jp
- Symbols of Japan
- Bird: Japanese white-eye (Zosterops japonica)
- Flower: Bungo-ume blossom (Prunus mume var. bungo)
- Tree: Bungo-ume tree (Prunus mume var. bungo)

Ōita Prefecture (大分県, Ōita-ken; Japanese pronunciation: [ó̞ò̞.ì.tä̀, ò̞ó̞.í.tä́(.kè̞ɴ̀), ó̞ó̞.í.tä́(.kè̞ɴ̀)]) is a prefecture of Japan located on the island of Kyūshū. Ōita Prefecture has a population of 1,081,646 (1 February 2025) and has a geographic area of 6,340 km^{2} (2,450 sq mi). Ōita Prefecture borders Fukuoka Prefecture to the northwest, Kumamoto Prefecture to the southwest, and Miyazaki Prefecture to the south.

Ōita is the capital and largest city of Ōita Prefecture, with other major cities including Beppu, Nakatsu, and Saiki. Ōita Prefecture is located in the northeast of Kyūshū on the Bungo Channel, connecting the Pacific Ocean and Seto Inland Sea, across from Ehime Prefecture on the island of Shikoku. Ōita Prefecture is famous for its hot springs and is a popular tourist destination in Japan for its onsen and ryokan, particularly in and around the city of Beppu. It has more onsen than any other Japanese prefecture.

== History ==
Around the 6th century, Kyushu consisted of four regions: Tsukushi Province, Hi Province, Kumaso Province and Toyo Province.

Toyo Province was later divided into two regions, upper and lower Toyo Province, called Bungo Province and Buzen Province.

After the Meiji Restoration, districts from Bungo and Buzen provinces were combined to form Ōita Prefecture. These provinces were divided among many local daimyōs and thus a large castle town never formed in Ōita. From this time that whole area became known as "Toyo-no-Kuni", which means "Land of Abundance".

The origins of the name Ōita are documented in a report from the early 8th century called the Chronicles of Bungo (豊後国風土記, bungonokuni-fudoki). According to the document, when Emperor Keikō visited the Kyushu region, stopping first in Toyo-no-Kuni, he exclaimed that 'This is a vast land, indeed. It shall be known as Okita-Kuni!' Okita-Kuni, meaning "Land of the Great Fields", later came to be written as "Ōita". Present day interpretations based on Ōita's topography state that Oita's name comes from "Okita", meaning "many fields", rather than "vast" or "great" field, because of Ōita's complex terrain.

In the Edo period (1603–1867) the town of Hita was the government seat for the entire domain of Kyushu, which was directly controlled by the national government or shōgun at that time. The region became well known for the money-lending industry based out of Hita. Merchants in Hita's Mameda and Kuma districts worked with the national government to create this money-lending industry known as Hita-kin.

=== Shrines and temples ===
Sasamuta-jinja and Yusuhara Hachiman-gū are the chief Shinto shrines (ichinomiya) in the prefecture.

Usa Jjingū, the head shrine of more than 40,000 Hachiman shrines, is located in Usa, Ōita.

== Geography ==
Ōita Prefecture is on the north-eastern section of the island of Kyūshū. It is 119 kilometres (74 mi) from east to west, and 106 kilometres (66 mi) from north to south, with a total area of 6,340.71 square kilometers.

Surrounded by the Suo Channel and Honshū Island to the north, the Iyo Channel and Shikoku Island to the east, it is bordered by Miyazaki Prefecture to the south, and Fukuoka Prefecture and Kumamoto Prefecture to the west. It is divided between north and south by a major tectonic line running from Usuki City in Ōita Prefecture to Yatsushiro City in Kumamoto Prefecture, which is to the west of Ōita. There are several other tectonic lines running from east to west through the prefecture. The northern part of the prefecture features granite and metamorphic rocks, while the southern area features limestone, which is the foundation for the Tsukumi cement industry, and several limestone caves. The Kirishima Range is a volcanic belt that runs vertically through the prefecture and contributes to the many hot spring sources that make the region a popular tourist attraction and makes Ōita the prefecture with the largest number of hot springs in the whole country.

The mountain ranges include the peaks of Mount Yufu, Mount Tsurumi, Mount Sobo, Mount Katamuki, and Mount Kujū (which is called the "roof of Kyushu"). These mountain ranges contribute to the fact that 70% of Oita is covered by forests, and the rivers and streams that flow from these ranges give the prefecture rich water sources. The prefecture's major water sources are the Yamakuni River (with the Heisei Ozeki Dam and Yabakei Dam on it), Yakkan River, Ōita River, Ōno River (with Hakusui Dam on it), and Banjō River. The coastline features include Beppu Bay and the Bungo Channel.

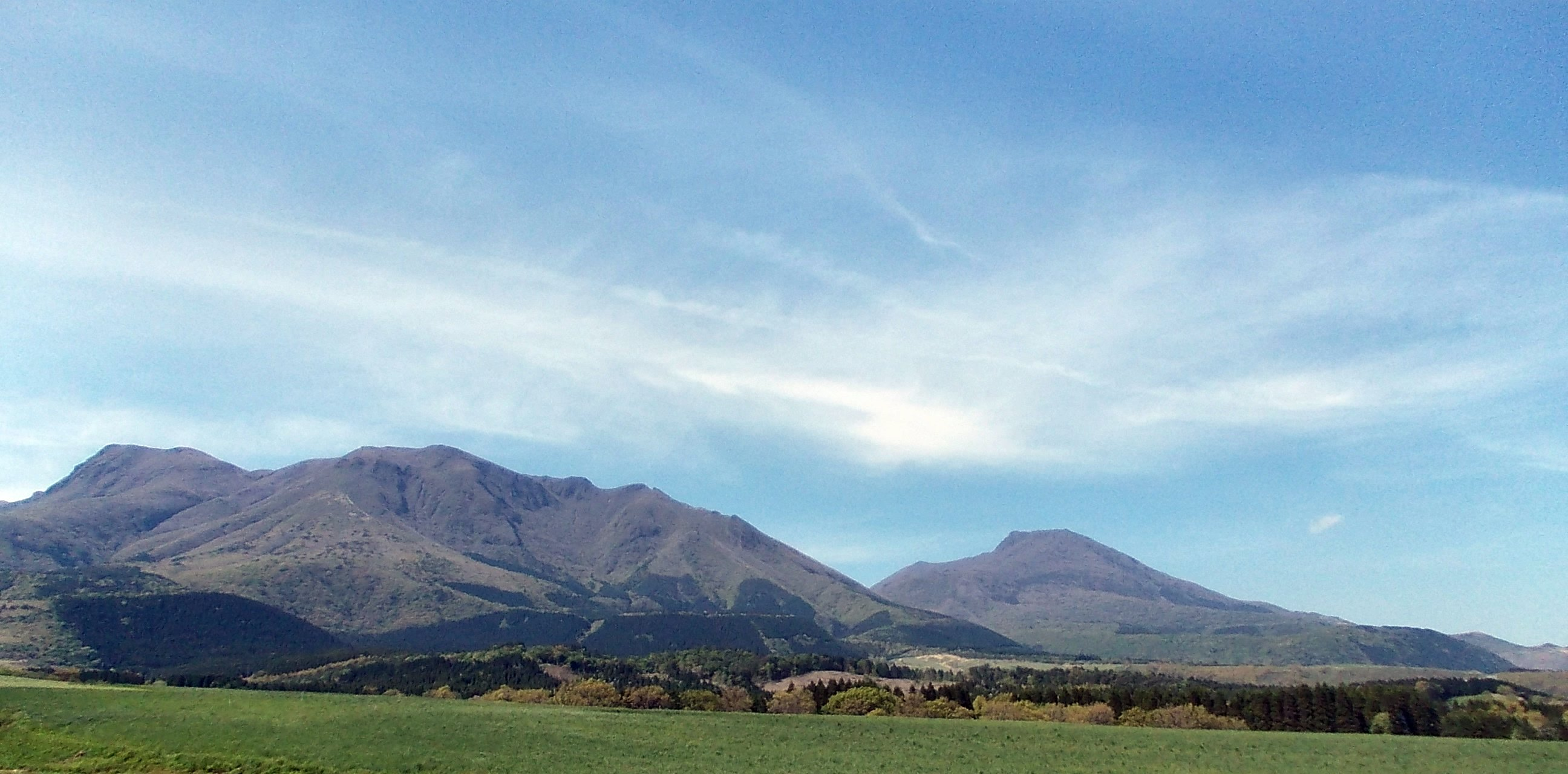
Kujū Mountains

Mount Kujū, a volcano, is surrounded by highlands called the Kujū Highlands and the Handa Highlands. The main agriculture activity on the plateau grasslands north and south of Mt. Kujū is dairy farming. There are open plains throughout the prefecture with Nakatsu Plain in the north, Oita Plain in the center, and Saiki Plain in the south. The inland areas consist of basin valleys in Hita, Kusu, Yufuin and Taketa, which were formed by lava buildup in combination with river erosion.

Ōita has a 759 km (472 mi) coastline that has shoals in the north, Beppu Bay in the center, and a jagged or sawtooth "rias coastline" in the south. Sea cliffs, caves, and sedimentary rock formations that can be found in Saiki City's Yakata Island are considered very rare outside of coral reef areas. Ōita's coastal waters contribute to a prosperous fishing industry.

As of April 1, 2014, 28% of the total land area of the prefecture was designated as Natural Parks, namely the Aso Kujū and Setonaikai National Parks; the Nippō Kaigan, Sobo-Katamuki, and Yaba-Hita-Hikosan Quasi-National Parks; and the Bungo Suidō, Jinkakuji Serikawa, Kunisaki Hantō, Sobo Katamuki, and Tsue Sankei Prefectural Natural Parks.

=== Current municipalities ===
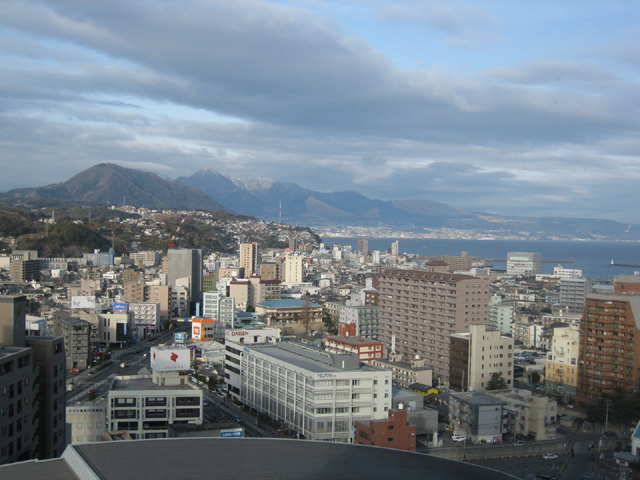
Oita City

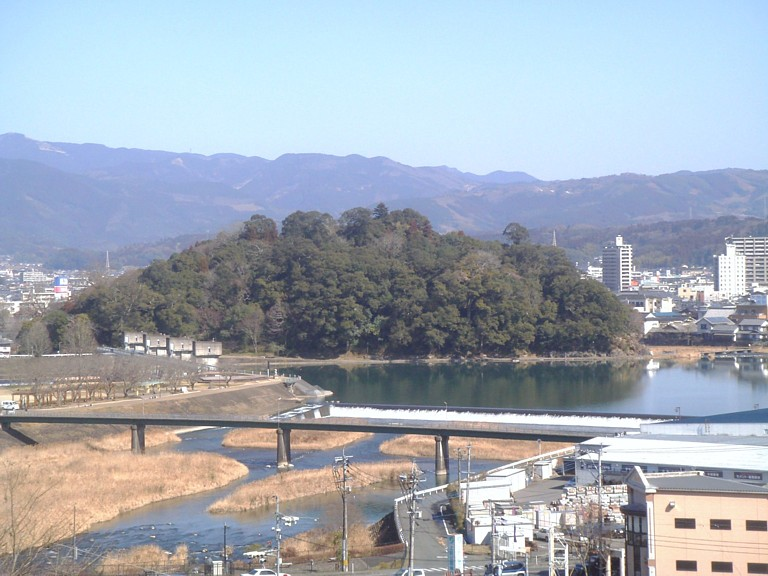
Hita

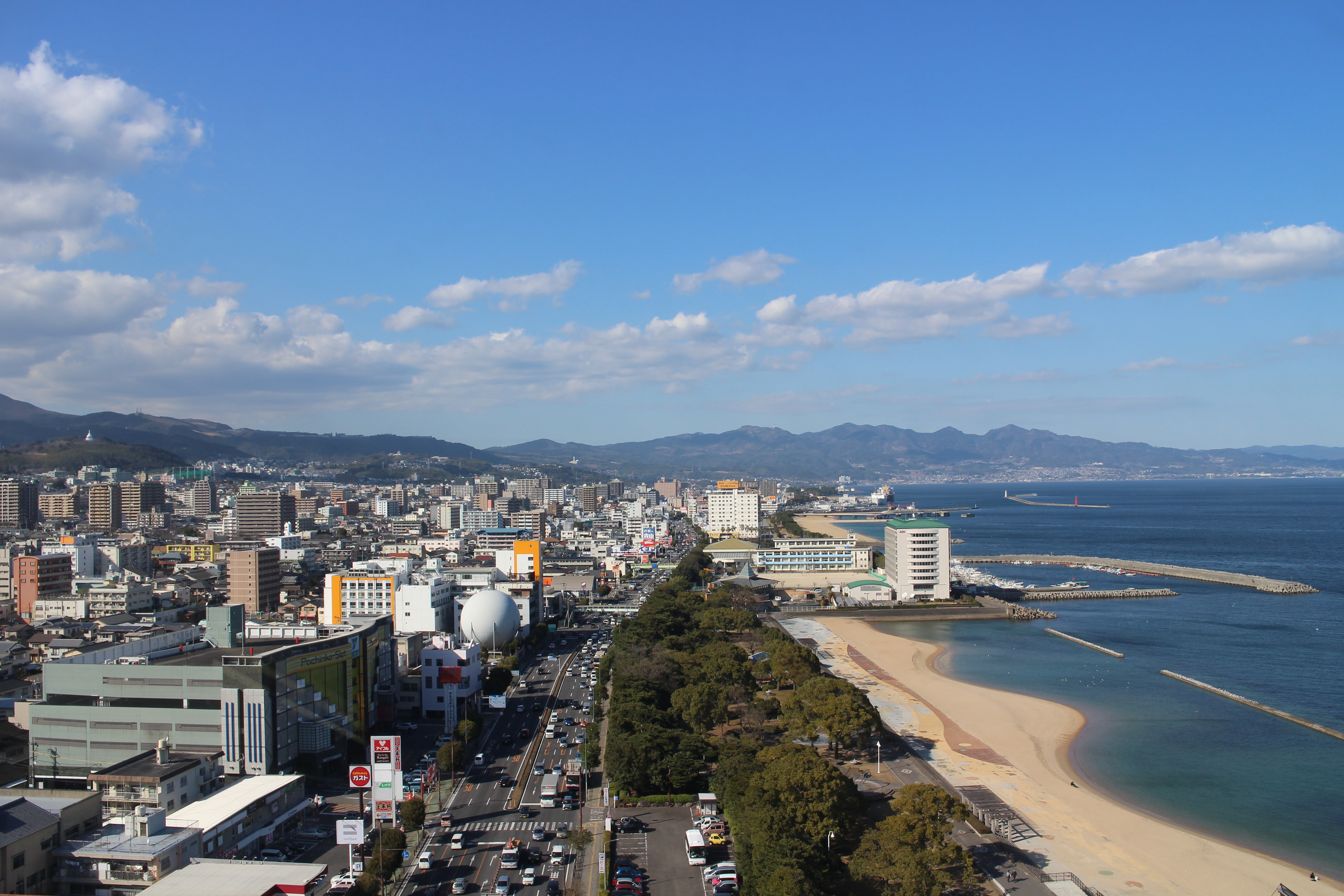
Beppu

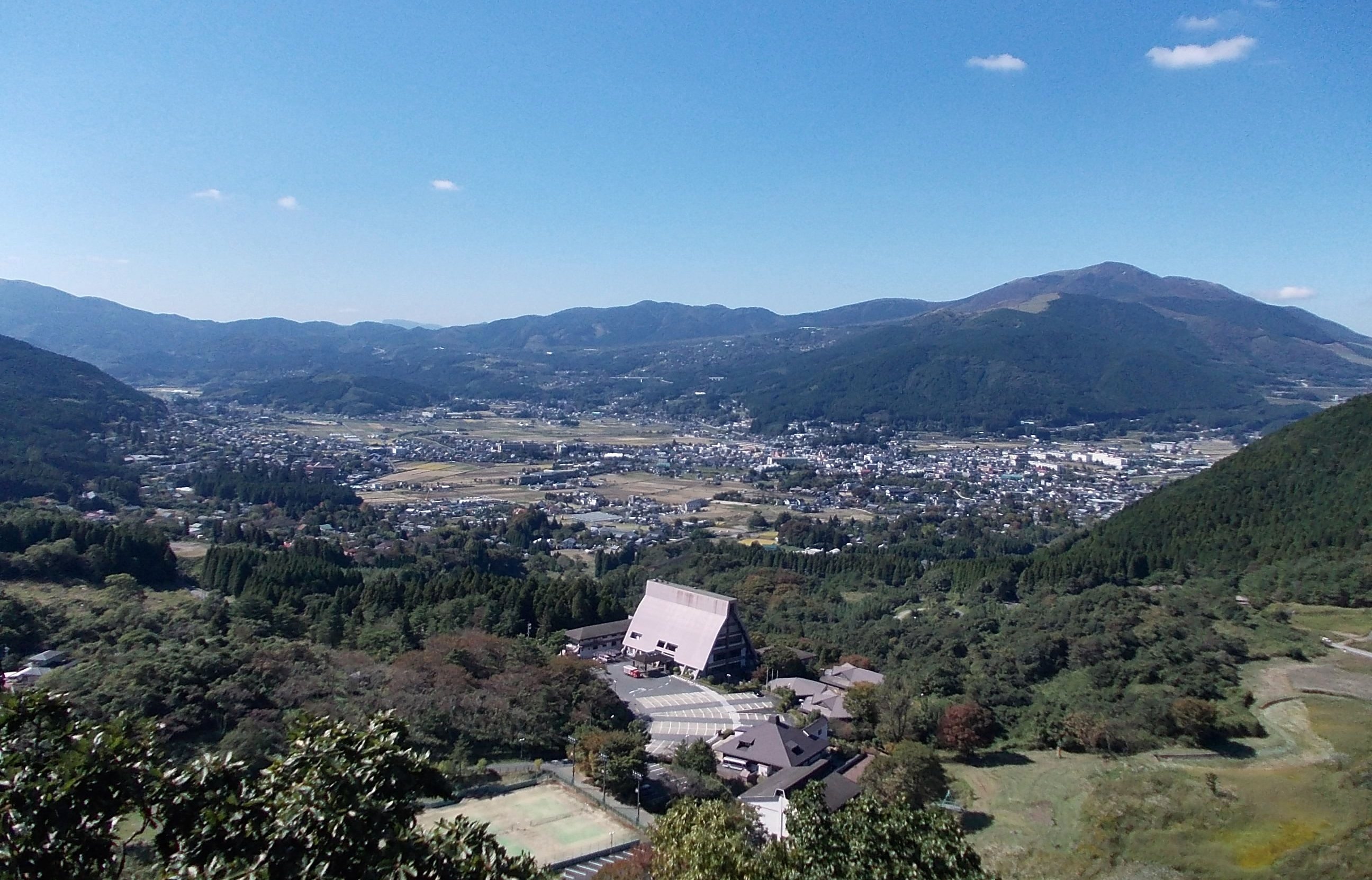
Yufu

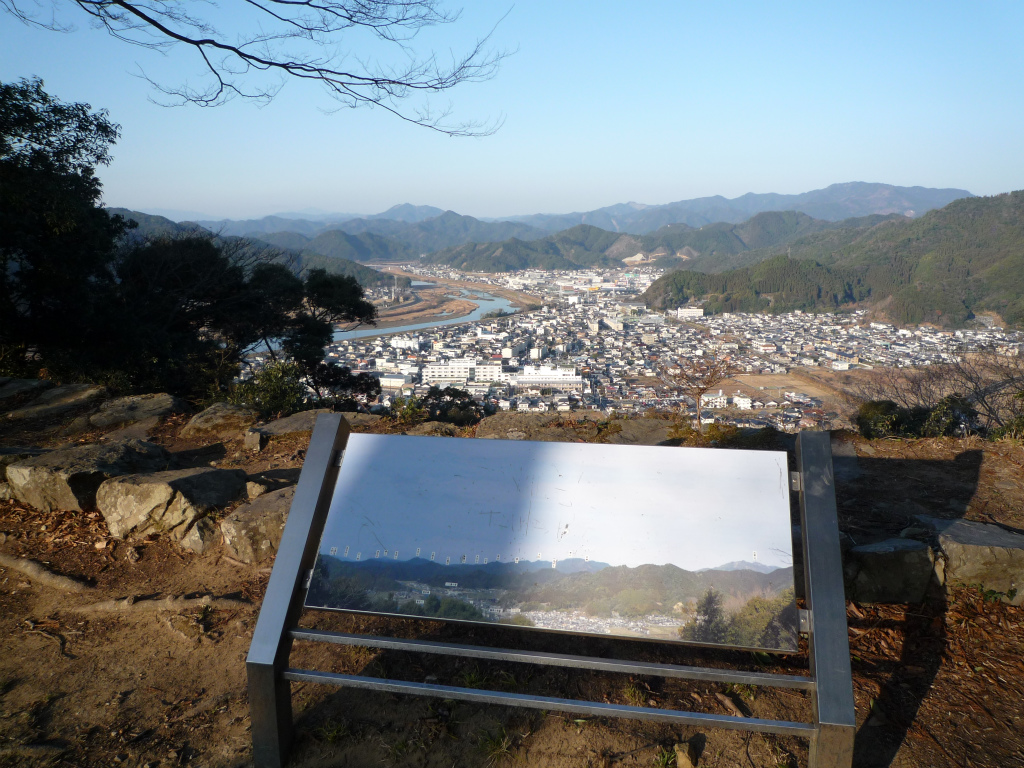
Saiki

Currently, the prefecture has 14 cities, 3 districts, 3 towns, and one village. From 2005 to 2006, all municipalities but Beppu, Tsukumi, Himeshima, Hiji, and all towns in Kusu District, were merged, and the total municipalities went down from 58 on December 31, 2004, to 18 after the creation of the city of Kunisaki by merging with 4 towns from Higashikunisaki District on March 31, 2006. As a result, the prefecture became the one with the fewest municipalities within Kyūshū, and the fourth fewest in Japan. However, Ōita Prefecture now has the fewest towns (3) and fewest towns and villages combined (4) in all of Japan.

Municipalities in Ōita Prefecture City Town

=== Cities ===
Fourteen cities are located in Ōita Prefecture:

Name		Area (km^{2})	Population	Map
Rōmaji	Kanji	Area (km^{2})	Population	Map
Beppu	別府市	125.34	113,045	
Bungo-Ōno	豊後大野市	603.14	32,846	
Bungotakada	豊後高田市	206.24	21,980	
Hita	日田市	666.03	61,148	
Kitsuki	杵築市	280.08	26,761	
Kunisaki	国東市	318.10	25,721	
Nakatsu	中津市	491.53	82,301	
Ōita (capital)	大分市	502.38	474,804	
Saiki	佐伯市	903.11	65,870	
Taketa	竹田市	477.53	19,456	
Tsukumi	津久見市	79.48	15,492	
Usa	宇佐市	439.05	52,808	
Usuki	臼杵市	291.20	34,155	
Yufu	由布市	319.32	33,556	

=== Towns and villages ===
These are the towns and villages in each district:

Name		Area (km^{2})	Population	District	Map
Rōmaji	Kanji	Area (km^{2})	Population	District	Map
Hiji	日出町	73.32	28,025	Hayami District	
Himeshima	姫島村	6.98	1,930	Higashikunisaki District	
Kokonoe	九重町	271.37	8,536	Kusu District	
Kusu	玖珠町	286.51	14,085	Kusu District	

=== Mergers and dissolutions ===
If the district dissolved, then the link will be in place.

- Hayami District:
  - Yamaga, Hiji
- Higashikunisaki District:
  - Aki, Kunimi, Kunisaki, Musashi, Himeshima
- Ōno District:
  - Notsu, Asaji, Chitose, Inukai, Kiyokawa, Mie, Ogata, Ōno
- Ōita District:
  - Notsuharu, Hasama, Shōnai, Yufuin
- Kitaamabe District:
  - Saganoseki
- Shimoge District:
  - Hon'yabakei, Sankō, Yabakei, Yamakuni
- Minamiamabe District:
  - Honjō, Kamae, Kamiura, Naokawa, Tsurumi, Ume, Yayoi, Yonōzu
- Hita District:
  - Amagase, Kamitsue, Maetsue, Nakatsue, Ōyama
- Usa District:
  - Ajimu, Innai
- Nishikunisaki District:
  - Kakaji, Matama, Ōta
- Naoiri District:
  - Kujū, Naoiri, Ogi

== Economy ==
Ōita Prefecture's industrial activity is centered on agricultural products. Fishery products and manufactured goods rank second and third respectively in terms of Ōita's industrial activity.

Ōita is Japan's number one producer of the following products:

Kabosu limes: Ōita Prefecture is Japan's number one producer of kabosu, a citrus fruit that is similar to a lime. Kabosu are available year-round but peak season for taste and quality is from August to October. Kabosu are rich in vitamin C and contain beneficial acids, such as citric acid. Kabosu have been produced in the Taketa and Usuki areas for many years.

Dried shiitake mushrooms: Ōita is the largest producer of dried shiitake mushrooms in Japan, and the cultivation of shiitake mushrooms is said to have originated in Ōita. Ōita's dried shiitake rank number one in Japan in production quantity and quality. Shiitake are said to be beneficial in the prevention of high blood pressure and arterial sclerosis.

Saffron: Saffron has been cultivated in Ōita since the late 19th century, and Ōita's Taketa area produces 80% of Japan's total amount of saffron, making Ōita the top producer of saffron. The quality of Ōita saffron has gained international acclaim as active component levels are several times higher than foreign saffron. Saffron is said to have many benefits including circulation enhancement and is used as a food coloring and natural medicine.

Galingale: Ōita is Japan's top producer of galingale (シチトウ|shichitō), a kind of rush plant, a grass with a distinctive triangular profile, belonging to the family Cyperaceae. It is grown in Kunisaki Peninsula of Ōita Prefecture and is used in the production of Ryukyu-style tatami mats, as it is dust and moisture absorbent and has a pleasant scent.

Madake bamboo: The madake variety of bamboo makes up 60% of Japan's cultivated bamboo, and Ōita is Japan's top producer. It is the most popular variety of bamboo used in handiwork and traditional crafts since it is very flexible and pressure resistant.

Ōita ranks number one in Japan (and second in the world next to America's Yellowstone National Park) for the amount of hot-spring output and geothermal power. Ōita also ranks number one in Japan for the amount of limestone production.

=== Other industries ===
Seki-aji and seki-saba are mackerels that are well-known seafood products of Ōita. Ōita has gained nationwide recognition for their promotion of "The Oita Brand", labeling local products with the prefectural name.

Key Ōita Brand products are as follows:

Agricultural products: tomatoes, leeks, strawberries, scallions, kabosu limes, greenhouse tangerines, prairie gentians (トルコギキョウ, torukogikyō), roses, chrysanthemums, pears (Hita City, Shonai Town in Yufu City and Kokonoe town in Kusu are all production regions for Japanese pears. Oita pears are shipped nationwide, with large distribution quantities throughout Kyushu), and Bungo beef (the Kujū highlands are a perfect feeding ground for cattle and cattle farmers in Oita are involved in breeding and shipping cattle. Bungo beef is a well known local product.).

Forest products: Dried shiitake mushrooms and Oita-style seasoned timber (Oita is one of the leading production centers for Japanese cedar, ranking second in Japan for amount of lumber reserves and number of cedars produced. Oita cedar producers use a special method for drying the wood which combines benefits of natural and artificial drying to produce cedar that has cracks and retains its natural scent and color.)

Marine products: cultured flatfish, cultured yellow jack, cultured yellowtail, cultured loach, pearl, cultured kuruma prawn, natural kuruma prawn (kuruma ebi), cuttlefish, hairtail, butterfish, blue crab, conger eel, clam, and Japanese mitten crab.

Economic development of Ōita was greatly aided by the One Village One Product movement of long-time governor Morihiko Hiramatsu. This movement has gained international attention and increased international exchange activities between Oita and overseas cities and countries.

The following companies operate factories in Oita: Toshiba Corporation, Nippon Steel Corporation, Canon Inc., Texas Instruments Inc., Sony, Daihatsu Motor Co. Ltd., Showa Denko K.K., Kawasumi Laboratories Inc. (川澄化学工業株式会社), CKK, Asahi Kasei Medical Co. Ltd. (旭メディカル), NEC Corporation, Matsushita Electric Industrial Co., Sumitomo Chemical Co. Ltd, Mitsui E&S Corporation.

== Demographics ==
Oita prefecture population pyramid in 2020

As of October 1, 2008, Ōita's total population was 1,201,715. Broken down into age groups, it was determined that 13.3% of the population was between the age of newborn and 14 years old, while 60.6% of the population was between the ages of 15 years and 64 years old, and 25.8% of the population was 65 years old or older.

In 2008, there were 11,034 non-Japanese residents registered in Ōita, that was up 1,684 people from the previous year.

As of December 2009, Ōita was ranked as having the highest number of foreign students relative to population in Japan. Oita has 339.8 foreign students per 100,000 people in the prefecture, where Tokyo, now ranking second has 329.4 foreign students per 100,000 people in the city. This is contributed to the fact that Ritsumeikan Asia-Pacific University (APU) in Beppu accepts many foreign students. As of November 1, 2009, there were 4,160 foreign students in Ōita total, from 101 different countries and territories, with the majority being from Asia (e.g. China and South Korea).

== Culture ==
Oita is in the northeast corner of the island of Kyushu. Its coastal areas, farmland, highland, and mountains lend to a mix of different farming and fishing culture. There are many festivals throughout the year to pray for healthy harvests and abundant crops.

As of May 2006, 146 cultural assets in Ōita were designated by the national government (Agency for Cultural Affairs), four of which are designated as National Treasures. Additionally, the prefecture itself has designated almost 700 traditions, properties, landmarks etc. as cultural assets.

=== National treasures ===
1. Fuki-ji Temple: The only wooden structure in Kyushu to remain intact since the Heian period (794–1192). Fukiji Temple is in Bungotakada.
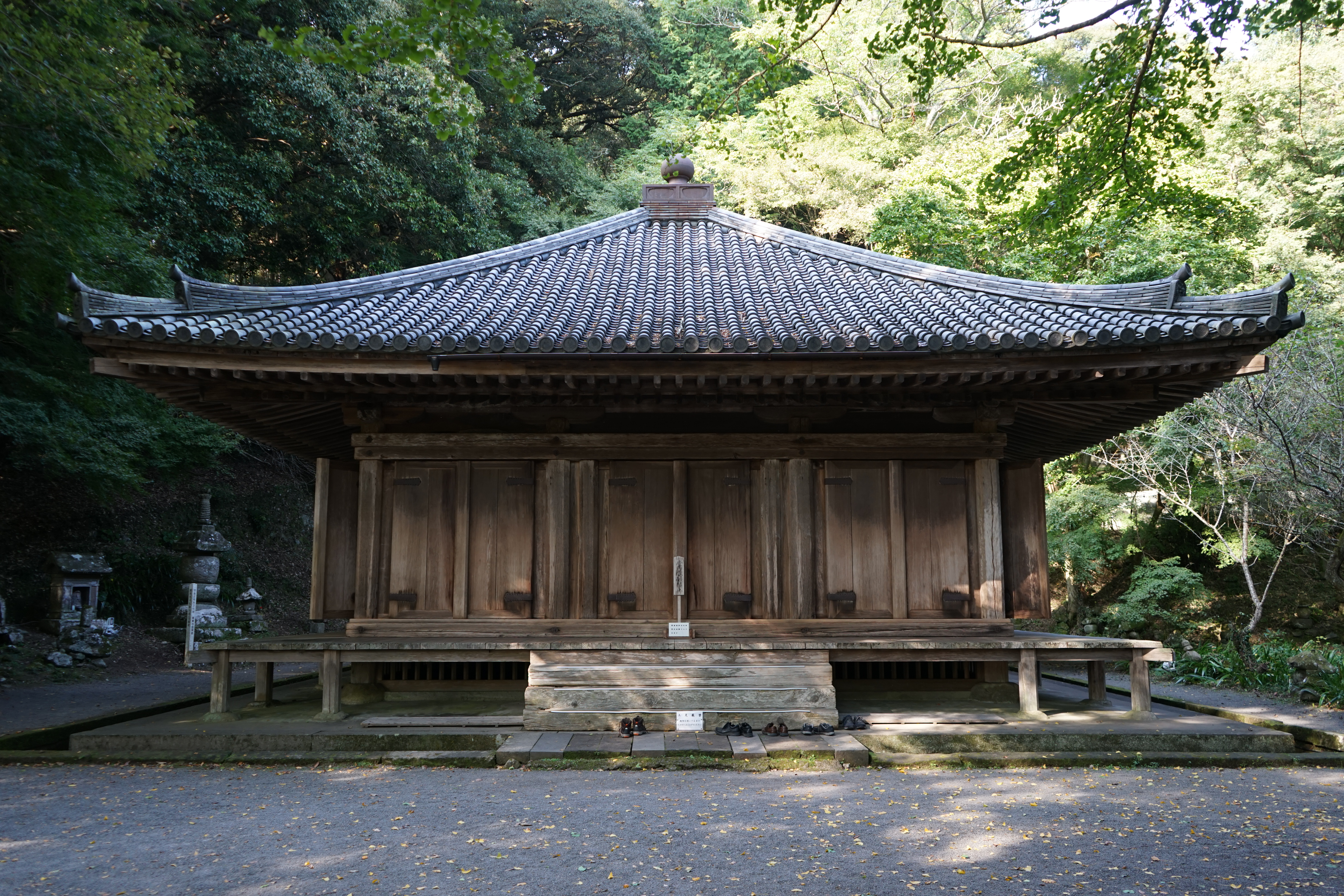
  Fuki-ji's Main Hall
2. The Main Building of Usa Shrine: A building which is said to be a prototype for hachiman style architecture located in Usa City.
3. Peacock Buddhist Altar Fitting: This is a Buddhist altar fitting called Kujaku Monkei with engraved peacocks and an inscription dated 1209. The information on it tells of the relationship between Usa Shrine and the former Mirokuji, a Buddhist temple once connected to the shrine as a jingū-ji.
4. Usuki Stone Buddhas: Approximately 60 cliff carvings of Buddha that were crafted between the Heian period (794–1192) and the Kamakura period (1185–1333) are the only rock carvings of their kind to have received a "National Treasure" designation. They are in Usuki City.
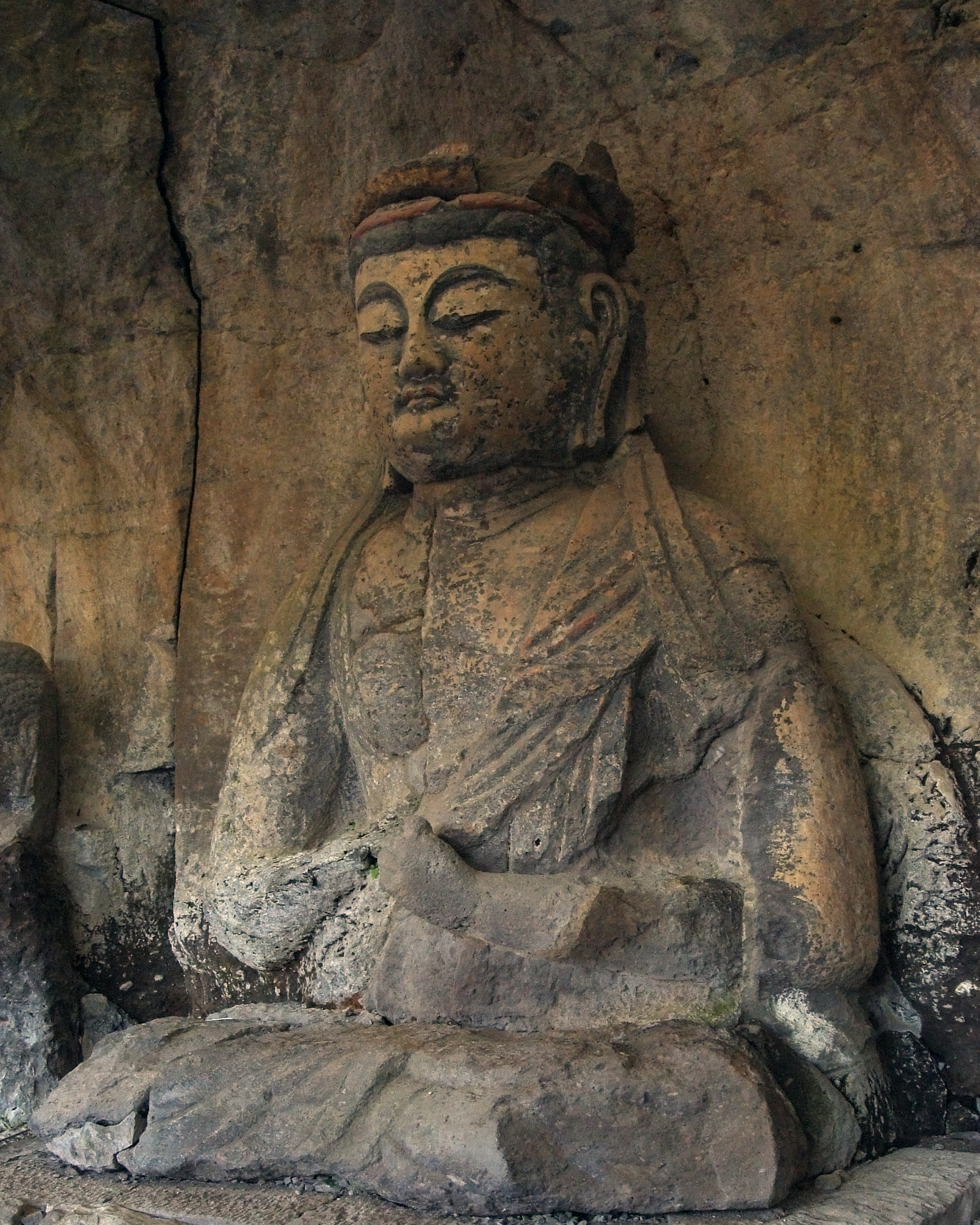
  One of the Usuki Stone Buddhas

Below are some of Oita's cultural traditions that are designated by the Agency for Cultural Affairs as Important Intangible Cultural Properties:

1. Shujo Onie Fire Festival: An event held to pray for national security, health, and longevity on the first day of the Chinese New Year at temples of Tendai Buddhist denomination in the Kunisaki Peninsula area. The three temples that continue to hold this event are the Tennenji-temple (Bungotakata City), Iwatoji-temple (Kunisaki Town) and Jobutsuji-temple (Kunisaki Town).
2. Koyo Shrine Puppet Show: This is a puppet show also known as "Kitabaru Puppet Show" which uses kugutsu puppets that perform dance and sumo wrestling matches. Oita's Hachiman Kohyo Shrine is in Nakatsu City.
3. Hita's Gion Festival: A festival held in Hita City in July with parade floats that are up to 12 meters high. Although the festival only takes place once a year, the magnificent floats are on display year-round at the Gion Festival Float Museum in Kuma Town, Hita City.
4. Yoshihiro Gaku Traditional Performing Art: Dance performed along with traditional song and music in Musashi Town in Kunisaki Peninsula
5. Manufacturing Process of Sulfur "Flowers" at Myoban Hot Spring: Thatched huts at Myoban Hot Spring are used to produce yu-no-hana or sulfur "flowers" which are crystals that develop naturally on the ground around the springs. The manufacturing and collection process of the sulfur flowers has remained largely unchanged since the Edo period and thus the manufacturing process itself is designated as an ethno-cultural asset. The crystals are used as the main component of bath salts sold in Myoban, which are a popular souvenir that is used to help heal skin conditions.

=== Dance ===
Kagura is a sacred dance performed at festivals and celebrations throughout the prefecture.

Shonai kagura is a festive dance that has been practiced for over 200 years and is representative of Oita Prefecture. Another kagura, the Ondake-style Kagura, was nationally designated as an "Important Intangible Folk Cultural Property" in 2007. There is also traditional song and music known as "gaku" that is performed in the Kunisaki Peninsula Area and is accompanied by characteristic dances such as the Yoshihirogaku in Musashi Town. Dancers wear grass skirts and dance with a drum tied to their front and a flag tied to their backs to pray to the Buddhist God Amida Buddha. In the Ono district there are 80 groups of Shishimai or dancers who perform a lion dance with roots based on the Ondake-style dance.

=== Crafts ===
Onta Pottery is the name of a type of stoneware pottery made for everyday usage – typically called 'mingei' (folk art or craft) in Japanese. The community is situated in the Hiko mountain range, about 17 kilometres from the centre of Hita City, and is said to have been established in 1705 to make large wares – lidded jars for pickled vegetables and fruit, water crocks, ash burners, and pouring vessels with small spouts – for local farmhouses. At the time potters were themselves farmers, who produced pots during the 'off season' in agriculture. These they fired in a cooperative kiln (kyōdō noborigama).

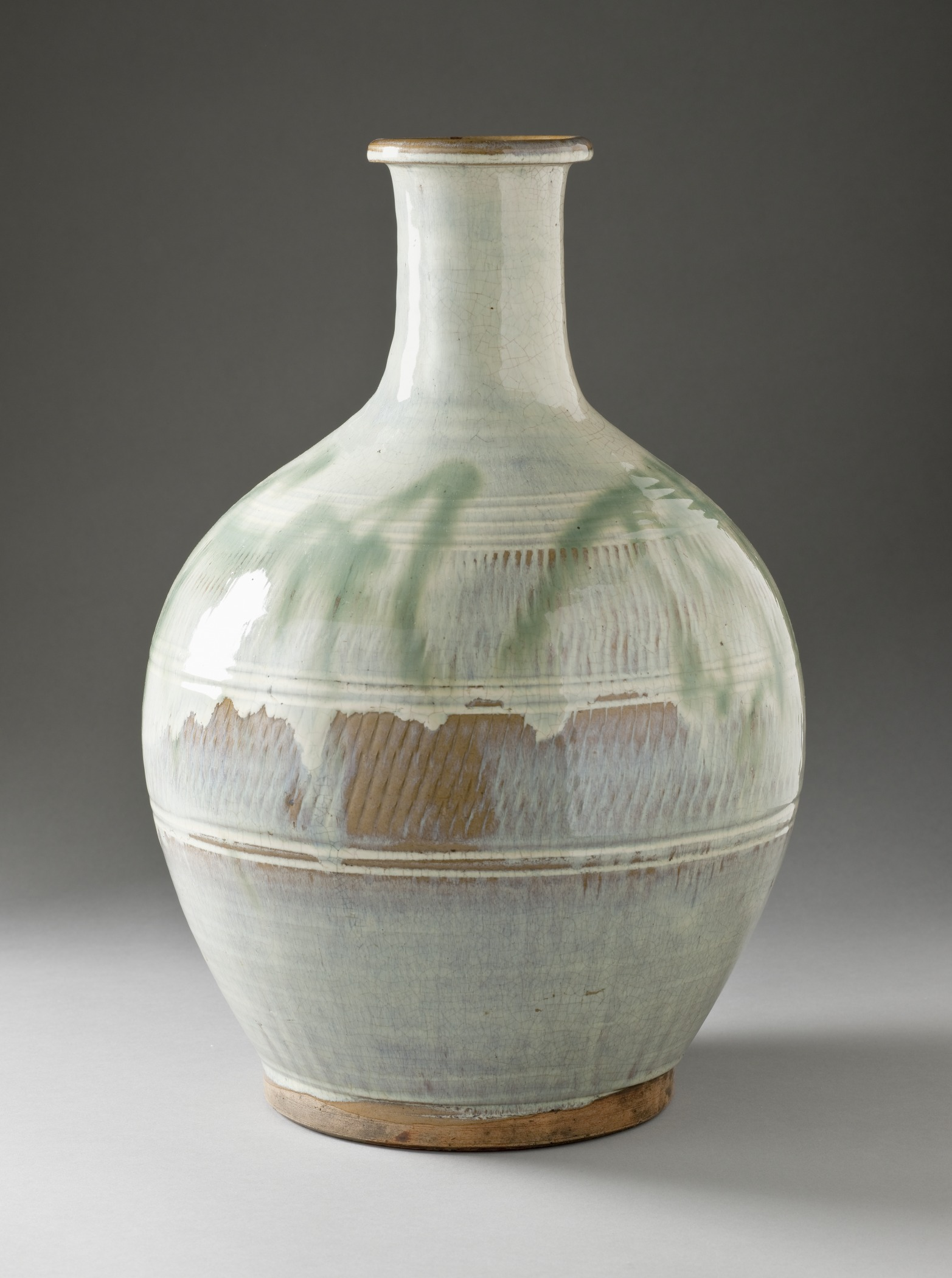
Onta ware tokkuri

Onta pottery is now produced full-time by ten families in Sarayama, five of whom continue to share and fire an eight chambered climbing kiln. The other five households fire independent climbing kilns of four or five chambers, which they fire approximately six times a year. The potters use clays that they dig locally and obtain natural materials (notably, wood ash, rice straw ash, feldspar, iron oxide and, occasionally, copper) with which to mix their glazes. Sarayama is famous for the 'karausu' clay pounders lining its two streams and powered by the water therein. The fact that the clay pounders prepare only enough clay for two people to work with full-time at the wheel has determined both household structure and the number of houses able to take up pottery in Sarayama.

For anything other than small pots, potters use a kick wheel on which to throw their wares, which they decorate typically with hakeme and tobiganna slipware decoration techniques. In April 1995, the Agency for Cultural Affairs announced the designation of Onta Pottery as an "Important Intangible Cultural Property" in 1995. This designation is for the actual techniques used in making the pottery and not the actual pots themselves. Precisely because the designation is for the process rather than the product, it is regarded as an "intangible" property and is the only stoneware pottery-making process so designated in Japan.

Bamboo Crafts were started in the late 14th century to create baskets for travelling goods salesmen. During the Edo period (1600–1868) Beppu thrived as a tourist town and bamboo baskets and goods were used in the daily lives of the local people for everything from cooking to washing in order to meet the demands of the thriving tourist population. The bamboo items soon became a souvenir that tourists purchased to take home and this solidified making Beppu a center for Bamboo crafts production. In 1903 a training center for bamboo workers was established and present-day visitors to Beppu can enjoy learning about the history of bamboo, and hands-on classes at the Beppu City Traditional Bamboo Crafts Center. Festivals using bamboo shoots as candle holders are carried out yearly in the autumn in Usuki, Taketa, and Hita Cities.

=== Religion ===
The Kunisaki Peninsula has been called "Buddha's Village" and many Buddhist statues and temples fill the areas surrounding Bungotakada and Kunisaki. The most notable of these are the Rokugō Manzan (六郷満山) temples. Shinbutsu-shūgō (神仏習合), or the syncretism of Buddhism and Shinto, is said to have begun in this region out of the unique Rokugō Manzan culture.

Usa Jingū in Usa is the head shrine of Hachiman Shrines in Japan. It is said to be the birthplace of mikoshi.

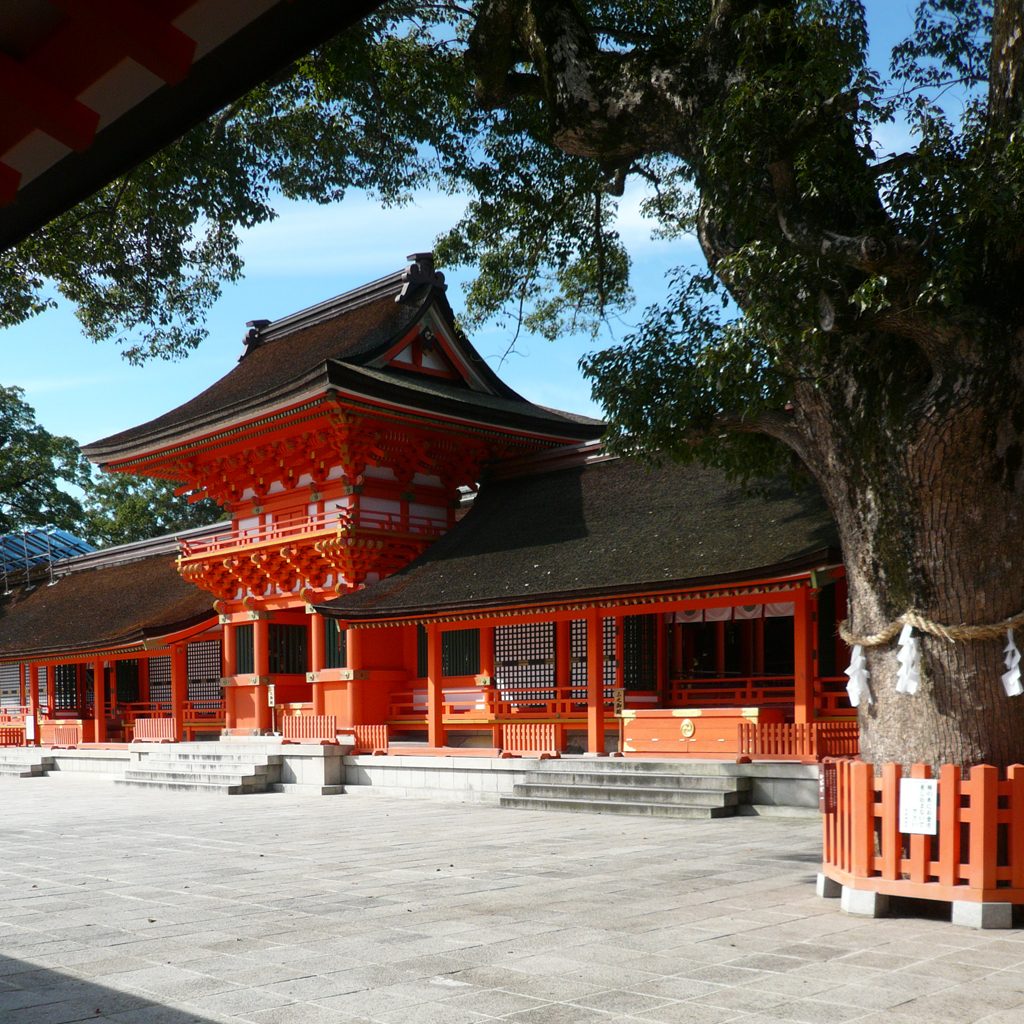
Usa Jingū

Mankoji Temple which was founded in 1352 is a place for practicing zen meditation.

=== Architecture ===
The Agency for Cultural Affairs also designates certain areas for preservation as Groups of Traditional Buildings. The merchant quarter of Hita, Mameda Town, is one of 83 districts (as of April 1, 2009) throughout the country designated as "Important Preservation Districts for Groups of Traditional Buildings". Old samurai residences throughout the prefecture are points of architectural interest. Nioza Historical Road in Usuki is also lined with buildings dating back to the 16th century and also in Usuki the Inaba-Family Villa is a former samurai residence open to the public.

Arata Isozaki is a world-renowned architect who is from Oita. The former Oita Prefectural Library (now Oita Art Plaza) won an award for architectural design in 1967. Other works of his can be found throughout the prefecture including B-con Plaza in Beppu, Bungo-No-Kuni Information Library, the Audio-Visual Center in Oita City, and Yufu Train Station.

=== Music ===
The Martha Argerich music festival "Argerich's Meeting Point in Beppu" is an annual event held in Beppu City. Martha Argerich is the General Director of the festival and the event is supported by a large number of volunteers. It takes place over 10 days and includes recitals and also lessons. This international event welcomes music lovers from all over the world to Beppu.

=== Arts ===
The Oita-Asian Sculpture Exhibition (see external link below) is a biennial event that takes place in Asaji Town in Bungo-Ono City. This exhibition is carried out to commemorate Oita sculptor Asakura Fumio, and to encourage rising artists throughout Asia. Applicants are accepted from within Japan and from several Asian countries. Exhibition winners are given generous prizes and their works are kept on display at the Asakura Fumio Memorial Museum in Bungo-Ono City.

== Sports ==
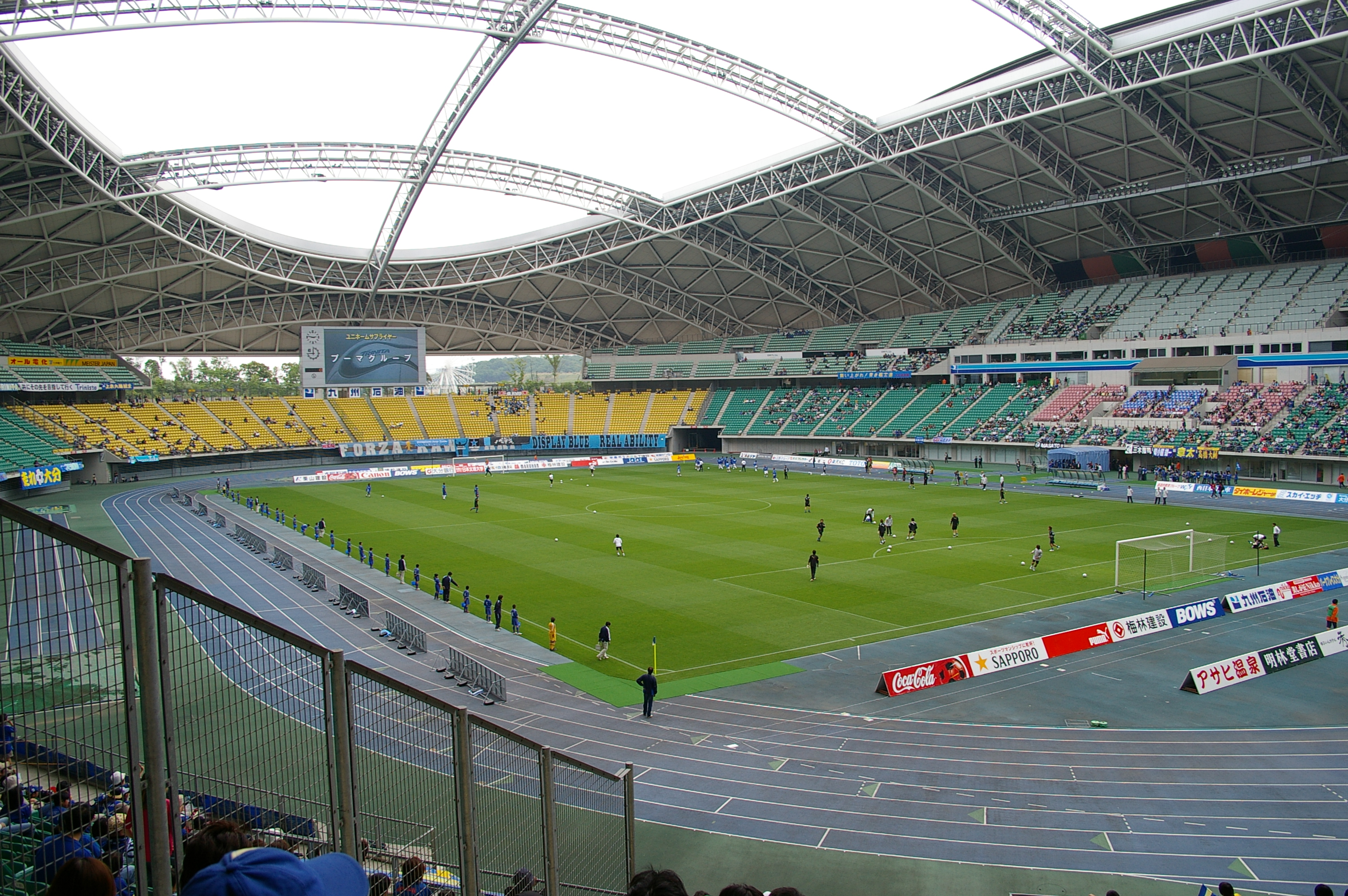
Showa Denko Dome Oita.

The sports teams listed below are based in Oita.

Football (soccer)

- Oita Trinita

Basketball

- Oita Heat Devils (Beppu)

Volleyball

- Oita Miyoshi Weisse Adler (Ōita city)

Futsal

- Vasagey Oita

The Oita International Wheelchair Marathon (see external link below) is a yearly event held in October. This international race gathers wheelchair athletes from all over the world to participate in full and half-marathon racing. It was started in 1981 to commemorate the International Year of Disabled Persons.

== Tourism ==
Ōita Prefecture is famous for its hot springs, particularly those in and around the city of Beppu. The most well-known of Beppu's hot springs are known as the Hells of Beppu. These "hells" are for viewing only and cannot be used for bathing. Beppu also has eight major geothermal hotspots known as Beppu Hattō (別府八湯). Within the city of Beppu, there are more than 150 individual onsen bathing facilities.

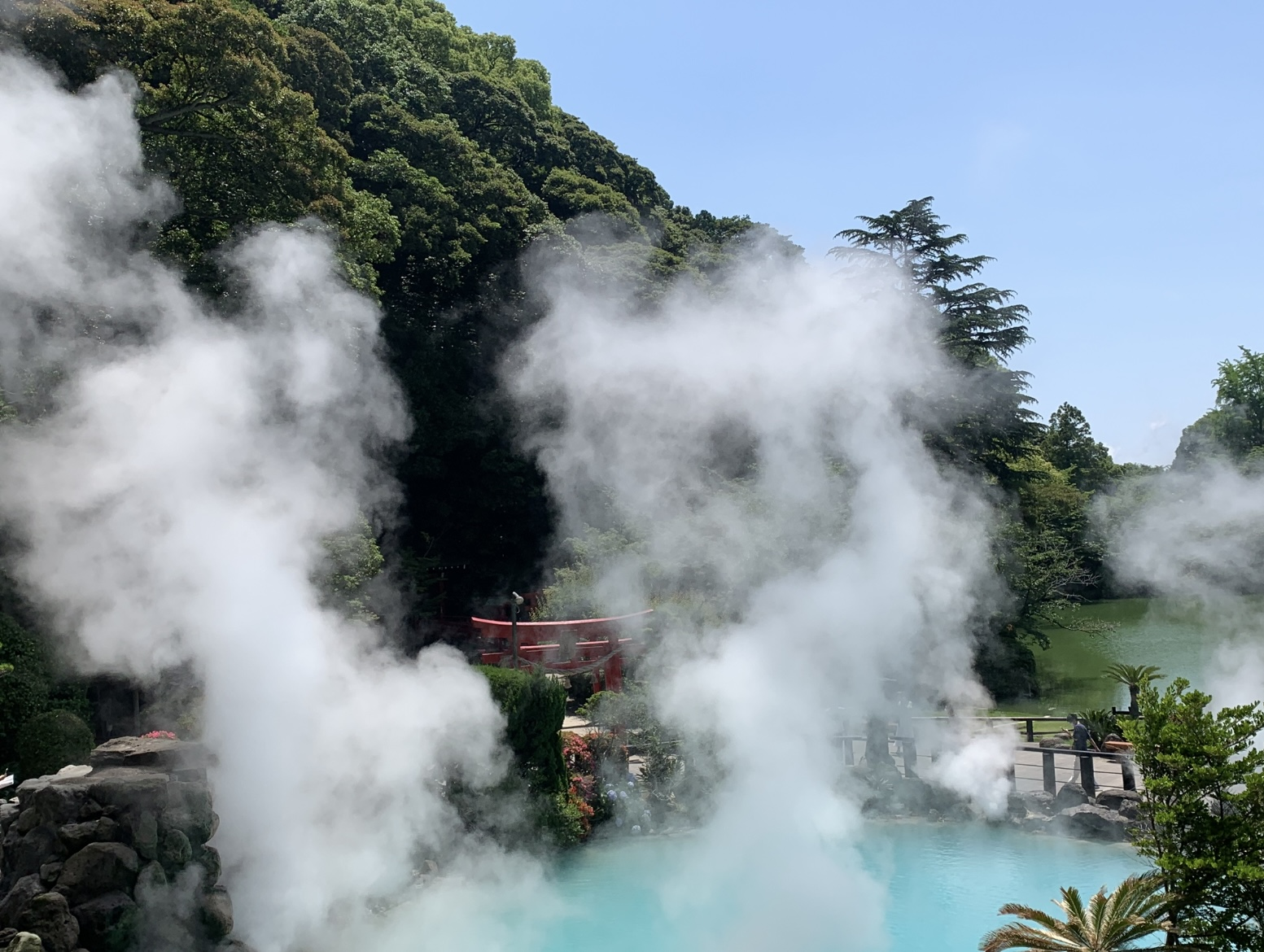
Umi Jigoku (Sea Hell), one of the Beppu Hells

The city's ryokans and public onsen are amply supplied by the same volcanic source. When Chiba University and Tokyo's Institute for Sustainable Energy Policies compiled a list of prefectures meeting demands for reusable energy, Oita ranked number one with a 25.2% rate of self-sufficiency through the use of geothermal energy and hot spring heat.

The city of Beppu is a busy passenger port with regular ferry links through the inland sea to Osaka and several other destinations, and offers a variety of cultural experiences. For instance, the public aquarium "Umi-tamago" on the shoreline outside Beppu features basketballing sea otters, performing archer fish, and puzzle-solving octopuses, along with more naturalistic displays of freshwater and marine fish from around the world.

Also in Beppu, there is the Kijima Kogen Amusement Park (城島高原パーク). In Hiji, there is a Sanrio theme park called Harmonyland (ハーモニーランド).

Yufuin is another popular destination for tourists. It is known for its onsen, shopping streets, ryokan, Mount Yufu (由布岳, Yufudake), and Lake Kinrin (金鱗湖, Kinrin-ko).

The Kunisaki Peninsula is well known for its hiking trails, many mountain valleys, and the temples and Buddhist statues located throughout the area.

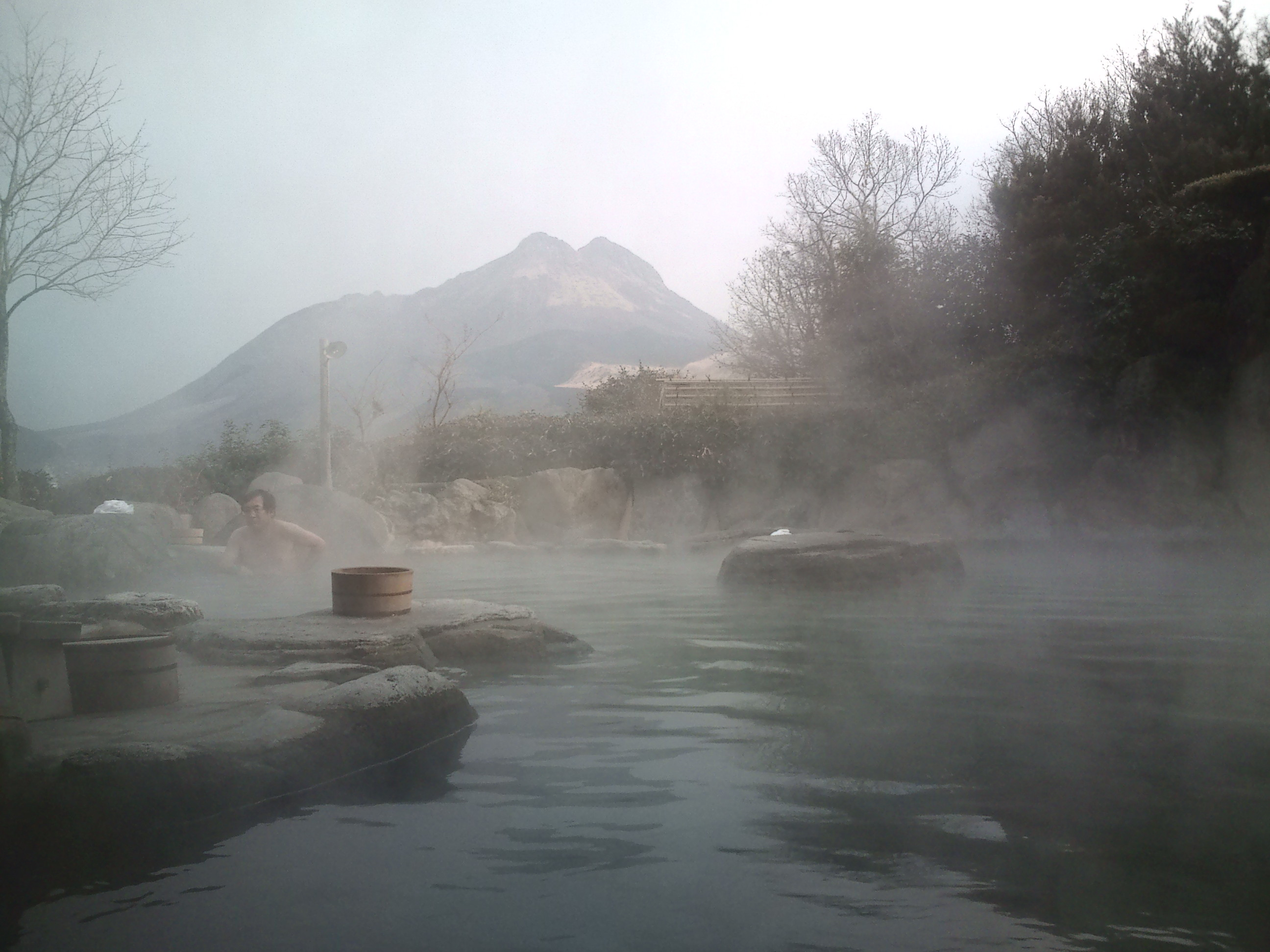
Onsen in Yufuin with a view of Mount Yufu

Another attraction is Mount Takasaki Monkey Park, a park featuring two distinct troupes of wild Japanese macaque monkeys that make regular visits to the feeding grounds. The reserve was initially established to prevent the monkeys from raiding the region's fruit crops, a behavior that brought them into conflict with local farmers. The wild macaques can be observed up close in the park during the feeding sessions.

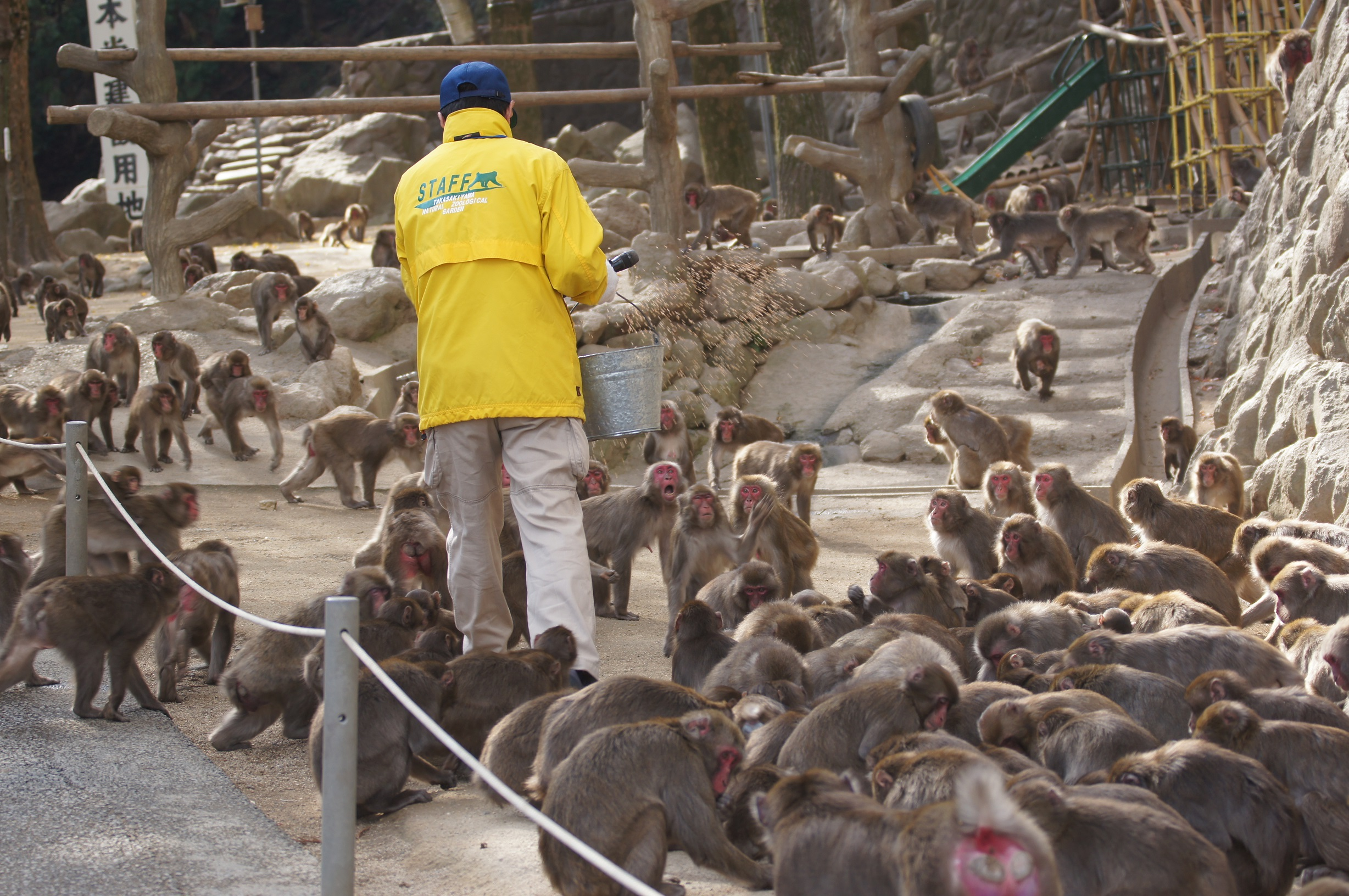
Feeding the monkeys at Mount Takasaki Monkey Park

Previously, Mt. Hachimen in Nakatsu was home to Concert on the Rock, a music festival held as an annual charity event which saw over 30 international acts performing over a weekend in June 2004. The event was held again in 2005 but has since been discontinued.

In 2017, the creators of Pokémon Go held an event from March 4 to 13 featuring newly spawned Pokémon Snorlax for players to check areas hit by the 2016 Kumamoto earthquakes and help support the local economy. A spokeswoman for the company said that the game event would provide many opportunities for players to come and see the sights. The event followed a similar event that spawned the Pokémon Lapras in the Miyagi Prefecture in November 2016 in areas that were severely damaged by the 2011 earthquake.

== Media ==
- Oita Asahi Broadcasting (OAB)
- Oita Broadcasting System (OBS)
- Television Oita System (TOS)

== Transport ==
=== Roads ===
==== Expressways and toll roads ====
- Ōita Expressway
- Higashi Kyushu Expressway
- Usa Beppu Road
- Hinode Bypass
- Naka Kyushu Road

==== National highways ====
- National Highway 10
- National Highway 57
- National Highway 197
- National Highway 210 (Kurume-Hita-Oita)
- National Highway 211 (Hita-Iizuka-Kitakyushu)
- National Highway 212 (Nakatsu-Hita-Aso)
- National Highway 213
- National Highway 217
- National Highway 326
- National Highway 386 (Hita-Asakura-Chikushino)
- National Highway 387
- National Highway 388
- National Highway 442
- National Highway 496
- National Highway 500
- National Highway 502

=== Railroads ===
- JR Kyushu
  - Hitahikosan Line
  - Hōhi Line
  - Kyūdai Line
  - Nippō Main Line

=== Airports ===
- Oita Airport

=== Ports ===
- Beppu Port, ferry route to Osaka, Hiroshima and Yawatahama
- Oita Port, ferry route to Kobe
- Saiki Port, ferry route to Sukumo

=== Hovercraft ===
Ōita is notable for having one of the world's only regularly scheduled hovercraft services, the Oita Hovercraft between Ōita city and Oita Airport.

== Notable people ==
- Ōtomo Sōrin (1530–1587): The Otomo family ruled over the Funai Domain, which is present day Ōita City, in the 16th century. Funai was a very internationalized city which engaged in trade and exchange with other nations. Sōrin, the 21st leader of the Ōtomo clan, embraced Western culture enthusiastically and invited the missionary Francis Xavier to the city to promote Christianity. Sōrin dreamed of creating a Christian nation; he was baptized and given the name "Don Francisco". Sōrin died in Tsukumi.
- Miura Baien (September 1, 1723 – April 9, 1789): A scholar originally known as Susumu but called Baien after the name of his private school where he educated many scholars. Miura developed his own system of logic and wrote many works including his three famous words, Deep Words (玄語, gengo), Redundant Words (贅語, zeigo), and Bold Words (敢語, kango). He also worked in a hospital and had a good knowledge of astronomy. He hand made an astronomical globe that was passed down through many generations. He spent his entire life in Tominaga Village which is the present day area of Aki Town in Kunisaki City. Miura Baien is considered one of Ōita's three sages along with Hoashi Banri and Hirose Tansō.
- Hoashi Banri (帆足万里; February 11, 1778 – July 30, 1852): Miura Baien's pupil who expanded his academic ability into many fields including Confucianism, natural sciences, medicine and language. He taught himself Dutch to reference scientific publications for his eight-volume work Kyuritsu, which was considered the top work of Western natural science in Japan at that time. In 1832 he was made Minister for the Feudal Lord to fix the financial problems of the Hiji clan. Banri Hoashi is considered one of Ōita's three sages along with Miura Baien and Hirose Tansō.
- Hirose Tansō (広瀬淡窓; May 22, 1782 – November 28, 1856): A Confucian scholar, poet and educator from a money-lending family in Hita. Ōita's current governor Katsusada Hirose is a descendant of Tansō Hirose. In Edo period Japan, education was limited to samurai families and the rich. However, Hirose Tansō opened a school called Kangien (咸宜園) meaning "all are welcome" and admitted students regardless of social status, age, or education level. The school's methodology of a "self-administered work-study policy" is said to have had great influence on the modern day education system in Japan. Former Prime Minister Kiyoura Keigo was educated here, with other students who went on to become influential scholars, artists and politicians. The school remains were designated a historical site in 1932 and are a couple blocks from the original Hirose family house, now the Hirose Museum. There, Tansō Hirose and other family members' works are on display, with other original Hirose artifacts, China dolls, tea ceremony utensils and more. Both are in Mameda Town, about a 10-minute walk from Hita Station. Tansō Hirose is considered one of the Oita's three sages along with Miura Baien and Hoashi Banri. An asteroid called 10009 Hirosetanso discovered by the University of Tokyo in 1977 was named after Tansō Hirose.
- Fukuzawa Yukichi (1834–1901): Founded Japan's oldest institute of higher education, Keio University in Tokyo. Fukuzawa Yukichi grew up in the Nakatsu domain and is pictured on the 10,000 yen bill. He was influential in Japan's education system by promoting independence and self-reliance of the Japanese people at his classes as Keio-Gijuku University, known as present day Keio University, originally a school for Western studies. The university now educates in a range of fields and produces influential and prominent alumni.
- Hiroshi Nagahama (born 1970): Veteran anime industry luminary who began his career in 1990 with Madhouse Studio as an animator and went on to direct Mushishi, Detroit Metal City, The Flowers of Evil and The Reflection, as well as serving as art director of Revolutionary Girl Utena.
- Yamamoto Tatsuo, once governor of the Bank of Japan from 1898 to 1903, was from here.
