= Kumaso Province =

Former province of Japan

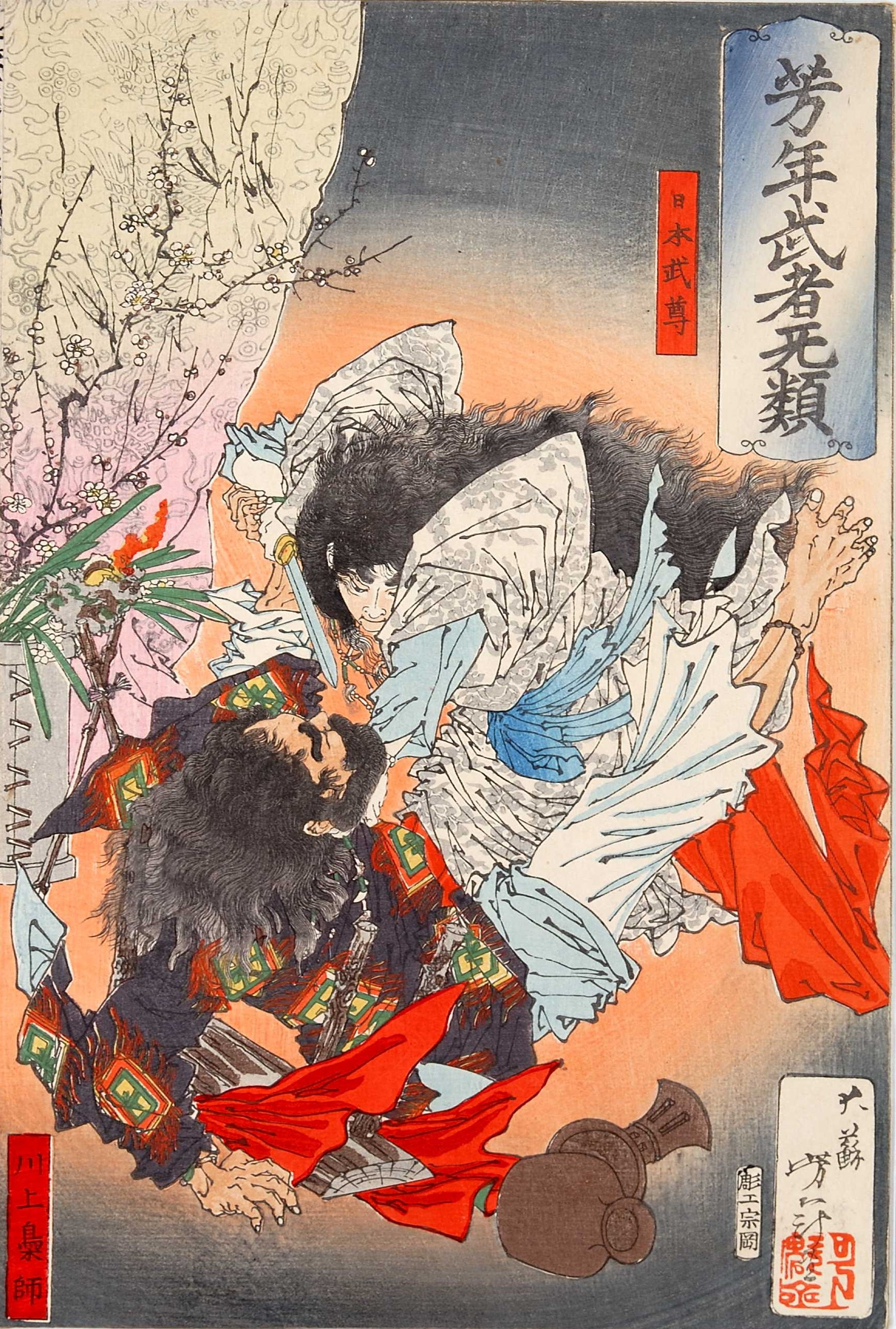
According to legends, Yamato Takeru defeated Marshal Kawakami of Kumaso

Kumaso Province or Land of Kumaso (熊曽国, Kumaso no Kuni; Japanese pronunciation: [kɯꜜ.ma.so (no kɯ.ɲi)]) was the name of Hyūga Province on the island of Kyushu in the Kojiki. Its boundaries are within Miyazaki Prefecture.

== History ==
The land of Kumaso is mentioned in the mythological genesis of the island of Kyushu, and also plays a part in a tale of Yamato Takeru - both recorded in the Kojiki. The history of Komaso started and ended before the Ritsuryō province system was established at the beginning of the 8th century with the Taihō Code.
