= Tsukumi =

Tsukumi 津久見市
- City
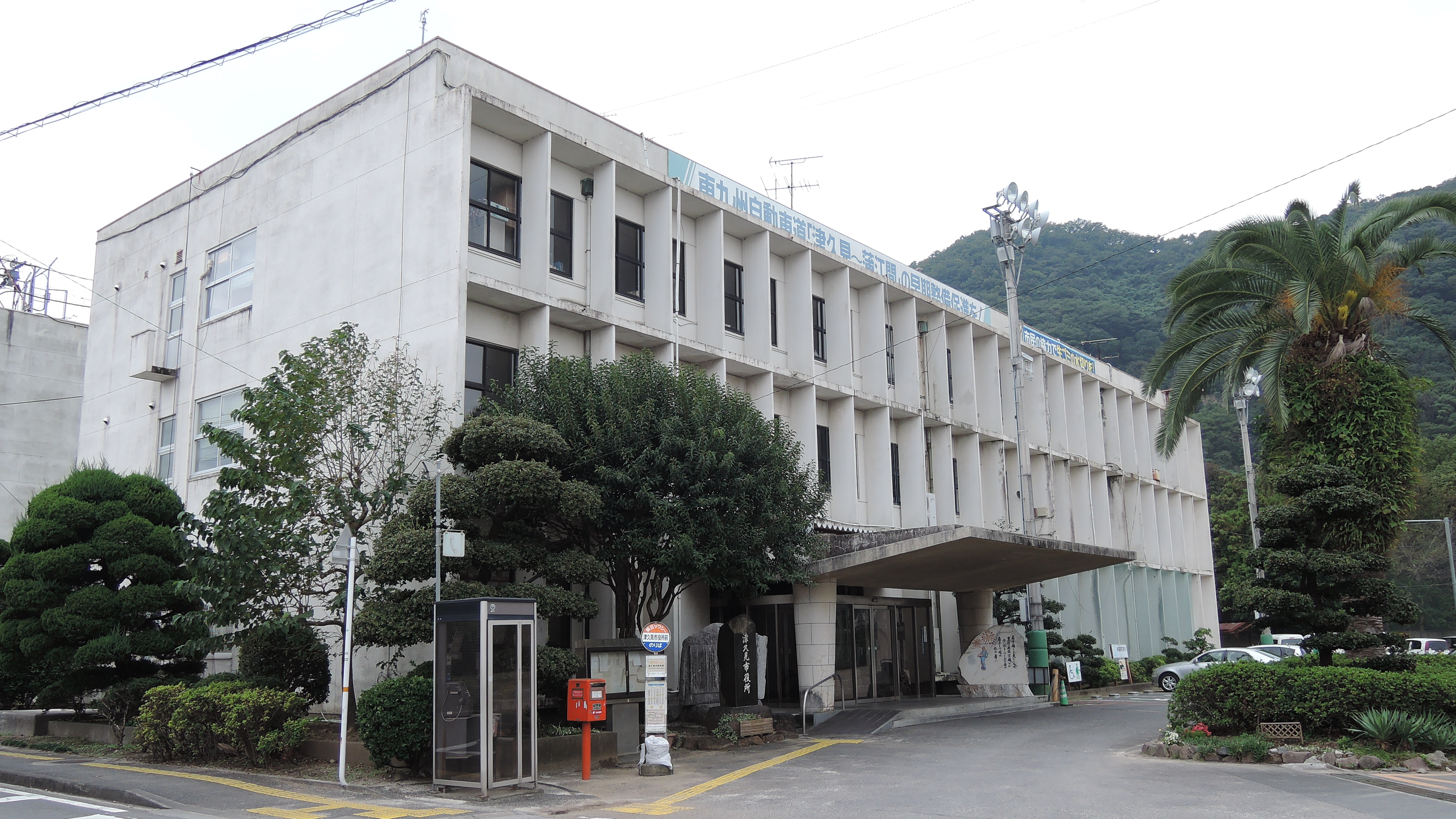
- Tsukumi city hall

- Flag Emblem

- Location of Tsukumi in Ōita Prefecture

- Location in Japan
- Coordinates: 33°4′20″N 131°51′41″E
- Country: Japan
- Region: Kyushu
- Prefecture: Ōita

Government
  - Mayor: Koji Yoshimoto (since December 2003)

Area
  - Total: 79.48 km^{2} (30.69 sq mi)

Population (August 31, 2023)
  - Total: 15,492
  - Density: 194.9/km^{2} (504.8/sq mi)
- Time zone: UTC+09:00 (JST)
- City hall address: Miyamoto-cho 20-15, Tsukumi-shi, Ōita-ken
- Website: Official website
- Symbols
- Flower: Citrus tachibana
- Tree: Quercus phillyraeoioles

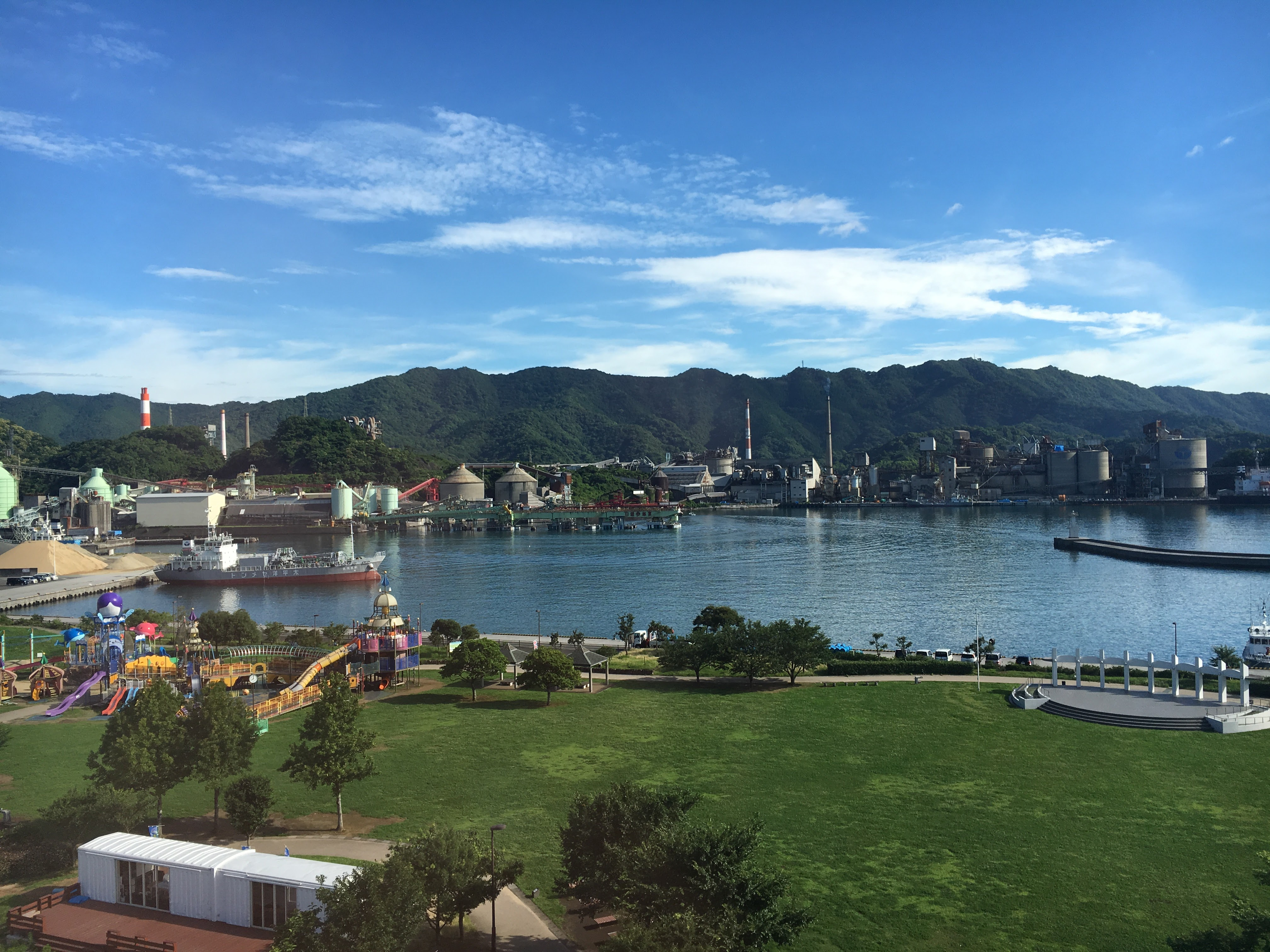
Tsukumi Port and cement plants

Tsukumi (津久見市, Tsukumi-shi) is a city located in Ōita Prefecture, Japan. As of 31 August 2023, the city had an estimated population of 15,492 in 7,666 households, and a population density of 190 persons per km^{2}. The total area of the city is 79.48 km^{2} (30.69 sq mi). Although it has the smallest population among the cities in Ōita Prefecture, it has the third highest population density after Ōita City and Beppu City.

== Geography ==
Tsukumi is located in southeastern Ōita Prefecture, approximately 30 kilometers southeast of the prefectural capital at Ōita City. The eastern side faces the Bungo Channel and surrounds Tsukumi Bay, which is part of the Bungo Channel, from three sides, and the northern half of the Youra Peninsula on the south side of the bay and the southern half of the Nagame Peninsula on the north side.

=== Neighboring municipalities ===
Ōita Prefecture

- Saiki
- Usuki

=== Climate ===
Tsukumi has a humid subtropical climate (Köppen Cfa) characterized by warm summers and cool winters with light to no snowfall. The average annual temperature in Tsukumi is 15.6 °C. The average annual rainfall is 1759 mm with September as the wettest month. The temperatures are highest on average in August, at around 26.1 °C, and lowest in January, at around 5.5 °C.

== Demographics ==
Per Japanese census data, the population of Tsukumi has declined in recent decades.

Historical population
Year	Pop.	±%
1950	29,147	—
1960	37,164	+27.5%
1970	33,988	−8.5%
1980	30,454	−10.4%
1990	26,797	−12.0%
2000	23,164	−13.6%
2010	19,919	−14.0%
2020	16,100	−19.2%

== History ==
The area of Tsukumi was part of ancient Bungo Province. According to legend Emperor Jimmu climbed Mount Suisho in Tsukumi and offered mandarin oranges to the people. Historical records indicate that mandarin oranges were cultivated in the area from around 740 AD. During the Edo period the area was divided between Usuki Domain and Saiki Domain. Following the Meiji restoration, the village of Tsukumi (津組村) within Minamiamabe District, Ōita was established on May 1, 1889 with the creation of the modern municipalities system. It was raised to town status on January 1, 1921, changing the kanji of its name to the present characters. It was raised to city status on April 1, 1951.

== Government ==
Tsukumi has a mayor-council form of government with a directly elected mayor and a unicameral city council of 12 members. Tsukumi contributes one member to the Ōita Prefectural Assembly. In terms of national politics, the city is part of the Ōita 2nd district of the lower house of the Diet of Japan.

== Economy ==
The economy of Tsukumi is center around limestone quarries and cement manufacturing. West of the city is the Todaka Mine, one the biggest limestone quarries in Japan. The limestone is used in the Tsukumi cement plant owned by the Taiheiyo Cement Corporation.

== Education ==
Tsukumi has five public elementary schools and three public junior high schools operated by the city government. The city has one public high school operated by the Ōita Prefectural Board of Education.

== Transportation ==
=== Railways ===
JR Kyushu - Nippō Main Line

- Tsukumi - Hishiro

=== Highways ===
- National Route 217

== Notable people from Tsukumi ==
- Yasuei Yakushiji, former professional boxer
