= Bungo Channel =

Strait between Shikoku and Kyūshū, Japan

- 豊後水道 (Japanese)
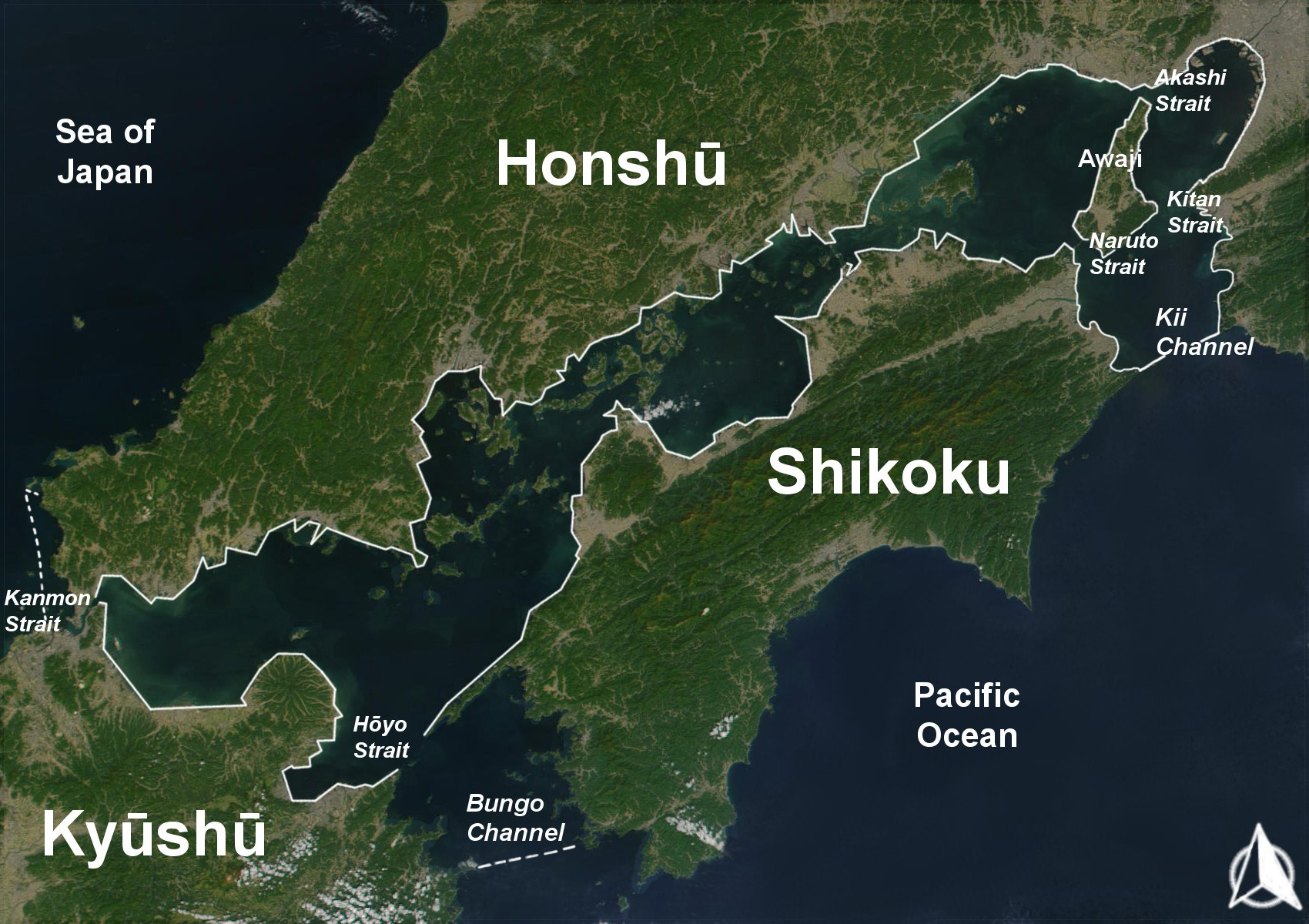
- Bungo Channel Map

- Location of Bungo Channel
- Interactive map of Bungo Channel
- Location: Japan
- Coordinates: 32°54′32″N 132°15′00″E
- Type: Strait
- Basin countries: Japan
- Settlements: Ōita, Uwajima, Seiyo, Sukumo
- References: Bungo Strait: Japan National Geospatial-Intelligence Agency, Bethesda, MD, USA

The Bungo Channel (豊後水道, Bungo-suidō) is a strait separating the Japanese islands of Kyushu and Shikoku. It connects the Philippine Sea and the Seto Inland Sea on the western end of Shikoku. The narrowest part of this channel is the Hōyo Strait.

In the English-speaking world, the Bungo Strait is most known as a setting in the 1958 World War II submarine film Run Silent, Run Deep, based upon the best-selling 1955 novel by then-Commander Edward L. Beach Jr.
