= Rokugō Manzan =

Group of temples and religious culture in Japan

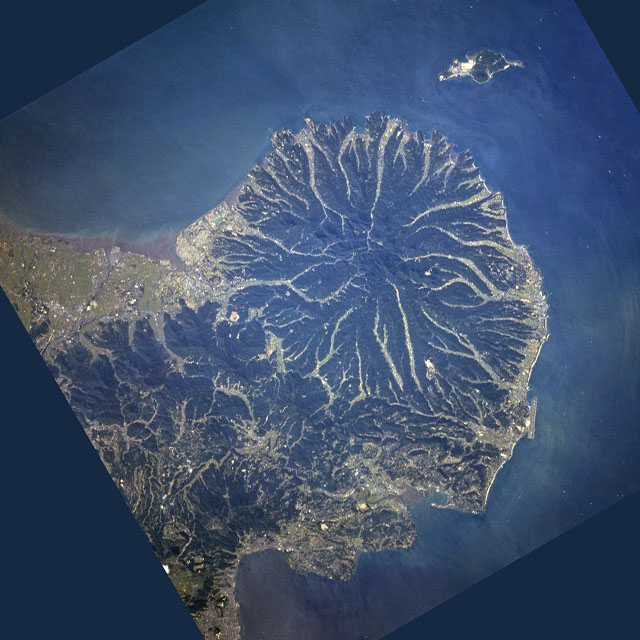
Aerial view of the Kunisaki Peninsula. The mountain valleys in which the Rokugō Manzan culture originated can be seen radiating from Mount Futago at the center of the peninsula.

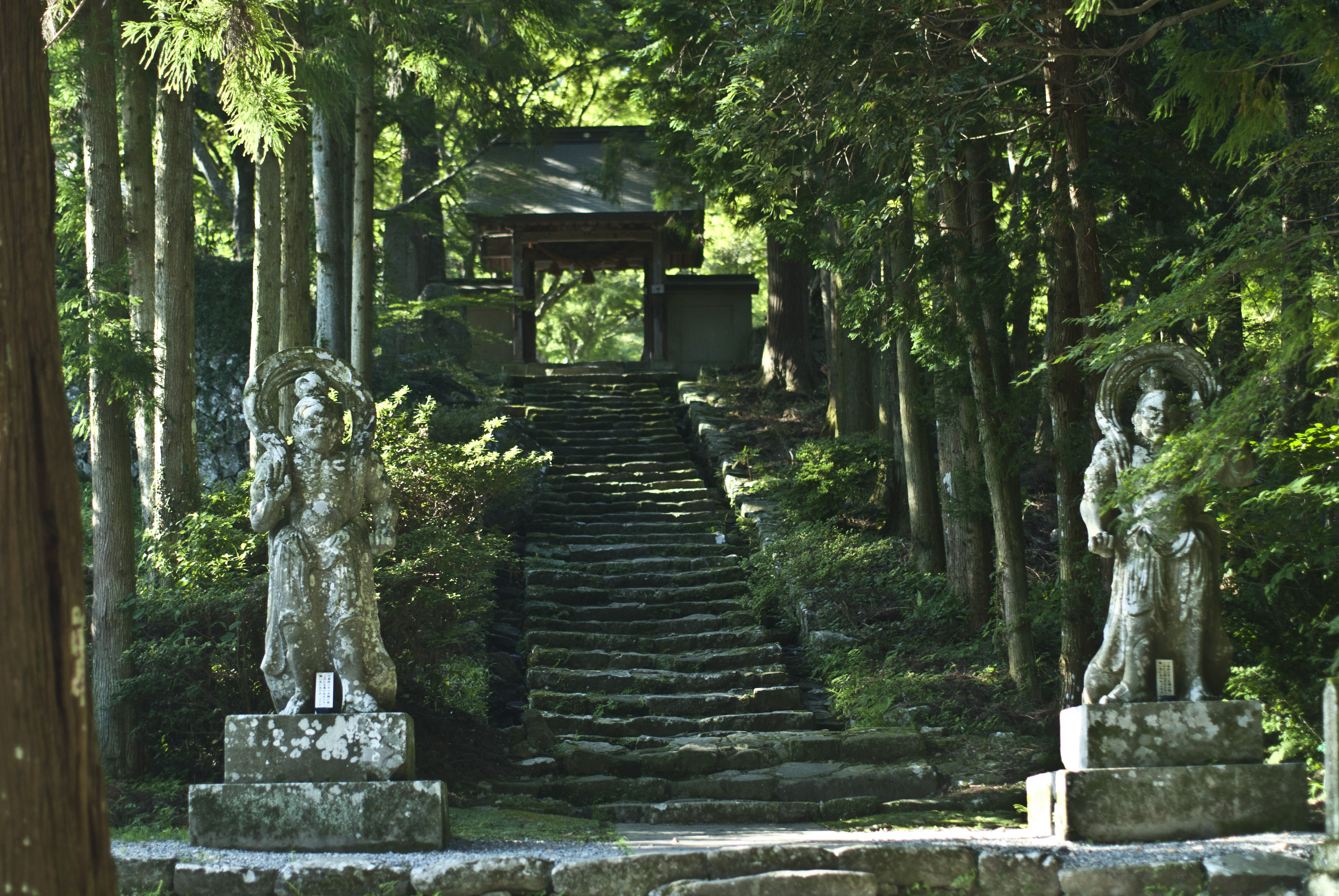
Futago-ji's Nio Guardian Statues

Rokugō Manzan (六郷満山) refers to both a group of temples and a unique religious culture on the Kunisaki Peninsula (国東半島, Kunisaki Hantō) surrounding Mount Futago (両子山, Futago-san) in Ōita Prefecture, Japan. The Rokugō Manzan culture is said to be the birthplace of the syncretism of Shinto and Buddhist elements (Shinbutsu-shūgō, 神仏習合).

== Terminology ==
Rokugō (六郷) refers to the six districts of the Kunisaki Peninsula which existed at the time Rokugō Manzan was formed, the districts being Kinawa, Tasome, Aki, Musashi, Kunisaki, and Imi.

Manzan (満山) is a term used to describe a collection of temples.

When combined, the term Rokugō Manzan (六郷満山) is used to describe both the collection of Tendai sect temples on the Kunisaki Peninsula and the unique religious culture which was born in this region.

== History ==
According to the legend, Ninmon (仁聞), a legendary bodhisattva who is thought to be the incarnation of the deity Hachiman (whose main shrine is located near to the Kunisaki Peninsula at Usa Jingū), traveled to the mountains of Kunisaki to practice Buddhism. It is said that during the Nara period in the year 718, Ninmon established 28 temples and created 69,000 Buddhist statues. The establishment of these temples by Ninmon is said to be the origin of the syncretism of Shinto and Buddhism in Japan (神仏習合, Shinbutsu-shūgō).

Although this story is legendary, the mountain valleys of the Kunisaki Peninsula and the Rokugō Manzan temples, along with the nearby Usa Jingū, are widely believed to be the birthplace of shinbutsu-shūgō. The Rokugō Manzan religious culture has a history of more than 1,300 years with several of the Kunisaki Peninsula's Tendai sect temples being similarly old. How exactly the Rokugō Manzan temples were actually established remains mostly unknown due to a lack of records from the time.

Usa Jingū, located at the base of the Kunisaki Peninsula, played a major role in the origin of shinbutsu-shūgō and has strong historical connections to the Rokugō Manzan temples. It is said to have been the earliest example of jingū-ji, or "mixed shrine-temple complex" with the former Miroku-ji (弥勒寺) having been built on the grounds of Usa Jingū to form Usa Hachimangu-ji (宇佐八幡宮寺).

Shinbutsu-shūgō eventually spread throughout Japan and was prominent until the policies of shinbutsu bunri（神仏分離) were put into effect after the Meiji Restoration. These policies enforced a separation of Shinto and Buddhism, and Miroku-ji along with most Buddhist elements at Usa Jingū were destroyed or removed in accordance. However, many of the influences of shinbutsu-shūgō can still be seen in the many Rokugō Manzan temples.

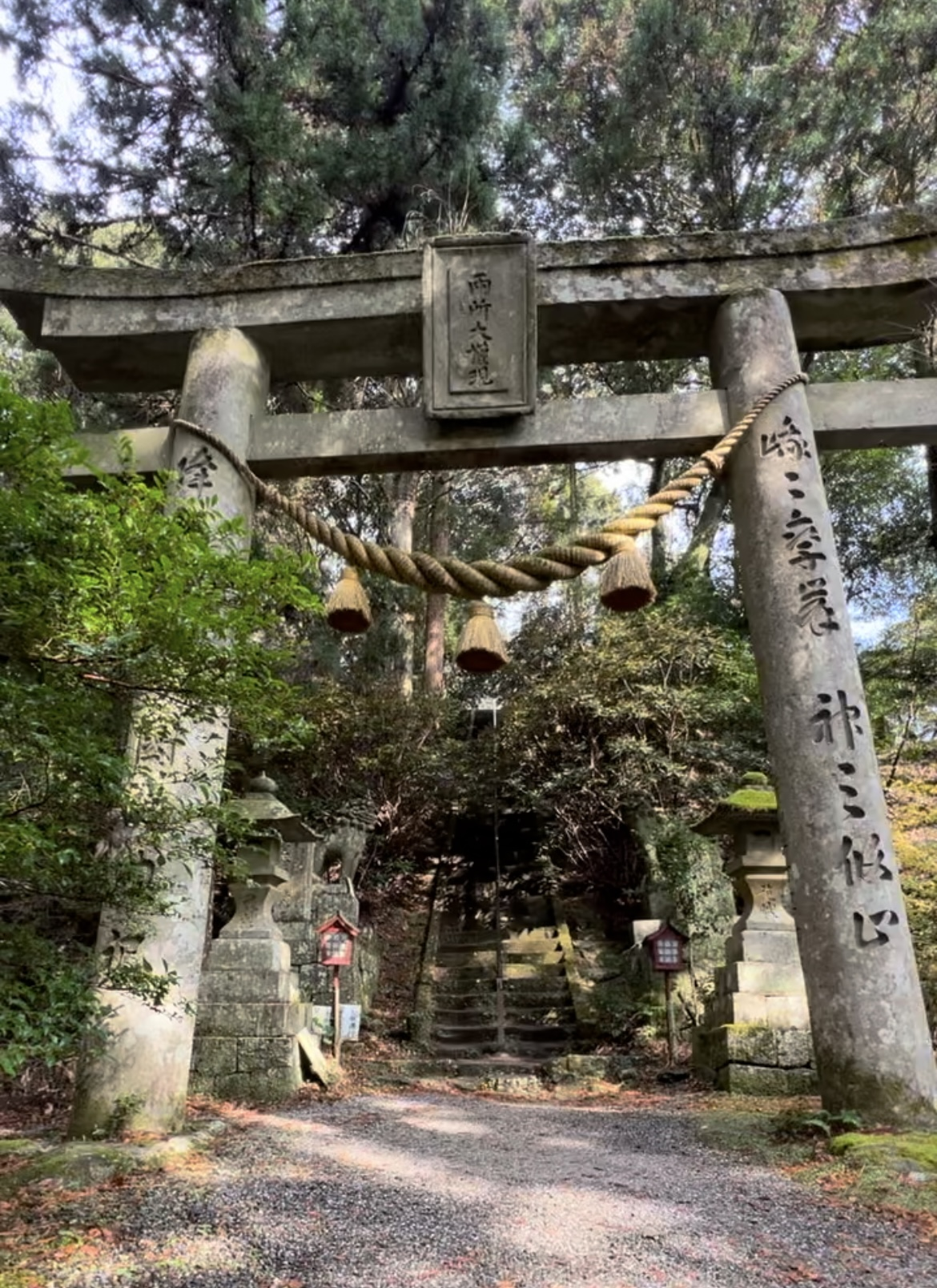
Torii, typically seen at Shinto shrines, at Futago-ji Temple. This is indicative of Rokugō Manzan's mix of Shinto and Buddhist elements.

== Temples ==
The most central of the Rokugō Manzan temples is Futago-ji (両子寺）which is more than 1,300 years old and is located on Mount Futago. Other important Rokugō Manzan Buddhist temples and sites in the area include:

- Fuki-ji（富貴寺) - a temple which, dating back to the Heian period, is the oldest wooden building in Kyushu.
- Kumano Magaibutsu (熊野磨崖仏) - statues which are the largest Buddhist stone carvings in Japan.
- Maki Ōdō (真木大堂) - a temple which contains National Treasure statues of Amida Buddha.
- Monjusen-ji (文殊仙寺) - which is the oldest temple in Kunisaki and is dedicated to Amitabha.
- Iwato-ji (岩戸寺) - where Shujo Onie, a fire festival with oni is sometimes held.
- Senpuku-ji (泉福寺) - a zazen temple of the Sōtō sect (most Rokugō Manzan temples are part of the Tendai sect).
- Kōdō-ji (興導寺) - a temple said to have been founded by Kūya.

=== Full list ===
The full list of all 28 temples is as follows.

8 upper temples (本山本寺) (southwestern area):

1. Kongō-ji (後山金剛寺)
2. Reiki-ji (吉水山霊亀寺)
3. Hōon-ji (大折山報恩寺)
4. Jingū-ji (鞍懸山神宮寺)
5. Suigetsu-ji (津波戸山水月寺)
6. Kōzan-ji (西叡山高山寺)
7. Chion-ji (良薬山智恩寺)
8. Denjō-ji (馬城山伝乗寺)

10 central temples (中山本寺) (central area):

1. Futago-ji (足曳山両子寺)
2. Tennen-ji (長岩屋山天念寺)
3. Chōan-ji (金剛山長安寺)
4. Michiwaki-dera (加礼川山道脇寺)
5. Gokoku-ji (久米山護国寺)
6. Honshōbō (本松房) (formerly 黒土石屋)
7. Mudō-ji (小岩屋山無動寺)
8. Ōreki-ji (大岩屋山応暦寺)
9. Sento-ji (補陀落山千燈寺)
10. Tōkō-ji (横城山東光寺)

10 lower temples (末山本寺) (northeastern area):

1. Tōkō-ji (見地山東光寺) (not the same as above)
2. Jingū-ji (大巌山神宮寺)
3. Iwato-ji (石立山岩戸寺)
4. Monjusen-ji (峨嵋山文殊仙寺)
5. Reisen-ji (夷山霊仙寺)
6. Hōmei-ji (小城山宝命寺)
7. Jōbutsu-ji (龍華山成仏寺)
8. Gyōnyū-ji (参社山行入寺)
9. Seijōkō-ji (西方山清浄光寺)
10. Seigan-ji (懸樋山清巌寺)

== See also ==
- Kumano Magaibutsu
