= Futago-ji =

Coordinates: 33°34′26.4″N 131°36′11.6″E

Futago-ji 両子寺
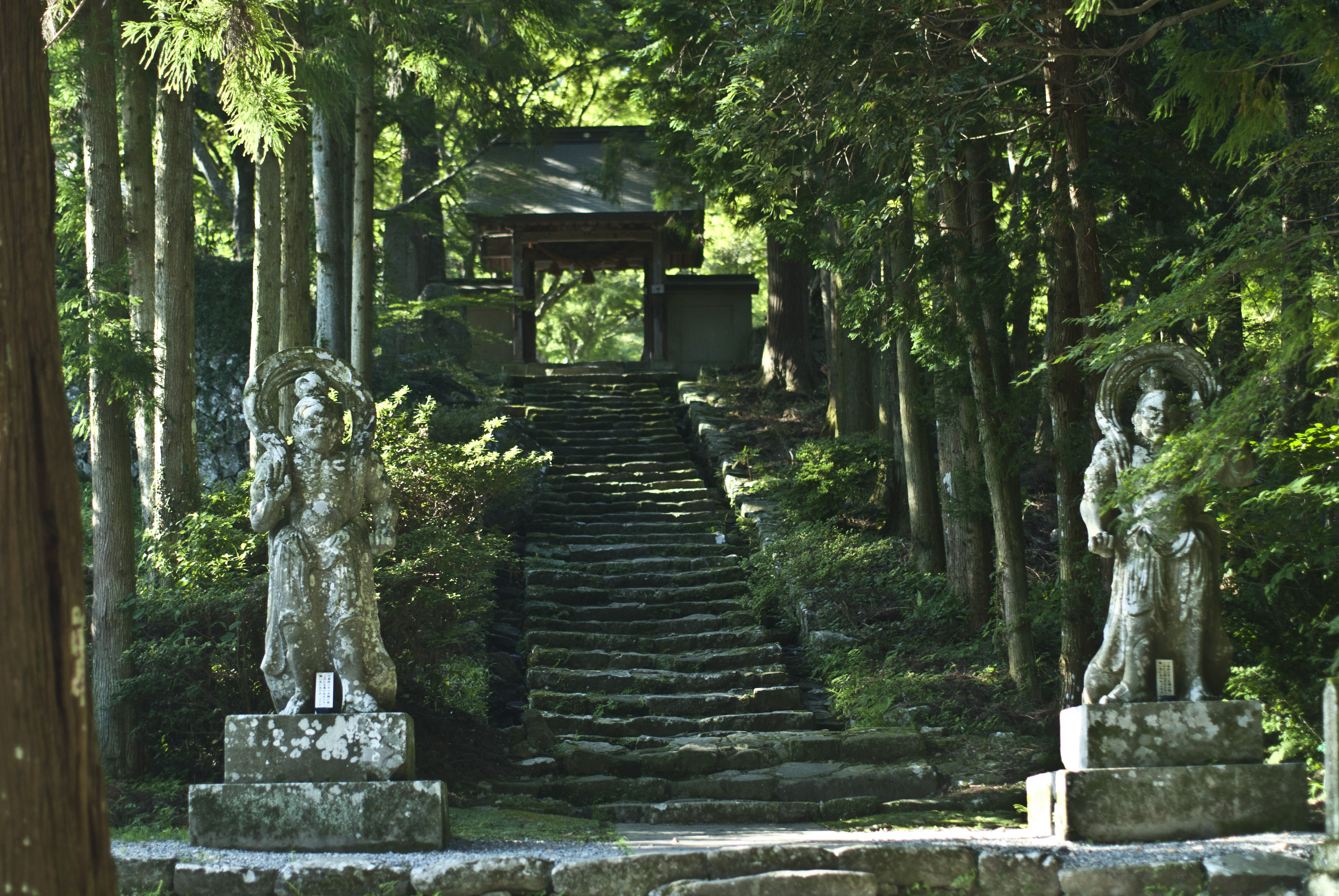
- Stone Niō (1814) at the entrance to Futago-ji

Religion
- Affiliation: Tendai

Location
- Location: Kunisaki, Ōita
- Country: Japan
- Interactive map of Futago-ji 両子寺

Architecture
- Founder: Ninmon
- Completed: 718

Website
- www.futagoji.jp

Futago-ji (両子寺) is a Tendai Buddhist temple in Kunisaki, Ōita Prefecture, Japan. It is located on the slopes of Mount Futago (両子山, Futagosan), the highest mountain on the Kunisaki Peninsula. The temple is said to have been established in 718 by Ninmon (仁聞), a legendary monk, and became the central temple of the Rokugō Manzan (六郷満山) temples. The Rokugō Manzan culture is said to be the origin of Shinbutsu-shūgō, or the syncretism of Buddhism and Shinto. As such, both Shinto and Buddhist elements can be seen at Futago-ji.

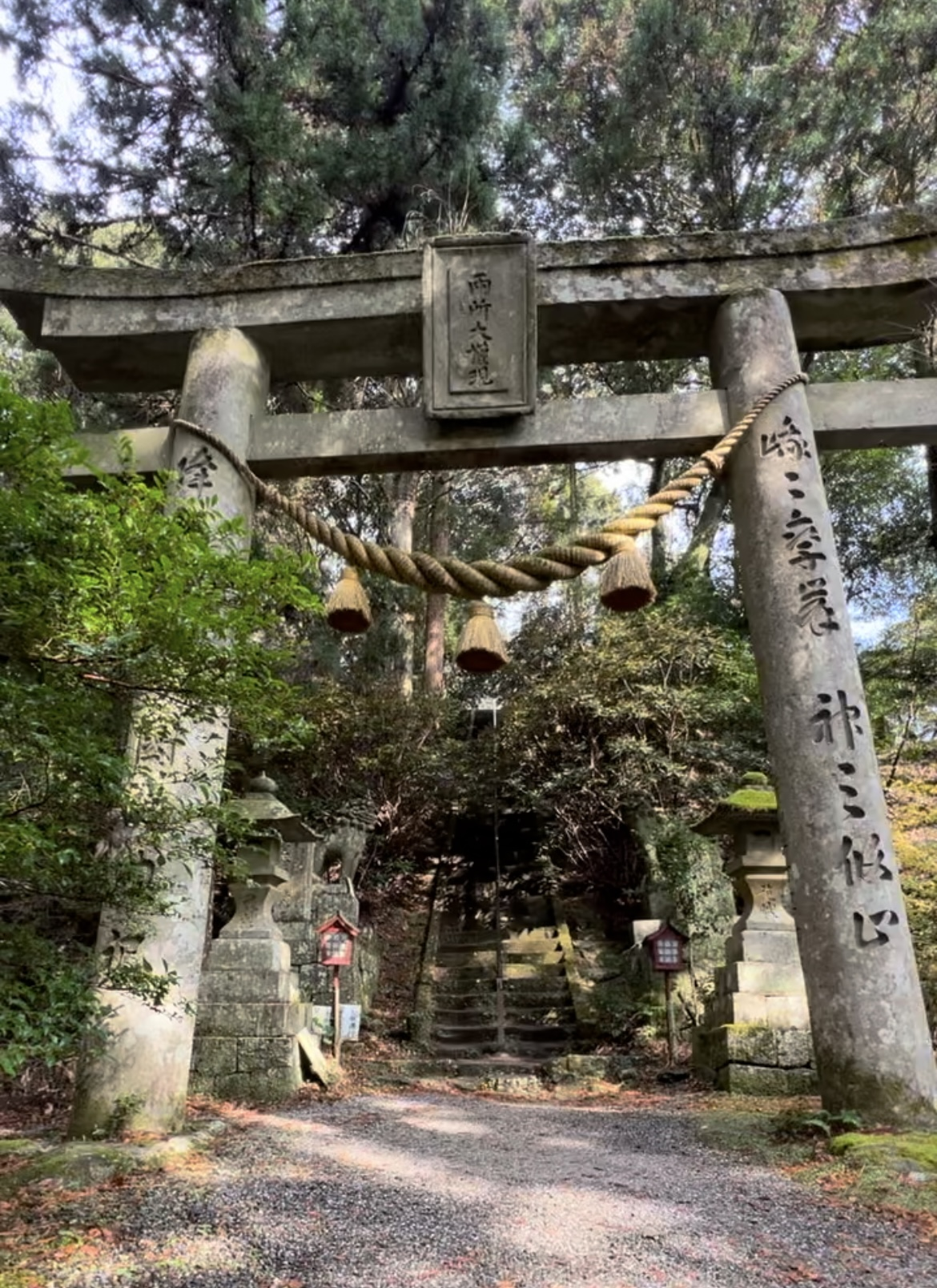
Torii, typically seen at Shinto shrines, at Futago-ji. This is indicative of the temple's history of being influenced by both Shinto and Buddhist elements.

The temple precincts are a Prefectural Historic Site included within a Special Zone of the Setonaikai National Park.

== Treasures ==
- Seated wooden statue of Amida Nyorai (late Kamakura period) (Prefectural Cultural Property)
- Stone tō (Kamakura period) (Prefectural Cultural Property)
- Pair of wooden masks (1618, 1770) (Prefectural Cultural Property)
- Stone tō (Nanbokuchō/Muromachi period) (City Cultural Property)
- Stone tō (1468) (City Cultural Property)
- Stone tō (Muromachi period) (City Cultural Property)
- Stone Niō (1814), 245 and 230 cm (City Cultural Property)
- Wooden statue of Jūichimen Kannon
- Wooden statue of Fudō Myōō
- Raigō painting

== See also ==
- Fuki-ji
- Maki Ōdō
- Kumano magaibutsu
