= Ōita Prefectural Museum of History =

History museum in Usa, Japan

Coordinates: 33°32′33″N 131°21′55.6″E

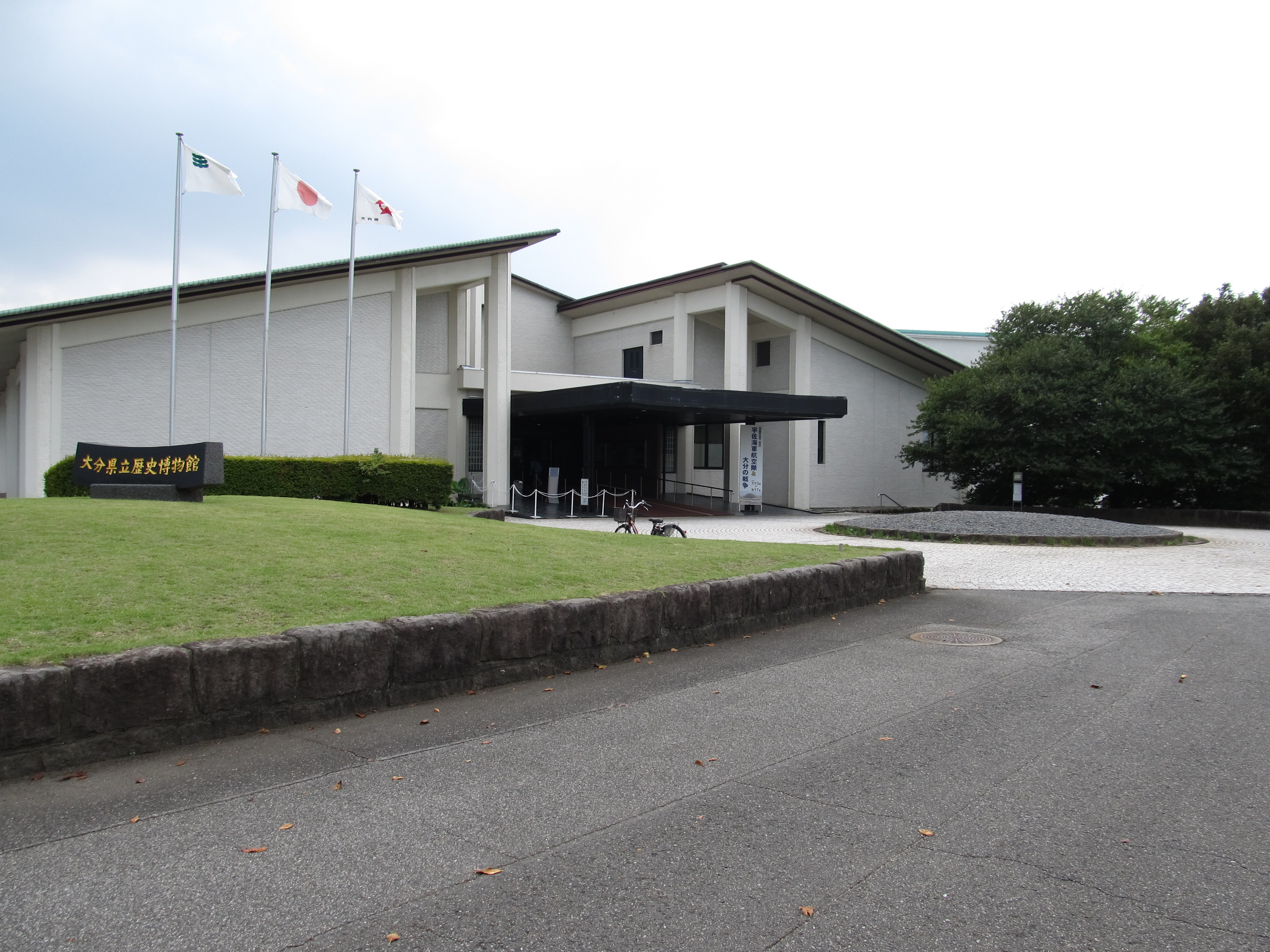
Ōita Prefectural Museum of History

The Ōita Prefectural Museum of History (大分県立歴史博物館, Ōita kenritsu rekishi hakubutsukan) opened in Usa, Ōita Prefecture, Japan in 1998, replacing the Usa Fudoki-no-Oka (宇佐風土記の丘) of 1981. It is one of Japan's many museums which are supported by a prefecture.

The collection is organised around themes including life and ancient Buddhism in Toyo no kuni and the Kunisaki peninsula, and the culture of Usa Hachiman-gū and Fuki-ji.

== See also ==
- Usa Hachiman-gū
- Fuki-ji
- Prefectural museum
