= Miura Baien =

Miura Baien 三浦梅園
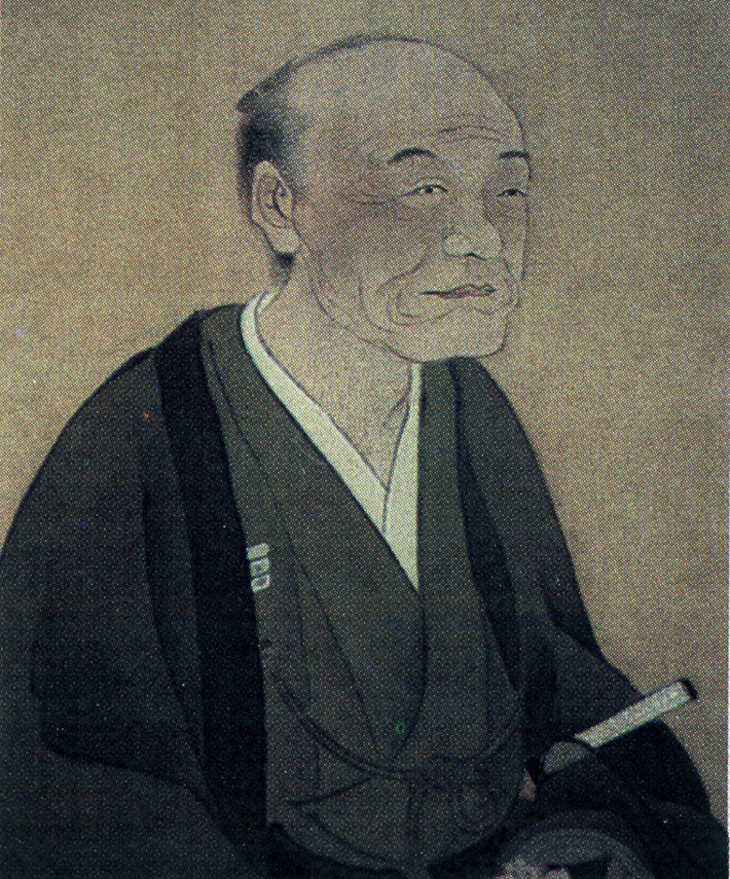
- Born: September 1, 1723; Aki, Bungo Province, Japan
- Died: April 9, 1789 (aged 65); Aki, Japan

Philosophical work
- Region: Japanese philosophy, East Asian Intellectual thought
- Main interests: Natural philosophy, Epistemology, Scientific method, Ethics, Symmetry
- Notable ideas: jorigaku

In Japanese names here, surname is first. "Baien" was a pen-name, "plum garden".

Miura Baien (三浦 梅園; September 1, 1723 – April 9, 1789) was a physician, natural philosopher and scholar in mid-Edo Period Japan. He is known as one of the "Three Wise Men of Bungo", along with Banri Hoashi and Hirose Tansō.

== Biography ==
Miura Baien was born into the family of a village physician in Bungo Province on the island of Kyūshū, in what is now the Aki neighborhood of the city of Kunisaki, Ōita Prefecture. He trained to become a doctor from the age of 16, and went to study medicine at Nagasaki at the age of 23. When he was 28, he made a pilgrimage to the Ise Grand Shrine, and after returning to Nagasaki for a period, settled back in his home town of Kunisaki. He refused repeated invitations to take office in the service of various local daimyō, preferring to develop his own school of philosophy and academic system, writing on a wide variety of topics ranging from medicine, poetics, social and economic history and critical theory. His writing drew on many sources as well, ranging from the Chinese classics to Western astronomical theory, Japanese Neo-Confucianism, Daoism, Buddhist texts and other works such as the writings of Tao Hongjing. Complex and enigmatic, his philosophical work fell into obscurity after his death until the two volumes of Baien Zenshū were published in 1912. They received little attention apart from the 1953 publication of Saegusa Hiroto's Miura Baien Shū. In 1975 the Baien Gakkai was established under the Chairmanship of Ogawa Haruhisa (小川 晴久) of Tokyo University, editor of the annual journal of the Baien Gakkai. Since then conferences have been held annually.

== Miura Baien former residence ==
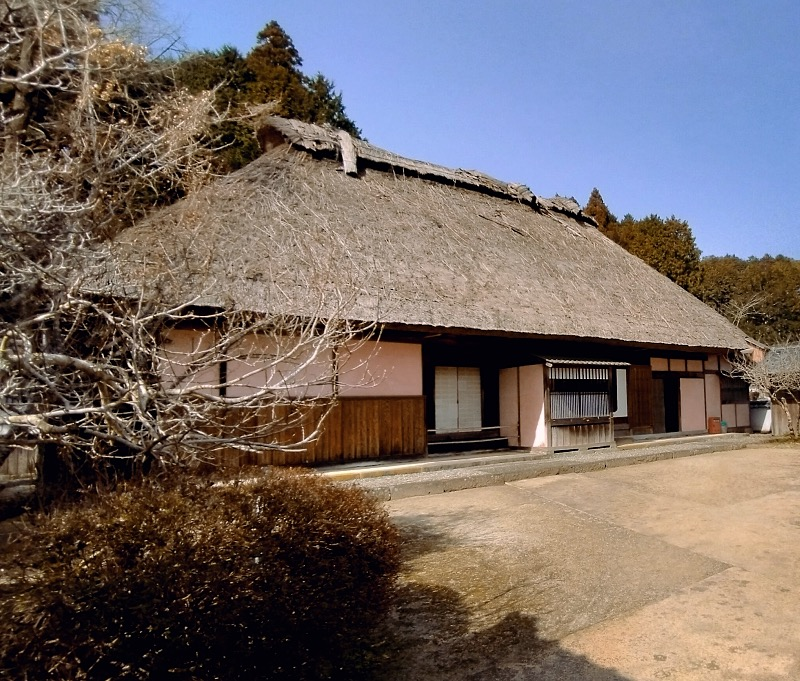
Miura Baien former residence

The former residence of Miura Baien has been preserved as a National Historic Site since 1959. This house was designed and built by Miura Baien himself in 1775, and he lived there for the last ten years of his life. The house is located on the right bank of a river flowing south, facing east on a gentle slope. The building is a one-story thatched house with a narrow garden, room with an earth floor on the right, a parlor living room on the left, and an entrance. Adjacent to this south is a rectangular flat area that is one step higher and extends from north to south. This is the ruins of his academy school, with a low stone wall, stone floor, and well. Further south of the academy ruins is the family cemetery on a small hill, where his grave is located. Approximately 189 square meters in area, the house is now maintained as the "Miura Baien Museum", and contains an observatory, a plum garden, etc., as well as a large collection of handwritten manuscripts. Items in storage include a world map drawn in the Mercator projection (in Miura Baien's own handwriting), and star maps of the southern and northern hemispheres.

== Works ==
Baien wrote in many fields. His major work was Gengo ("Abstruse Talk", or "Deep Words"), one of his three "Go", namely: Gengo, Kango (Daring Words) and Zeigo (Random Words).

Gengo was constantly revised and rewritten over a period of 23 years. It is a systemic study of nature. He used the term "jōri" with a unique meaning for the principle by which nature is organised. He laid out his system using a lexicon of over 200 new terms. These were created by an ingenious method of pairing kanji (Chinese characters) so that they take their meaning from each other while retaining an element of their ordinary language meanings. The text is accompanied by numerous diagrams.

== References in English ==
De Bary, ed. Sources of Japanese Tradition, Vol. 1, 1958, pp. 489–496.

De Bary et al., eds. Sources of Japanese Tradition, Vol. 2, 2005, pp. 424–431.

Heisig, Kasulis and Mraldo, eds. Japanese Philosophy: a Sourcebook, Honolulu, 2011, pp. 441–6.

Mercer, Rosemary, Deep Words, Leiden, 1991.

Mercer, Rosemary: Picturing the Universe, in Philosophy East and West, Vol 48, 3, 1998.

Mercer, Rosemary: Miura Baien Reader, eBook, 2016.

== English translations ==
Genkiron, 1753: in Deep Words.

Letter to Asada Gōryū, 1763 in Mercer: Before Our Very Eyes, PhD thesis, 1994, and Miura Baien Reader.

Kagen, (Origin of Price), 1773: in Miura Baien Reader.

Gengo Honsō, (Core text) 1775: in Deep Words and Miura Baien Reader.

Gengo Reiji (Remarks) 1775: in Before Our Very Eyes and Miura Baien Reader.

Letter to Yumisaki Yoshitada, 1776: in Before Our Very Eyes and Miura Baien Reader.

Letter to Kō Takaoki, 1776: in Before Our Very Eyes and Miura Baien Reader.

Reply to Taga Bokkei, 1777: in Deep Words.

Samidaresho, "Musings in the Summer Rain", 1784: in Hurvitz, Leon, Monumenta Nipponica, 8 and 9.

Letter to Asada Gōryū, 1785: in Before Our Very Eyes and Miura Baien Reader.

== Key sources in Japanese ==
Iwami Teruhiko (岩見輝彦著): Miura Baien no Seishū no Gaku, Kyūkoshoin, 1990.

Ogawa Haruhisa: Miura Baien no Sekai, Kodensha, 1989.

Shimada Kenji and Taguchi Masaharu (島田虔次, 田口正治): "Miura Baien", Nihon Shisō Taikei 41, Iwanami 1982. (Complete Gengo text, both in the original kanbun and a wabun version).

Takahashi Masayasu (高橋正和): Miura Baien no Shisō, Perikansha, 1981.

Yanagisawa Minami (柳沢南), Miura Baien to Nihon Bunka Yanagisawa, Maebashi, 2012

== Illustrative quotations ==
1. From Reiji, “Remarks” 例旨(also translated as “Preface”, or “Exemplification”), Section 8:

“When I use the word “ki”, there are the kinds ki and object, ki and body, ki and shape, ki and matter, ki and image, heaven and ki, mind and ki, ki and colour, and so on. When I use “spirit” there are the kinds heaven and spirit, essence and spirit, spirit and object, spirit and soul, phantom and spirit, spirit and man, sagacity and spirit, and so on. When I use “heaven”, there are the kinds heaven and earth, heaven and spirit, heaven and object, heaven and man, heaven and destiny, and so on. Words are names, subjects are realities. Subjects are heaven, words are man.”

A jōri term changes its meaning precisely according to the term it is paired with. One key jōri term is ki ( 気), to which Baien assigns unique meanings. 2. From Honsō, “Core text”:

“As an illustration, take a piece of brocade. The raw side consists of warp threads and woof threads, scarlet threads and green threads, but on the finished side are flowers, grass, and fabulous birds. The spirit of these comes from the imagination of a clever woman. And so one piece of brocade has a nature that is endowed with two bodies, the raw side and the finished side, a clever seamstress brings spirit to it, objects are fixed to it by silk threads, and an incomprehensible human art attains the mystery of heaven's creation....”

In the first pages of Honsō the metaphor of the robe illustrates his view of the universe. Phoenixes and dragons may be mythical creatures but here they represent objects such as trees, stars and everyday things. It is as though one side of the universe consists of such things, and this is the real world. But there is another side of the universe that is quite different, for some it may consist of constantly moving atomic particles, for example, and this side too is the real world.

The fact that the two sides are quite different, but inseparable, provides a good example of his terminology. In the two jōri pairs “whole and side” and “whole and part”, “whole” changes meaning according to whether or not it is paired with “side” or with “part”. “Side” here corresponds to the right side or the wrong side of a fabric, two sides of a whole, one thing. “Part” is a piece of the whole, as the sleeve of a garment is. (The physicist Yukawa Hideki has commented on the applicability of Baien's jōri system to Böhr's theory of the complementarity of the wave and particle theories of light. [Yukawa Hideki: Baien kenkyū, 1, 1970]).

3. From Letter to Yunisaki Yoshitada: (Baien writes the characters for yin and yang without the left hand radical.)

“The items "yin" and "yang" are first seen in I Ching. However, their sense there was sometimes the Way, sometimes the Forms, and sometimes the Lines. Although I Ching is an account of divination, to look at heaven and earth through that text is like scratching an itching foot without taking off one's sandal. ”

Baien's dualism is his own: it is neither the Chinese yin and yang nor European dialectic. Although Baien was well versed in the corpus of Chinese and Japanese scholarship he breaks with tradition. He is not easily described as a member of any school of thought. His individuality makes heavy demands on readers of Gengo, Eastern and Western alike. It might be said that this individuality makes the thought of Miura Baien universally accessible. 4. From Letter to Asada Gōryū, 1763:

“At the beginning of this spring, I reread several of the passages you recommended. I spent several days unrolling volumes. At last I understood your meaning and became overjoyed. . . .

Hundreds of scholars have studied calendrical science, but none has reached your level. How fortunate I am to be living here at the same time, and to hear your words.

With an instrument you made yourself you discovered black spots moving on the surface of the sun. You discovered the intricate details of the jagged surface of the moon. You learned about the phases of Venus, the movements of the satellites of Saturn and Jupiter, and the orbits of the planets around the sun. You have observed lunar eclipses . . . . Although I cannot understand all your methods you have given me a great notebook for the study of jōri.”

Asada Gōryū was the son of Baien's teacher in the village of Kitsuki. Asada independently discovered Kepler's 3rd law of planetary motion when Japan was closed to the West apart from the Dutch visitors to Nagasaki. Asada studied at the Kaitokudō, a merchant academy in Osaka. [See Najita Tetsuo: Visions of Virtue in Tokugawa Japan.] Information about European texts and ideas was could be brought overland from Nagasaki to Kitsuki and by sea to the Kaitokudō, stimulating scientific study there. Baien himself strove to develop a philosophical unifying theory of everything in the universe rather than a specific science. 5. From Reiji 例旨, Section 3:

“Oh, I may draw a flower with consummate skill, but it will not bear seeds. I may carve a faithful copy of a bird, but it will never be as beautiful as the original. The craft of heaven borrows nothing from man, and the craft of man can never imitate heaven.”

Baien drew numerous diagrams illustrating parts of his theory but acknowledged that diagrams alone were inadequate to represent the vast and complex jōri system. 6. From Reiji 例旨, Section 2

“Thus, those who desire to read this book can read freely, upstream against the current, following the current downwards, taking something from the left, something from the right, pulling this from the centre, or that from the margin. It is just as one can turn a wheel from any point the hand touches it. ”

After the introductory "Remarks", Gengo is ordered by the two chapters of Honsō ("Core Text"), followed by three volumes, each of which is divided into two sections, the Volume of Heaven, the Volume of Earth, and the Volume of the Small. These texts elaborate and develop the themes of Honsō. 7. From “Reply to Taga Bokkei”

“Because I do not have an accurate grasp of heaven and earth, my habits of thought must have led me to numerous errors. Therefore in my three books with their many thousands of words, those words that agree with heaven and earth should be attributed to heaven and earth, and those that do not agree with heaven and earth should be imputed to me. One must not trust my words blindly, but verify them by heaven and earth, and accept only those things that heaven and earth show to be correct.”
