= Mount Ōmure =

Mountain in Ōita Prefecture, Japan

- 大村山
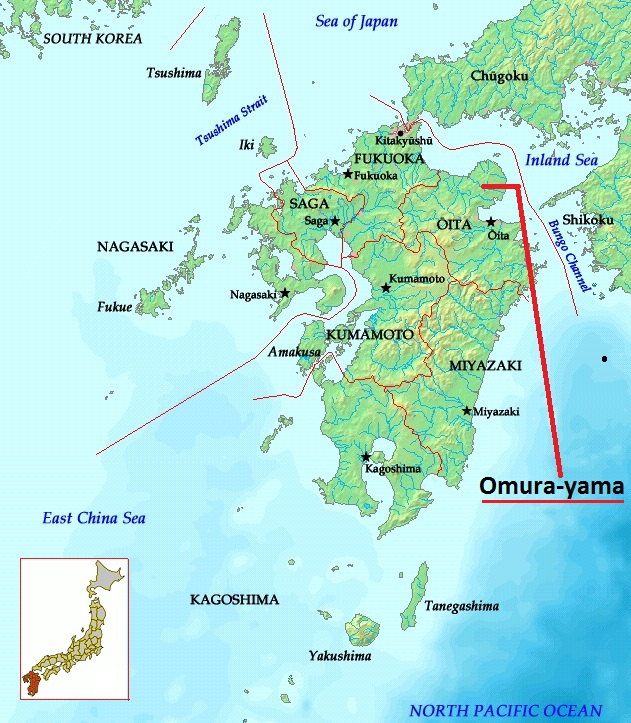
- Location in Kyūshū

Highest point
- Elevation: 1,373 m (4,505 ft)
- Coordinates: 33°27′1.79″N 131°28′8.99″E

Geography
- Location: Kyūshū, Japan

Mount Ōmure (大村山, Ōmure-san) is a mountain located on the Kunisaki Peninsula in Ōita Prefecture, Kyūshū, Japan.
