= Maki Ōdō =

Coordinates: 33.501122°N 131.517641°E

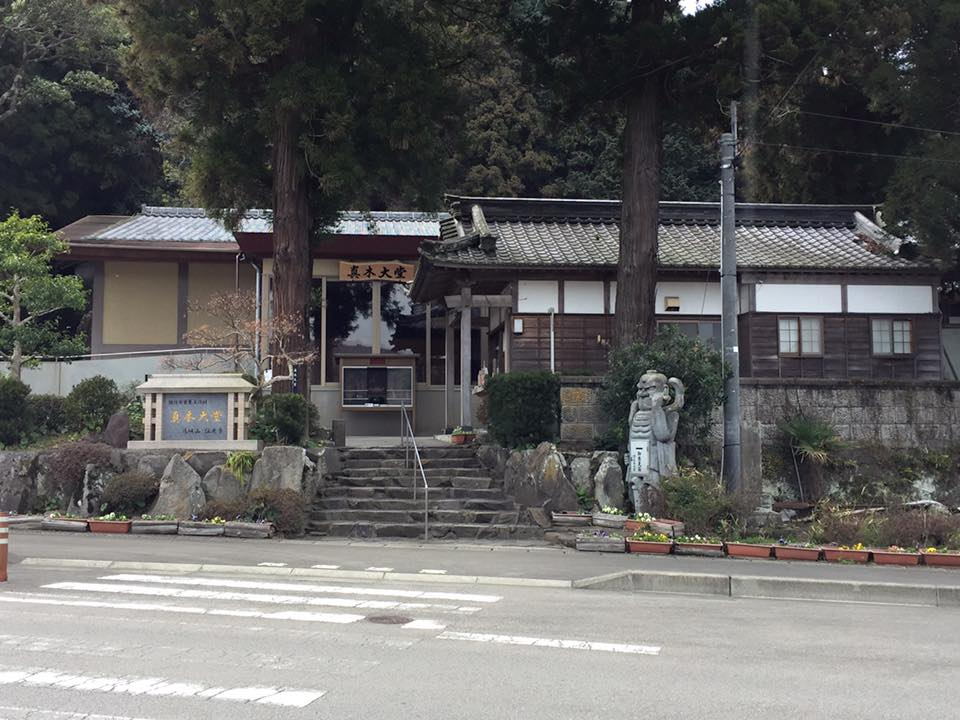
Maki Ōdō

Maki Ōdō (真木大堂) is an historic temple in Bungotakada, Ōita Prefecture, Japan. The current buildings are the Edo-period Hondō and an exhibition hall dating to 1955. Inside are nine Heian-period statues that have been designated Important Cultural Properties.

== Statues ==
- Seated wooden statue of Amida Nyorai (Gohonzon)
- Wooden statue of Daiitoku Myōō seated on a cow
- Triad of Fudō Myōō
- Four Guardian Kings

== See also ==
- Japanese sculpture
- Fuki-ji
- Kumano magaibutsu
- Ōita Prefectural Museum of History
