= Himeshima, Ōita =

Himeshima 姫島村
- Village
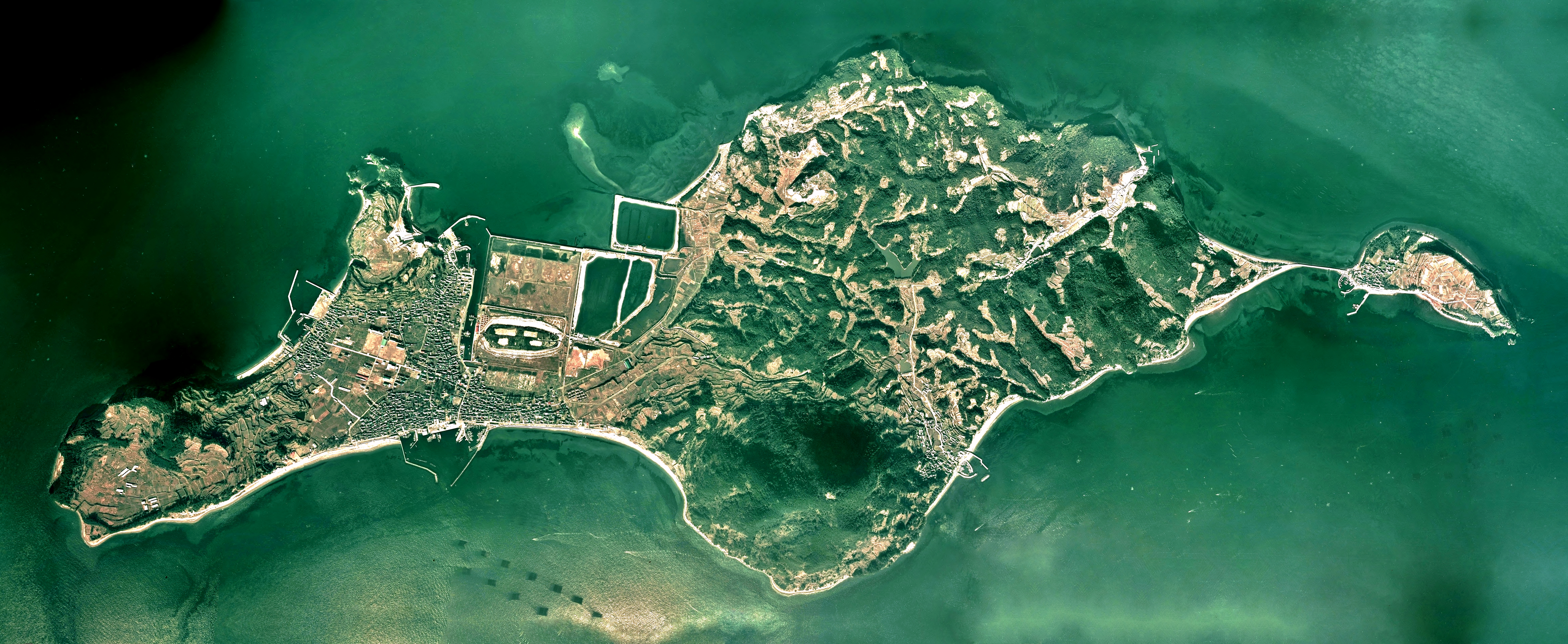
- Himeshima Island

- Flag Emblem

- Location of Himeshima in Ōita Prefecture

- Location in Japan
- Coordinates: 33°43′28″N 131°38′43″E
- Country: Japan
- Region: Kyushu
- Prefecture: Ōita Prefecture
- District: Higashikunisaki

Area
  - Total: 6.98 km^{2} (2.69 sq mi)

Population (March 1, 2017)
  - Total: 1,930
  - Density: 277/km^{2} (716/sq mi)
- Time zone: UTC+09:00 (JST)
- Website: www.himeshima.jp/index.html

Himeshima (姫島村, Himeshima-mura) is a village located in Higashikunisaki District, Ōita Prefecture, Japan. The name Himeshima literally means "Princess Island." It was the real life inspiration for Himegashima Island.

== Geography ==
The village is on a small island in the Seto Inland Sea and is sometimes referred to as Hime Island in English. The island of Himeshima is just off the Kunisaki Peninsula on the island of Kyūshū.

The island consists of four volcanically-formed islets which are now connected by sandbars to form Himeshima Island. Signs of the volcanic activity which formed the now-connected islets 300,000 years ago can be found throughout the island.

The tallest mountain on the island is Mount Yahazu (矢筈岳, Yahazu-dake). It is a volcano that was active 90,000 years ago. It is sometimes referred to as "Himeshima Fuji" due to its importance to the people of the island and its distinctive lava domes.

== Transportation ==
=== With the mainland ===
Himeshima is accessible by ferry from Imi Port (伊美港) in Kunisaki and has 12 regularly scheduled round-trip departures per day. It is about a 20 minute ride one way.

=== On the island ===
There is a village bus which travels around the island six times per day.

Bicycles and ultra-compact electric cars are available to rent on the island.

== Population ==
As of 2022, the village has an estimated population of 1,642. The total area is 6.98 km^{2}. There are 833 households and 98 businesses employing 389 people.

== Economy ==
The main occupations are fishing and shrimp farming. The kuruma prawn (車海老, kurumaebi) and hijiki are local specialities on the island.

Tourism is another major industry with nearly 40,000 people visiting the island every year.

Himeshima has launched a website to promote itself as "IT Island" in order to attract IT companies and personnel to the island.

== Festivals and events ==
Every summer around Obon, there is type of bon odori (盆踊り) called "fox dance" (キツネ踊り, kitsune odori) featuring dancers, particularly young children, dressed as foxes.

In October of every year, there is a "Kuruma Prawn Festival" (車えび祭) for visitors to enjoy the local specialty. Visitors can also enjoy the popular kitsune odori at this event as well.

Every year, chestnut tiger butterflies can be seen on the island from mid-May to mid-June as well as in mid-October as they stop in Himeshima during their long migrations. The butterflies, called Asagimadara (アサギマダラ) in Japanese, draw many visitors to the island.

== The "Seven Wonders of Himeshima" ==
On Himeshima, there are seven popular sightseeing locations, all with legends surrounding them, which are referred to as the "Seven Wonders of Himeshima" (姫島七不思議, himeshima nana fushigi). They are as follows:

- Amida Oysters: in a cave under the island's lighthouse, there are oysters which are said to never come into contact with seawater. It is believed that eating them will cause stomachaches.
- Hyoshimizu: iron rich and naturally carbonated onsen with water relatively cool in temperature. A local legend says that a princess who wanted to rinse her mouth after applying ohaguro caused the water to start flowing.
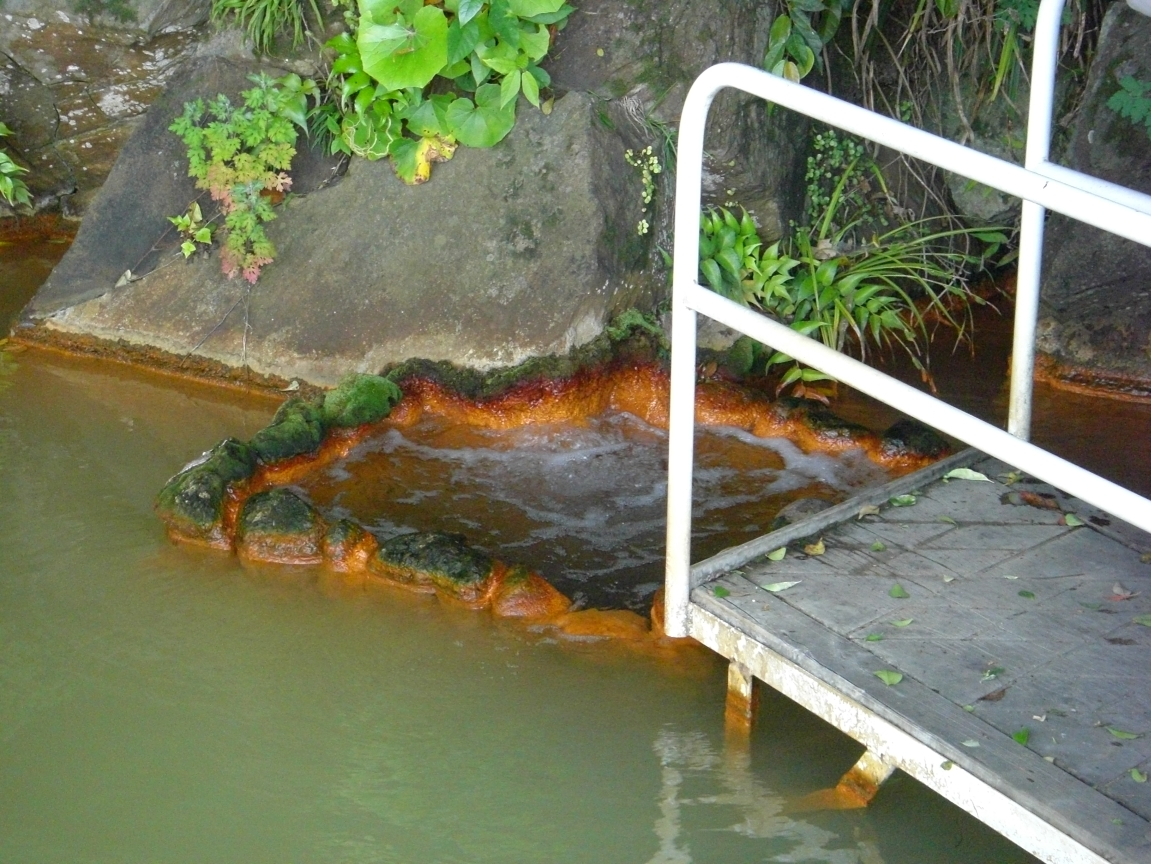
  Source of Hyoshimizu onsen
- The Inverted Willow: a willow tree that is believed to have sprouted after a princess placed her toothpick into the ground upside-down.
- The Ohaguro Stone: a stone which is believed to bear marks from when the princess applied her ohaguro.
- Sennin-do: a small Buddhist hall surrounded by an obsidian rock formation of volcanic origin. Local legends say that 1,000 people hid here on New Year's Eve to avoid paying taxes to a local lord (Sennin literally means "1,000 people").
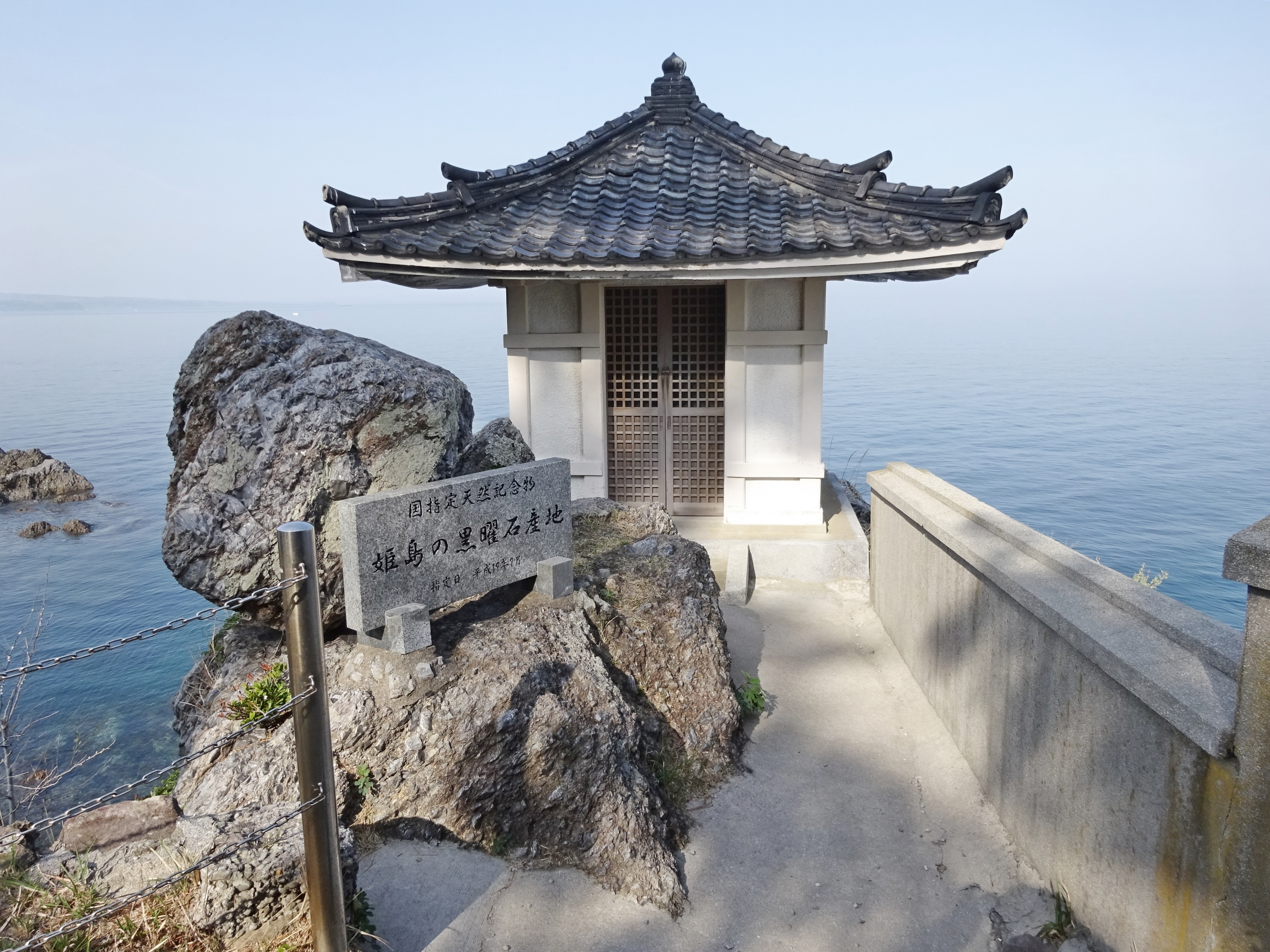
  Sennin-do
- Ukisu: a torii on a small piece of land in the ocean which is said to enshrine a kami of fishing. It is believed that the torii never becomes submerged by the sea.
- Ukita: a rice field in which a snake is said to have been buried. According to the legend, the rice fields began to shake due to the snake's anger.

== Education ==
There are currently two schools on the island, Himeshima Elementary School (姫島村立姫島小学校) and Himeshima Junior High School (姫島村立姫島中学校).

== Politics ==
In the 2017 Japanese general election, 77.51% of Himeshima's proportional ballots were cast for either one of the two parties in the conservative ruling coalition (the Liberal Democratic Party and Komeito) or one of the two minor LDP-allied conservative parties (Party for Japanese Kokoro and New Party Daichi), making it the most conservative municipality in the country in this election under that definition (excluding Kuroshima Island's 82.76% conservative voting result, as this island is technically a part of Matsuura, Nagasaki and not its own municipality).

In 2024, Akio Fujimoto (藤本昭夫), the head of Himeshima village, retired after serving for 40 years. He was replaced by Yasuharu Daikai (大海靖治) in an uncontested election.

== Famous people ==
- Eiichi Nishimura - Politician and minister
