= Kunisaki Peninsula =

Peninsula in Ōita Prefecture, Japan

Coordinates: 33°32′N 131°36′E

Location of Kunisaki Peninsula in Kyushu

The Kunisaki Peninsula (国東半島, Kunisaki Hantō) is a peninsula in northern Ōita Prefecture, Kyushu, Japan that juts out into the Seto Inland Sea. The peninsula is almost circular. There is Mount Futago (両子山, Futago-san) in the central part of the peninsula.

== Rokugō Manzan ==
On the Kunisaki Peninsula, there are several mountain valleys which radiate from the centrally located Mount Futago outwards toward the surrounding sea. Beginning 1,300 years ago, these areas were divided into six sections. Many temples were constructed in this area and the area developed a unique religious culture. The temples and the unique culture of these valleys is referred to as Rokugō Manzan (六郷満山). This culture is said to be the birthplace of Shinbutsu-shūgō (神仏習合), or the syncretism of Shinto and Buddhism.

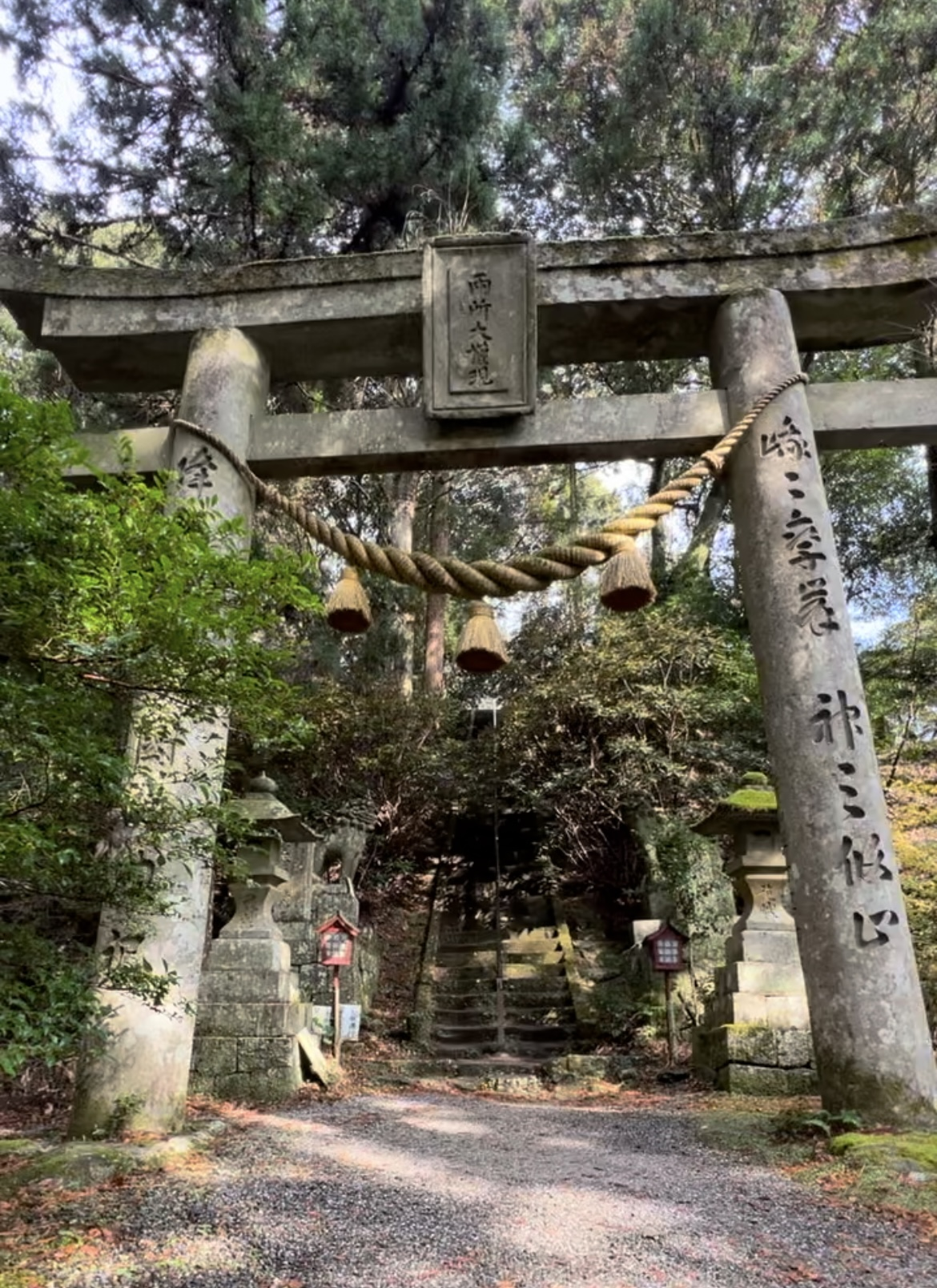
Torii, typically seen at Shinto shrines, at Futago-ji Temple. This is indicative of Rokugō Manzan's mix of Shinto and Buddhist elements.

Some of the influences of Shinbutsu-shūgō can be seen in the many Rokugō Manzan Tendai sect temples. The Rokugō Manzan temples' Shinto elements originated from the influences of nearby Usa Jingū, the head shrine of Hachiman shrines in Japan. Usa Jingū, which is located in Usa at the base of the Kunisaki Peninsula, was itself influenced by Buddhist elements. In fact, the former Usa Hachimangu-ji (宇佐八幡宮寺) which was at the site of the present-day Usa Jingū is said to be the earliest example of Jingū-ji, or "mixed shrine-temple complex."

The most central of the Rokugō Manzan temples is Futago-ji (両子寺）which is more than 1,300 years old and is located on Mount Futago. Other important Buddhist temples and sites in the area include:

- Fuki-ji（富貴寺) a temple which, dating back to the Heian period, is the oldest wooden building in Kyushu.
- Kumano Magaibutsu (熊野磨崖仏) statues which are the largest Buddhist stone carvings in Japan.
- Maki Ōdō (真木大堂) a temple which contains National Treasure statues of Amida Buddha.
- Monjusen-ji (文殊仙寺) which is the oldest temple in Kunisaki and is dedicated to Amitabha.
- Iwato-ji (岩戸寺) where Shujo Onie, a fire festival with oni is sometimes held.

== Hiking ==
The Kunisaki Peninsula is known for its mountain climbs and hiking trails. The Kunisaki Hantou Minemichi Long Trail (国東半島峯道ロングトレイル), or simply "The Kunisaki Long Trail," is a well-known 134 kilometer-long hiking route which is located on the peninsula. Hikers may choose to do the trail in its entirety or sections of it. The trail, which has been used by monks for hundreds of years, leads hikers to many of the peninsula's most notable landmarks (primarily its temples).

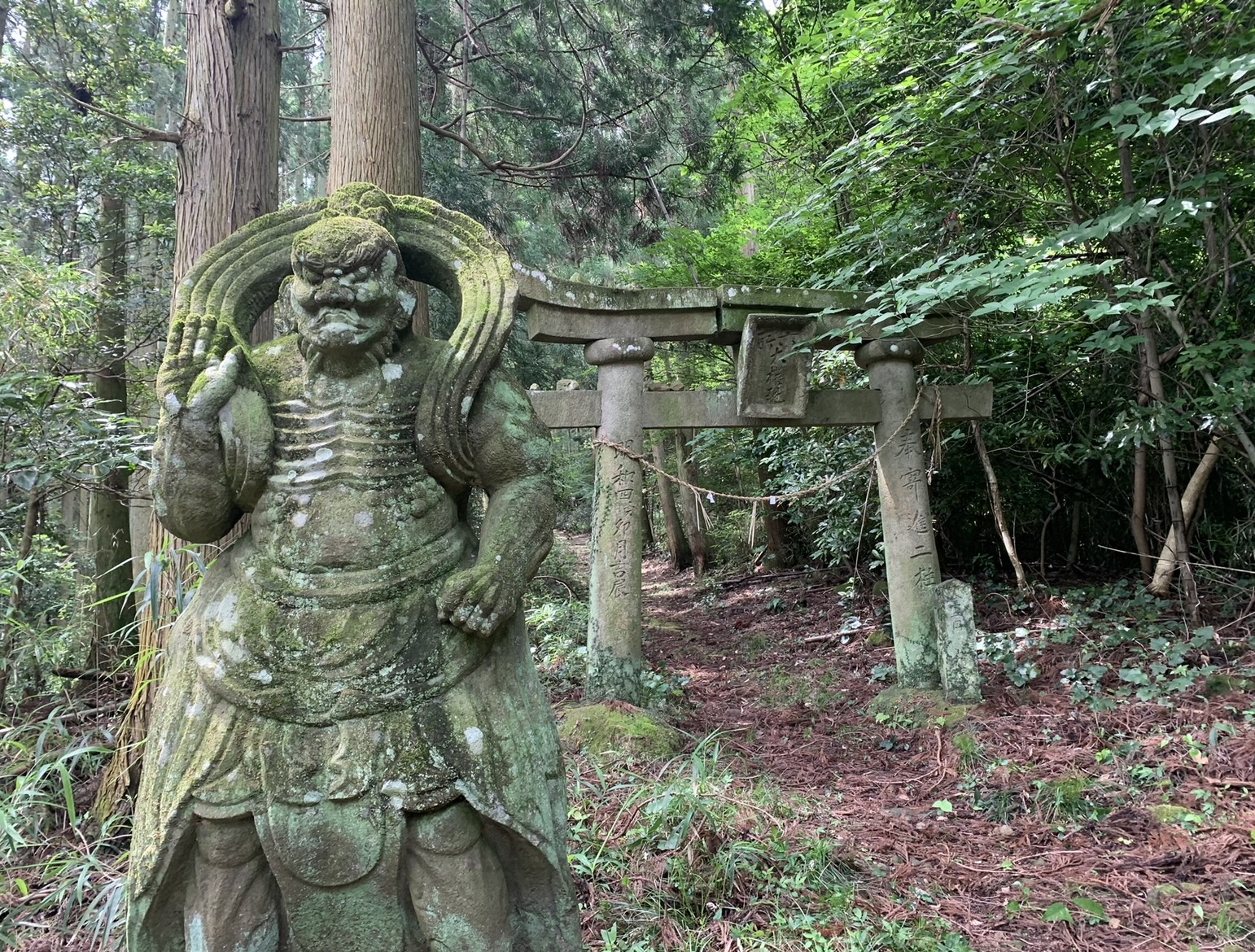
Stone Buddhist Nio guardian statue in front of a torii along the Kunisaki Long Trail. This too shows the peninsula's history of Shinbutsu-shūgō.

During the trek, many stone Buddhist statues can be seen. It is said that more than half of all stone statues in Japan are located on the Kunisaki Peninsula. The trail also includes a climb of the 721-meter-tall (2,365 ft) Mount Futago, the tallest mountain on the peninsula.

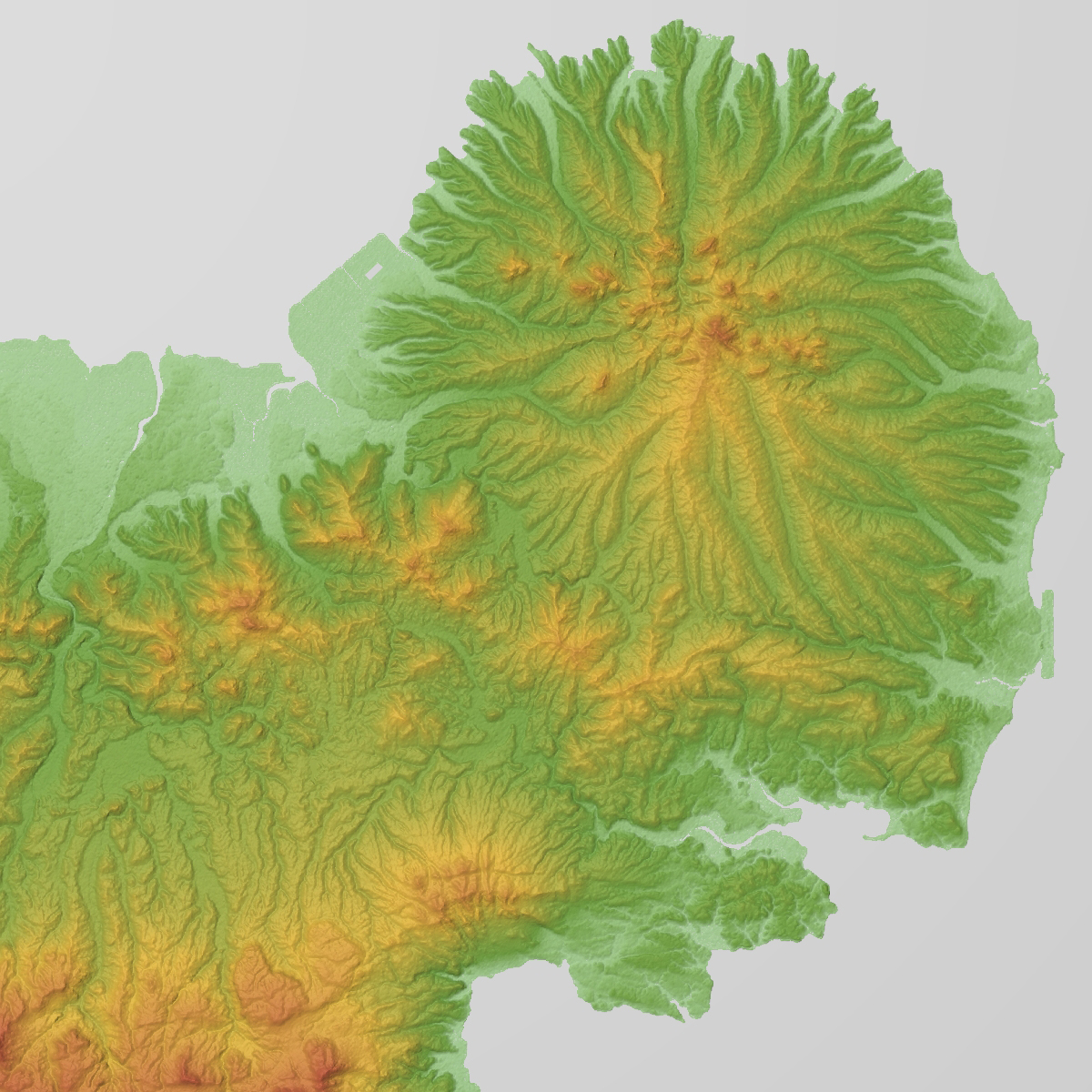
Relief map of Kunisaki Peninsula. The valleys which led to the creation of Rokugo Manzan are visible.

== Transportation ==
=== Airports ===
Oita Airport is located in the southeastern part of the peninsula on reclaimed land in Kunisaki.

=== Railways ===
The JR Kyushu Nippō Main Line is runs through the base of the peninsula.

=== Roads ===
Japan National Route 10 runs through the base of the peninsula. Japan National Route 213 runs along the coast of the peninsula.

=== Sea ===
The Suonada Ferry Company (スオーナダフェリー) runs a car ferry between Tokuyama, Yamaguchi Prefecture (located on Honshu) and Takedatsu on the Kunisaki Peninsula.

A hovercraft which connected Oita Airport on the peninsula to Ōita City until it was suspended in 2009 is planned to resume service in fall of 2024.

Regular ferries connect the island of Himeshima, which is located just off the coast of the peninsula, to a port in Imi on the Kunisaki Peninsula.

== Municipalities in the peninsula ==
- Bungotakada
- Kunisaki
- Kitsuki
- Hayami District
  - Hiji
