= Higashikunisaki District, Ōita =

District in Ōita prefecture, Japan

Higashikunisaki District 東国東郡
- District
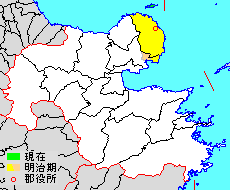
- Location of Higashikunisaki District (small green island at the top) in Ōita Prefecture (Kunisaki is yellow)
- Coordinates: 33°43′N 131°39′E
- Country: Japan
- Prefecture: Ōita
- Municipalities: 1 village: Himeshima

Area
  - Total: 6.99 km^{2} (2.70 sq mi)

Population (2020)
  - Total: 1,606
  - Density: 230/km^{2} (595/sq mi)
- Time zone: UTC+9 (JST)

Higashikunisaki (東国東郡, Higashikunisaki-gun) is a district located in Ōita Prefecture, Japan.

As of April 2025, the district has an estimated population of 1,695. The total area is now down to 6.99 km^{2}.

There is only one village left in the district.

- Himeshima

Until March 30, 2006, the district additionally had four towns.

- Aki
- Kunimi
- Kunisaki
- Musashi

== District timeline ==
- July 22, 1878 – Higashikunisaki District was founded after Kunisaki District was broken into Higashikunisaki and Nishikunisaki Districts.
- On March 31, 2006, the old town of Kunisaki absorbed the towns of Aki, Kunimi and Musashi to become the new city of Kunisaki.

== Sources ==
- Kadokawa Nihon Chimei Daijiten Hensan Iinkai, ed. (1980-11-01). Kadokawa Nihon Chimei Daijiten 角川日本地名大辞典 [Kadokawa Japanese Place Name Dictionary] (in Japanese). Vol. 44 (Ōita-ken). Kadokawa Shoten. ISBN 4-04-001440-5.
- "Kyūdaka Kyūryō Torishirabechō Database" 旧高旧領取調帳データベース [Database of Former Yields [tax values] and Former Domains] (in Japanese). National Museum of Japanese History.
