= Toyohiko Yoshida =

Japanese baseball player and manager (born 1966)

Kōchi Fighting Dogs – No. 84
- Pitcher / Manager / Coach
- Born: September 4, 1966; Kunisaki, Ōita, Japan
- Batted: Left Threw: Left

NPB debut
- April 10, 1988, for the Nankai Hawks

Last appearance
- October 4, 2007, for the Tohoku Rakuten Golden Eagles

NPB statistics (through 2007)
- Win–loss record: 81–102
- Earned run average: 4.38
- Strikeouts: 17
- Saves: 4

Teams
- As player: Nankai Hawks / Fukuoka Daiei Hawks (1988–1998); Hanshin Tigers (1998–2001); Osaka Kintetsu Buffaloes (2002–2004); Tohoku Rakuten Golden Eagles (2005–2007); As manager: Kōchi Fighting Dogs (2020–present); As coach: Tohoku Rakuten Golden Eagles (2008–2011); Kōchi Fighting Dogs (2012–2019)

Career highlights and awards
- 3× NPB All-Star (1992, 1994, 2003)
- Last updated on: 5 May 2020

Toyohiko Yoshida (吉田 豊彦, Yoshida Toyohiko; born September 4, 1966 in Kunisaki, Ōita, Japan) is a Japanese former Nippon Professional Baseball pitcher.
