= Kunisaki, Ōita (town) =

Dissolved municipality in Ōita prefecture, Japan

Kunisaki (国東町, Kunisaki-machi) was a town located in Higashikunisaki District, Ōita Prefecture, Japan.

As of October 1, 2004, the town had an estimated population of 13,106 and the density of 116.73 persons per km^{2}. The total area was 112.28 km^{2}.

On March 31, 2006, Kunisaki absorbed the towns of Aki, Kunimi and Musashi (all from Higashikunisaki District) to create the city of Kunisaki.
