= Kunimi, Ōita =

Dissolved municipality in Ōita prefecture, Japan

Kunimi (国見町, Kunimi-chō) was a town located in Higashikunisaki District, Ōita Prefecture, Japan.

As of 2003, the town had an estimated population of 5,457 and the density of 74.84 persons per km^{2}. The total area was 72.92 km^{2}.

On March 31, 2006, Kunimi, along with the towns of Kunisaki (former), Aki and Musashi (all from Higashikunisaki District), was merged to create the city of Kunisaki.
