= Musashi, Ōita =

Dissolved municipality in Ōita prefecture, Japan

Musashi (武蔵町, Musashi-machi) was a town located in Higashikunisaki District, Ōita Prefecture, Japan. As of 2003, the town had an estimated population of 5,958 and the density of 142.40 persons per km^{2}. The total area was 41.84 km^{2}. On March 31, 2006, Musashi, along with the towns of Kunisaki (former), Aki and Kunimi (all from Higashikunisaki District), was merged to create the city of Kunisaki.
