= Usa Jingū =

Shinto shrine in Usa, Ōita, Japan

Usa Jingū 宇佐神宮
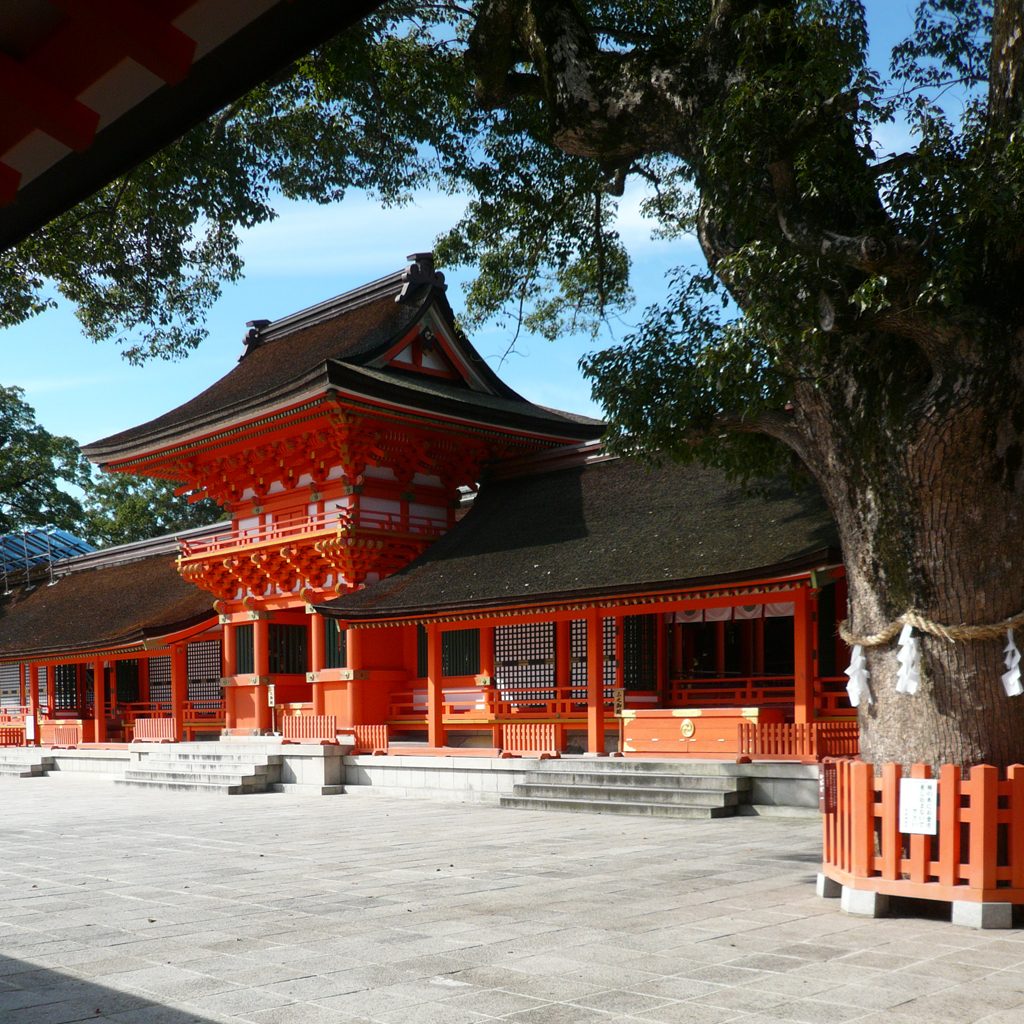
- The southern rōmon of Usa Jingū

- Location within Japan

Religion
- Affiliation: Shinto
- Deity: Hachiman
- Type: Hachiman shrine Chokusaisha

Location
- Location: 2859, Ōaza Minamiusa, Usa-shi, Ōita-ken
- Interactive map of Usa Jingū 宇佐神宮
- Coordinates: 33°31′34″N 131°22′29″E

Architecture
- Established: 8th century

Website
- www.usajinguu.com

Usa-jingū (宇佐神宮), also known as Usa Hachimangū (宇佐八幡宮), is a Shinto shrine in the city of Usa, Ōita in Japan. Emperor Ōjin, who was deified as Hachiman, the tutelary god of warriors, is said to be enshrined in all the sites dedicated to him. The first Hachiman shrine was at Usa, and was built in the early 8th century.

Usa-jingū has long been the recipient of Imperial patronage; and its prestige is considered second only to that of Ise Shrine.

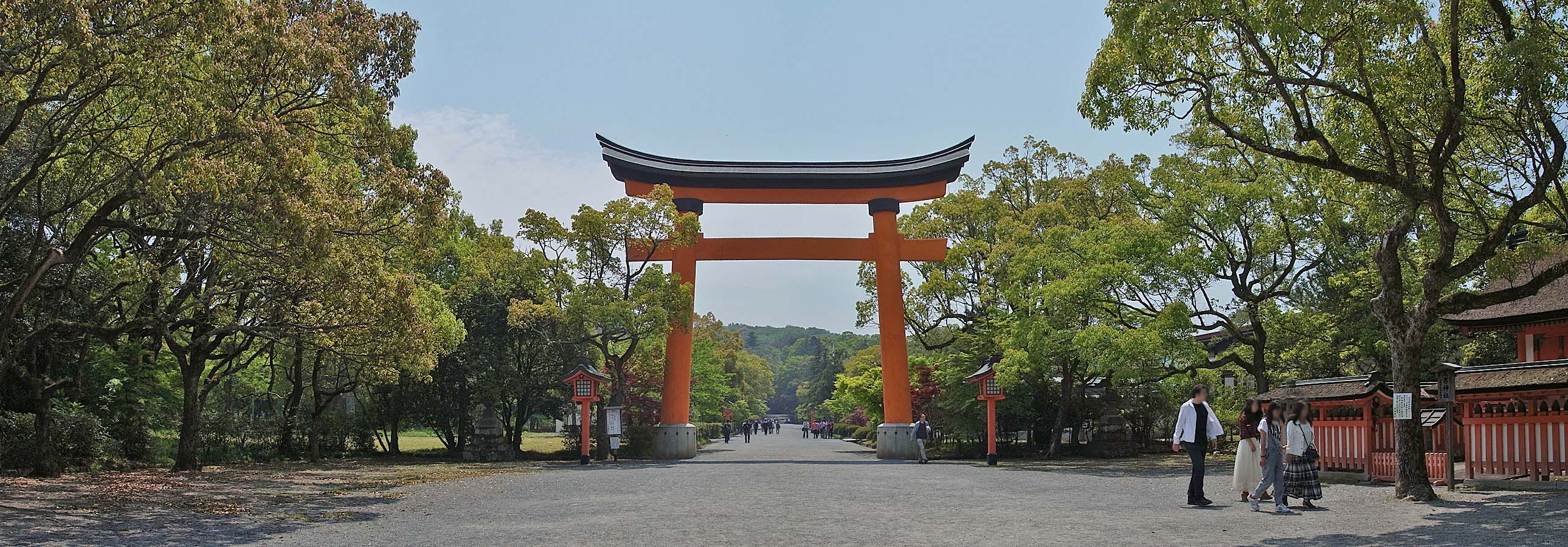
Torii and omote-sandō at Usa Jingū

== History ==
The shrine was founded in Kyushu during the Nara period. Ancient records place the foundation of Usa Jingū in the Wadō era (708–714). A temple called Miroku-ji (弥勒寺) was built next to it in 779, making it what is believed to be the first shrine-temple (jingū-ji) ever. The resulting mixed complex, called Usa Hachimangu-ji (宇佐八幡宮寺, Usa Hachiman Shrine Temple), lasted over a millennium until 1868, when the Buddhist part was removed to comply with the Kami and Buddhas Separation Act. Part of the remains of Miroku-ji can still be found within the grounds of Usa Jingū.

In connection with Miroku-ji, many Tendai temples were established across the Kunisaki Peninsula, forming the Rokugō Manzan (六郷満山). The resulting culture is said to be the first to have practiced shinbutsu-shūgō (神仏習合), the syncretism of Buddhism and kami. For this reason, Usa Jingū and the Rokugō Manzan temples are considered to be the birthplace of shinbutsu-shūgō.

Usa Jingū is today the center from which over 40,000 branch Hachiman shrines have grown. Usa's Hachiman shrine first appears in the chronicles of Imperial history during the reign of Empress Shōtoku. The empress allegedly had an affair with a Buddhist monk named Dōkyō. An oracle was said to have proclaimed that the monk should be made emperor, and the kami Hachiman at Usa was consulted for verification. The empress died before anything further could develop. In the 16th century, the temple was razed to the ground and repeatedly attacked by the Christian-sympathizing lord of Funai Domain, Ōtomo Yoshishige. The wife of Yoshishige, Lady Nata, was the High Priestess and, alongside the Nara Clan, resisted her former husband's attacks.

Usa Jingū was designated as the ichinomiya (first shrine) for the former Buzen Province.

From 1871 through 1946, Usa was officially designated one of the 1st rank Imperial Shrines, meaning that it stood in the first rank of government-supported shrines. Other similarly-honored Hachiman shrines were Iwashimizu Hachimangū of Yawata, Kyoto and Hakozaki-gū in Fukuoka, Fukuoka.

=== Mikoshi ===
Usa Jingū is considered to be the birthplace of mikoshi. The earliest recorded use of a mikoshi was in the 8th century during the Nara period. In 749, the shrine's mikoshi was used to carry the spirit of Hachiman from Kyushu to Nara, where the deity was to guard construction of the great Daibutsu at Tōdai-ji. By the 10th century, carrying mikoshi into the community during shrine festivals had become a conventional practice.

=== Branch shrines ===
Over the course of centuries, a vast number of Hachiman shrines have extended the reach of the kami at Usa:

In 859, a branch offshoot was established to spread Hachiman's protective influence over Kyoto; and this Iwashimizu Hachimangū still draws worshipers and tourists today.

In 923, Hakozaki-gū was established at Fukuoka as a branch of Usa.

In 1063, Tsurugaoka Hachimangū was established by Minamoto no Yoriyoshi to extend Hachiman's protective influence over Kamakura, Kanagawa; and today this branch shrine attracts more visitors than any other shrine in Japan.

== Festivals and events ==
=== Hōjō-e festival ===
Because of its mixed religious ancestry, one of the important festivals at the shrine is the hōjō-e (放生会), the life release ceremony of Buddhism, in which captive birds and fish were released. The ceremony, held every autumn, is accompanied by kagura, ritual dances meant to commemorate the souls of fish killed by fishermen during the previous year. Hōjō-e, which contains both elements of Buddhism and Shinto and is now performed in many shrines throughout the country, first took place at Usa Jingū.

The event begins with the eight-kilometre carrying of a mikoshi from Usa to the banks of the Yorimo River (寄藻川). Upon arrival, the mikoshi is greeted by Buddhist monks from the Rokugō Manzan temples, who chant sutras to "welcome the deity." This is a clear display of Usa-jingū's historical connection to shinbutsu-shūgō. The following day, mollusks are released into the river.

=== Hatsumōde ===
The shrine attracts hundreds of thousands of visitors on and surrounding New Year's Day for Hatsumōde (初詣), or the first shrine visit of the new year. Many events including kagura performances are held on these days.

=== Goshinkosai ===
Goshinkosai (御神幸祭), or "Great Summer Festival", is a festival at Usa Jingū which includes a yabusame (流鏑馬) ritual, which involves mounted archery, a fireworks display, and the carrying of three kami (Hachiman-no-Okami, Hime-no-Okami, and Empress Jingū) in their respective mikoshi.

== Architecture ==
The main hall and the Kujaku Monkei are designated amongst Japan's National Treasures.

The structures which comprise the current shrine complex were built in the middle of the 19th century. Their characteristic configuration, called Hachiman-zukuri, consists of two parallel structures with gabled roofs interconnected on the non-gabled side to form what internally is a single building. Seen from the outside, however, the complex still gives the impression of being two separate buildings. The structure in front is called the ge-in, which is where the deity is said to reside during the daytime. The structure in the rear is called the nai-in, which serves as the deity's sleeping chamber during the night.

The vermillion-painted Kurehashi Bridge (呉橋) at the shrine's west approach is designated as an Important Tangible Cultural Property by Ōita Prefecture. When the original bridge was built is not known, but it already existed in the Kamakura period. The current bridge was built in 1622 by Hosokawa Tadatoshi, then the lord of the Kokura Domain.

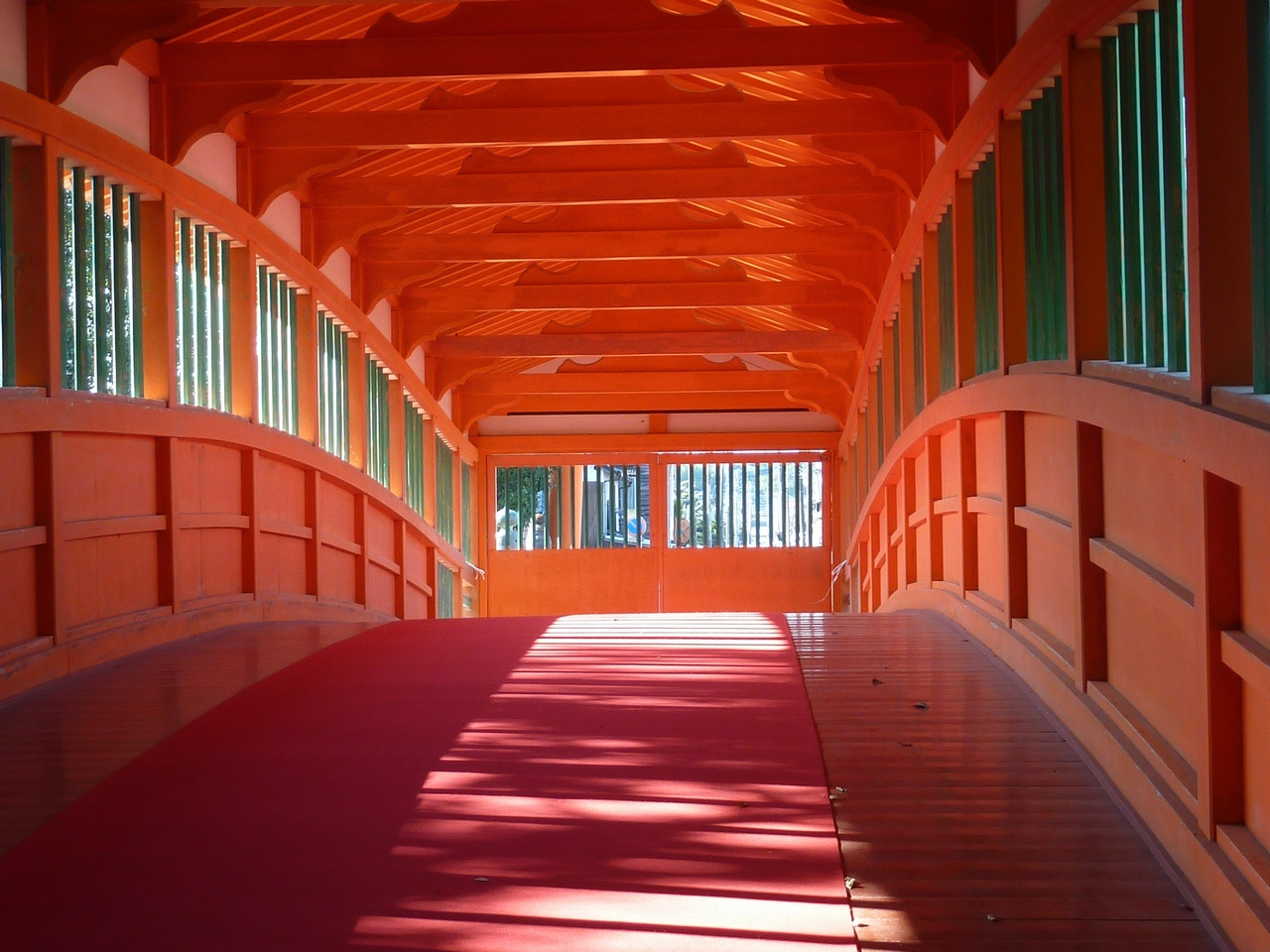
Interior of the Kurehashi Bridge (closed to the public)

== Worship style ==
The worship style at Usa Jingū differs from that of other shrines. After putting a coin in the saisen box (賽銭箱, saisen-bako), it is correct etiquette to bow twice, clap four times (rather than the usual two claps), then bow once.

== Access ==
The Daiko Hokubu Bus (大交北部バス) from Usa Station (JR Kyushu Nippō Main Line) bound for Yokkaichi or Nakatsu stops at Usa Hachiman bus stop in front of Usa Jingū.

There are four round-trip buses per day from Oita Airport to Usa Jingū.

In 2013, a slope car was installed to assist elderly and wheelchair-using visitors in reaching the Upper Shrine.

The former Usa Sangū Line (大分交通宇佐参宮線) once connected Bungotakada to the former Usa Hachiman Railway Station (宇佐八幡駅) at Usa Jingū. This train line was closed in 1965 at which point the station at Usa Jingū was demolished and turned into a parking lot. The Steam Locomotive Krauss No. 26, which once ran on the Usa Sangū Line, has been preserved and can be seen near the parking lot and main approach of Usa Jingū.

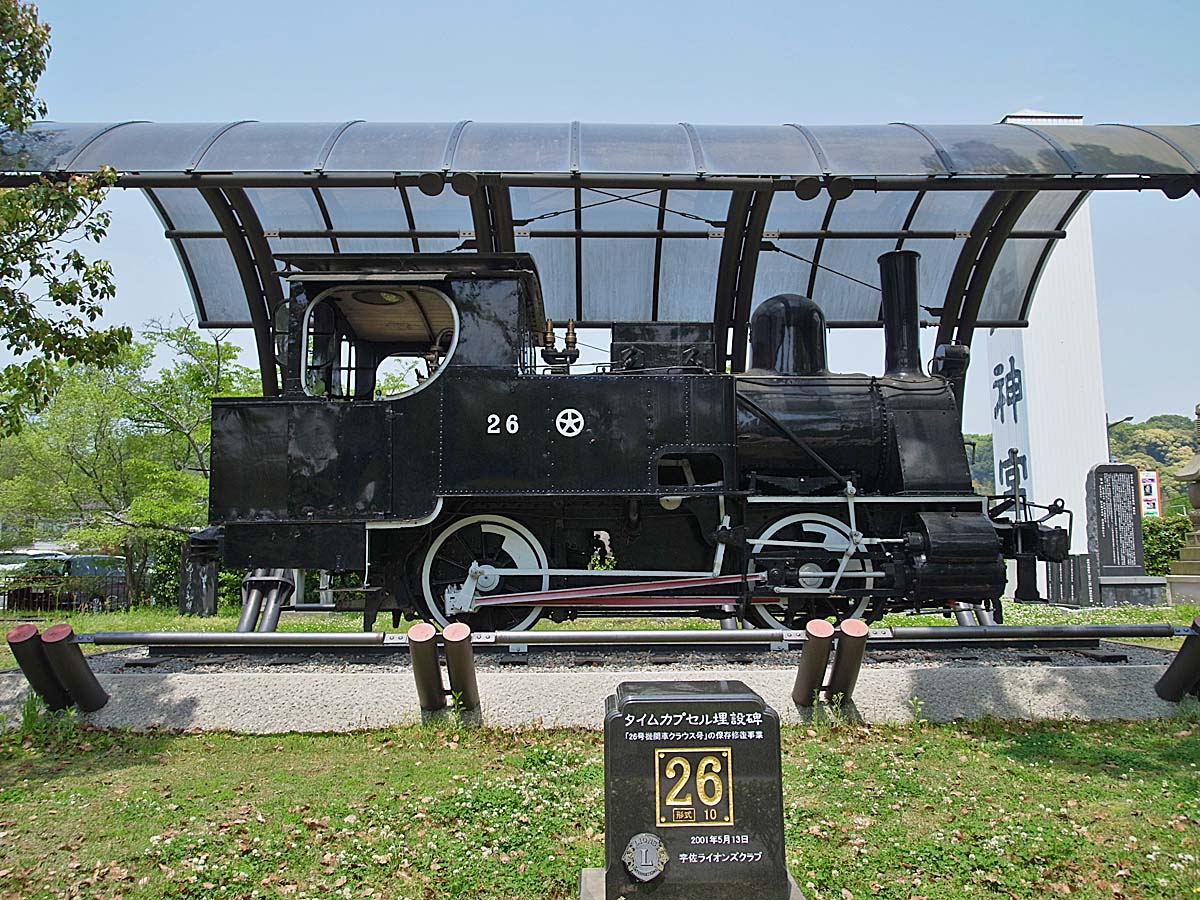
Steam Locomotive Krauss No. 26 preserved at Usa Jingū

== See also ==
- List of Jingū
- List of National Treasures of Japan (crafts-others)
- List of National Treasures of Japan (shrines)
- Ōita Prefectural Museum of History
