= Kunisaki =

Kunisaki 国東市
- City
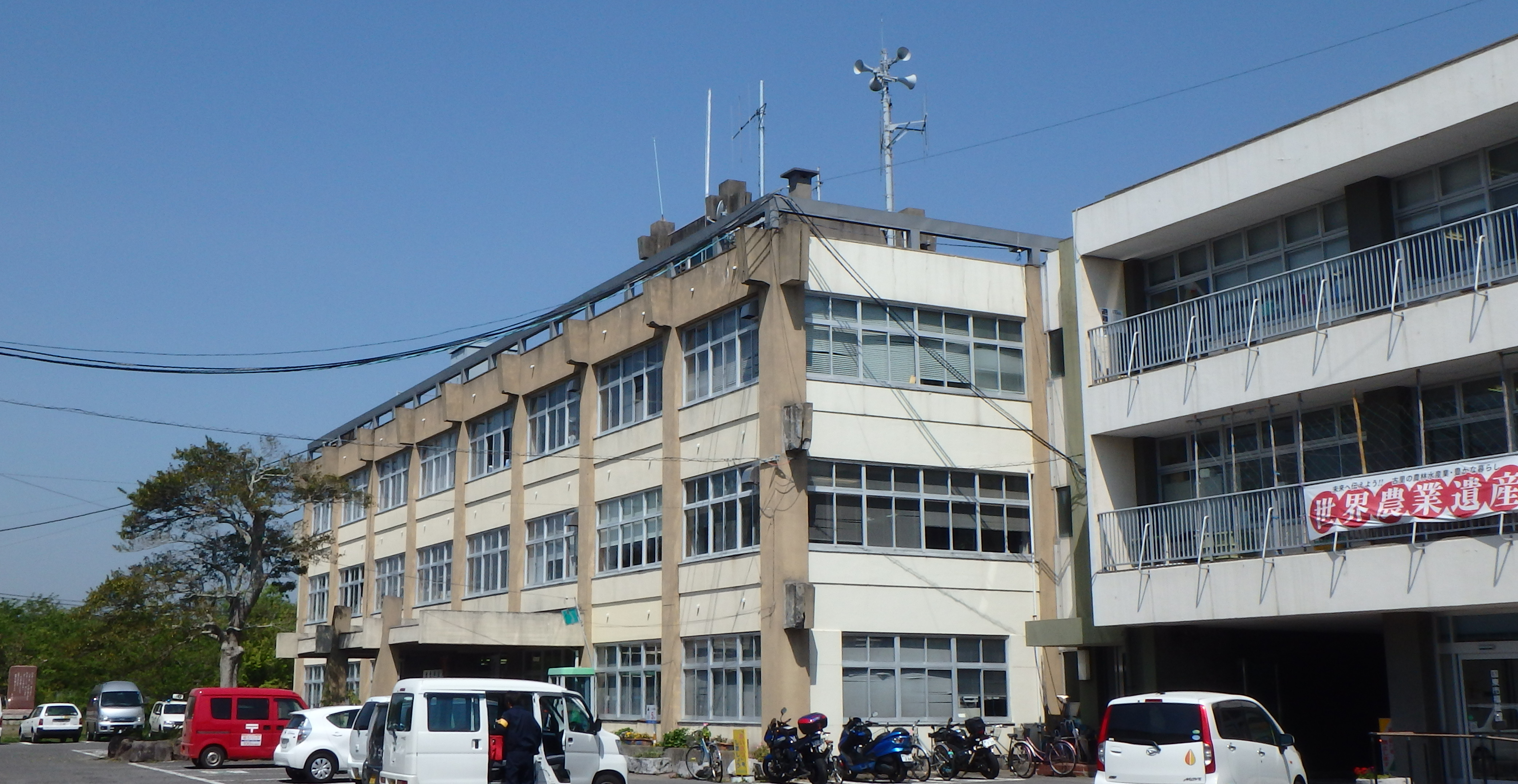
- Kunisaki city hall

- Flag Emblem
- Interactive map of Kunisaki
- Location in Japan
- Coordinates: 33°33′48″N 131°43′56″E
- Country: Japan
- Region: Kyushu
- Prefecture: Ōita

Government
  - Mayor: Tokuji Matsui (since 2023)

Area
  - Total: 318.10 km^{2} (122.82 sq mi)

Population (November 30, 2023)
  - Total: 25,721
  - Density: 80.858/km^{2} (209.42/sq mi)
- Time zone: UTC+09:00 (JST)
- City hall address: 49 Tsurukawa, Kunisaki-cho, Kunisaki-shi, Oita-ken 873-0501
- Climate: Cfa
- Website: Official website
- Symbols
- Bird: Green pheasant
- Flower: Tenderstem broccoli
- Tree: Cinnamomum camphora

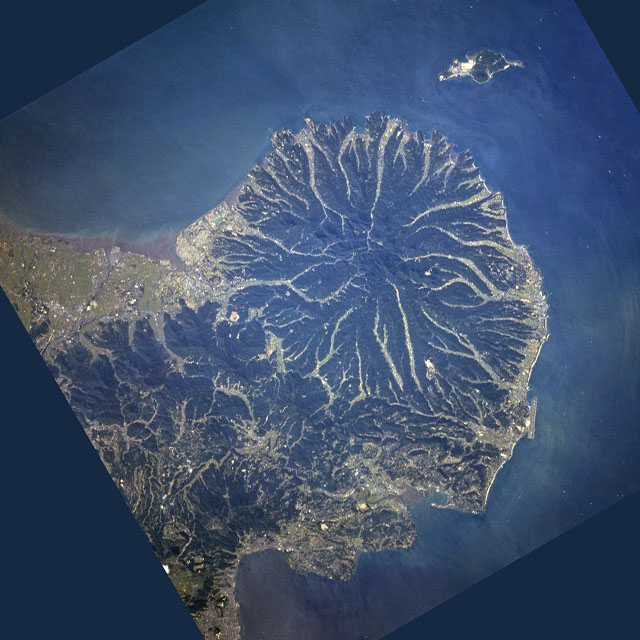
Colour Satellite view of Kunisaki Peninsula (ja:ファイル:Kunisaki Peninsula STS068-253-7.jpg)

Kunisaki (国東市, Kunisaki-shi) is a small coastal city located in Ōita Prefecture, Kyushu, Japan. As of 30 November 2023, the city had an estimated population of 25,721 in 13082 households, and a population density of 81 persons per km^{2}. The total area of the city is 318.10 km^{2} (122.82 sq mi).

== Geography ==
Kunisaki covers the northeastern part of Ōita Prefecture and almost the eastern half of the Kunisaki Peninsula (excluding the southeastern part), and faces the Gulf of Iyo on the Seto Inland Sea to the north and east. Settlements are scattered in areas near the sea, and the city center is located near the sea in the central eastern part of the city. The western part of the city is located in the central part of the Kunisaki Peninsula and is mountainous. The city center is located approximately 60 km by road (approximately 40 km in a straight line) from Ōita City, the prefectural capital.

=== Neighboring municipalities ===
Ōita Prefecture

- Bungo-Takada
- Kitsuki

=== Mountains ===
- Mount Fudo (or Hudo)
- Mount Futago (Futago-san) at 720m and the tallest
- Mount Monju (Monju-san)
- Mount Odomure
- Mount Otake
- Mount Takeshi Washinosu

=== Climate ===
Kunisaki has a humid subtropical climate (Köppen climate classification Cfa) with hot summers and cool winters. Precipitation is significant throughout the year, but is somewhat lower in winter. The average annual temperature in Kunisaki is 16.2 °C (61.2 °F). The average annual rainfall is 1,641.6 mm (64.63 in) with June as the wettest month. The temperatures are highest on average in August, at around 27.3 °C (81.1 °F), and lowest in January, at around 6.1 °C (43.0 °F). The highest temperature ever recorded in Kunisaki was 37.3 °C (99.1 °F) on 10 August 2013; the coldest temperature ever recorded was −7.9 °C (17.8 °F) on 8 January 2021.

Climate data for Kunimi, Kunisaki (1991−2020 normals, extremes 1977−present)
Month	Jan	Feb	Mar	Apr	May	Jun	Jul	Aug	Sep	Oct	Nov	Dec	Year
Record high °C (°F)	20.1 (68.2)	24.1 (75.4)	27.2 (81.0)	29.9 (85.8)	31.5 (88.7)	34.0 (93.2)	36.8 (98.2)	37.3 (99.1)	35.5 (95.9)	31.6 (88.9)	27.4 (81.3)	27.0 (80.6)	37.3 (99.1)
Mean daily maximum °C (°F)	9.9 (49.8)	10.7 (51.3)	14.1 (57.4)	19.3 (66.7)	23.9 (75.0)	26.6 (79.9)	30.7 (87.3)	32.0 (89.6)	28.3 (82.9)	23.3 (73.9)	17.8 (64.0)	12.3 (54.1)	20.7 (69.3)
Daily mean °C (°F)	6.1 (43.0)	6.6 (43.9)	9.4 (48.9)	14.1 (57.4)	18.6 (65.5)	22.2 (72.0)	26.3 (79.3)	27.3 (81.1)	23.8 (74.8)	18.7 (65.7)	13.5 (56.3)	8.4 (47.1)	16.3 (61.3)
Mean daily minimum °C (°F)	2.4 (36.3)	2.4 (36.3)	4.8 (40.6)	9.0 (48.2)	13.8 (56.8)	18.6 (65.5)	22.9 (73.2)	23.8 (74.8)	20.2 (68.4)	14.6 (58.3)	9.4 (48.9)	4.6 (40.3)	12.2 (54.0)
Record low °C (°F)	−4.4 (24.1)	−6.0 (21.2)	−4.2 (24.4)	0.4 (32.7)	5.3 (41.5)	9.7 (49.5)	15.6 (60.1)	16.4 (61.5)	9.3 (48.7)	4.6 (40.3)	1.4 (34.5)	−3.0 (26.6)	−6.0 (21.2)
Average precipitation mm (inches)	60.7 (2.39)	70.2 (2.76)	106.5 (4.19)	123.2 (4.85)	134.3 (5.29)	274.6 (10.81)	271.7 (10.70)	154.1 (6.07)	197.4 (7.77)	113.5 (4.47)	71.9 (2.83)	63.5 (2.50)	1,641.6 (64.63)
Average precipitation days (≥ 1.0 mm)	8.3	8.7	10.1	9.5	9.1	13.0	11.0	8.7	9.9	6.7	7.6	8.7	111.3
Mean monthly sunshine hours	132.7	150.3	186.8	201.5	210.8	155.0	195.9	230.0	175.1	181.2	147.4	129.6	2,096.3
Source: Japan Meteorological Agency

Climate data for Musashi, Kunisaki (2003−2020 normals, extremes 2003−present)
Month	Jan	Feb	Mar	Apr	May	Jun	Jul	Aug	Sep	Oct	Nov	Dec	Year
Record high °C (°F)	18.4 (65.1)	23.7 (74.7)	27.9 (82.2)	27.0 (80.6)	29.9 (85.8)	34.2 (93.6)	36.3 (97.3)	36.3 (97.3)	33.2 (91.8)	32.2 (90.0)	26.3 (79.3)	24.2 (75.6)	36.3 (97.3)
Mean daily maximum °C (°F)	9.9 (49.8)	10.9 (51.6)	13.6 (56.5)	18.0 (64.4)	21.8 (71.2)	24.2 (75.6)	28.0 (82.4)	29.6 (85.3)	27.1 (80.8)	23.0 (73.4)	17.9 (64.2)	12.3 (54.1)	19.7 (67.4)
Daily mean °C (°F)	6.1 (43.0)	7.0 (44.6)	9.5 (49.1)	13.8 (56.8)	18.1 (64.6)	21.4 (70.5)	25.1 (77.2)	26.7 (80.1)	24.2 (75.6)	19.5 (67.1)	14.2 (57.6)	8.5 (47.3)	16.2 (61.1)
Mean daily minimum °C (°F)	1.9 (35.4)	2.6 (36.7)	5.0 (41.0)	9.3 (48.7)	14.2 (57.6)	18.8 (65.8)	22.8 (73.0)	24.2 (75.6)	21.3 (70.3)	15.8 (60.4)	10.1 (50.2)	4.3 (39.7)	12.5 (54.5)
Record low °C (°F)	−7.9 (17.8)	−5.6 (21.9)	−2.2 (28.0)	0.5 (32.9)	5.5 (41.9)	11.8 (53.2)	17.4 (63.3)	18.0 (64.4)	13.6 (56.5)	8.0 (46.4)	1.1 (34.0)	−4.0 (24.8)	−7.9 (17.8)
Average precipitation mm (inches)	41.8 (1.65)	65.8 (2.59)	87.9 (3.46)	122.8 (4.83)	133.3 (5.25)	269.2 (10.60)	246.5 (9.70)	130.0 (5.12)	193.7 (7.63)	123.3 (4.85)	63.5 (2.50)	57.9 (2.28)	1,535.7 (60.46)
Average precipitation days (≥ 1.0 mm)	5.9	7.9	8.5	9.0	8.2	12.4	10.5	7.6	9.3	6.3	6.4	7.0	99
Source: Japan Meteorological Agency

== Demographics ==
Per Japanese census data, the population of Kunisaki in 2020 is 26,232 people. Kunisaki has been conducting censuses since 1920.

Historical population
Year	Pop.	±%
1950	65,370	—
1955	63,287	−3.2%
1960	58,786	−7.1%
1965	52,016	−11.5%
1970	46,521	−10.6%
1975	42,579	−8.5%
1980	40,504	−4.9%
1985	39,784	−1.8%
1990	37,771	−5.1%
1995	36,253	−4.0%
2000	35,425	−2.3%
2005	34,206	−3.4%
2010	32,007	−6.4%
2015	28,647	−10.5%
2020	26,232	−8.4%
Kunisaki population statistics

== History ==
The area of Kunisaki was part of ancient Bungo Province. During the Edo period it was mostly under control of Kitsuki Domain and was ruled by a cadet branch of the Matsudaira clan, with smaller areas administered as tenryō territory under the direct control of the Tokugawa shogunate. After the Meiji restoration, the village of Kunisaki within Higashikunisaki District, Ōita was established on May 1, 1889 with the creation of the modern municipalities system. It was raised to town status on November 8, 1894. The city of Kunisaki was founded on March 31, 2006, from the merger of the former town of Kunisaki, absorbing the towns of Aki, Kunimi and Musashi (all from Higashikunisaki District).

On June 25, 2008, the City of Kunisaki declared itself a 'Nuclear-free Peace City" in wishing the abolition of nuclear weapons and world permanent peace.

== Government ==
Kunisaki has a mayor-council form of government with a directly elected mayor and a unicameral city council of 18 members. Kunisaki, together with the village of Himeshima, Ōita contributes one member to the Ōita Prefectural Assembly. In terms of national politics, the city is part of the Ōita 3rd district of the lower house of the Diet of Japan.

== Economy ==
The main industry is agriculture, including fruit and vegetable cultivation and commercial fishing. Industries include factories operated by Oita Canon and Sony Semiconductor Manufacturing Co., Ltd.

== Education ==
Kunisaki has seven public elementary schools and three public junior high schools and one public high school operated by the city government and one public high school operated by the Ōita Prefectural Board of Education.

== Transportation ==
=== Airports ===
- Oita Airport is located in Kunisaki.

=== Railways ===
Kunisaki has no passenger railway service. The nearest railway stations are Kitsuki Station, Ōgami Station, or Usa Station on the JR Kyushu Nippō Main Line, each of which has a bus service to the city.

=== Highways ===
- Ōita Airport Road
- National Route 213

== Local attractions ==
- Ankokuji Site, National Historic Site
- Futago-ji
- Gyonyu Dam and Lake Taro
- Onizuka Kofun, National Historic Site

== Notable people from Kunisaki ==
- Miura Baien, Edo period scholar
- Tatsumi Fujinami, Japanese professional wrestler
- Motoda Hajime, politician
- Sunao Tawara, pathologist
- Toyohiko Yoshida, former Japanese baseball pitcher (Nippon Professional Baseball)
