= Fuki-ji =

Buddhist temple in Bungotakada, Ōita, Japan

- 富貴寺
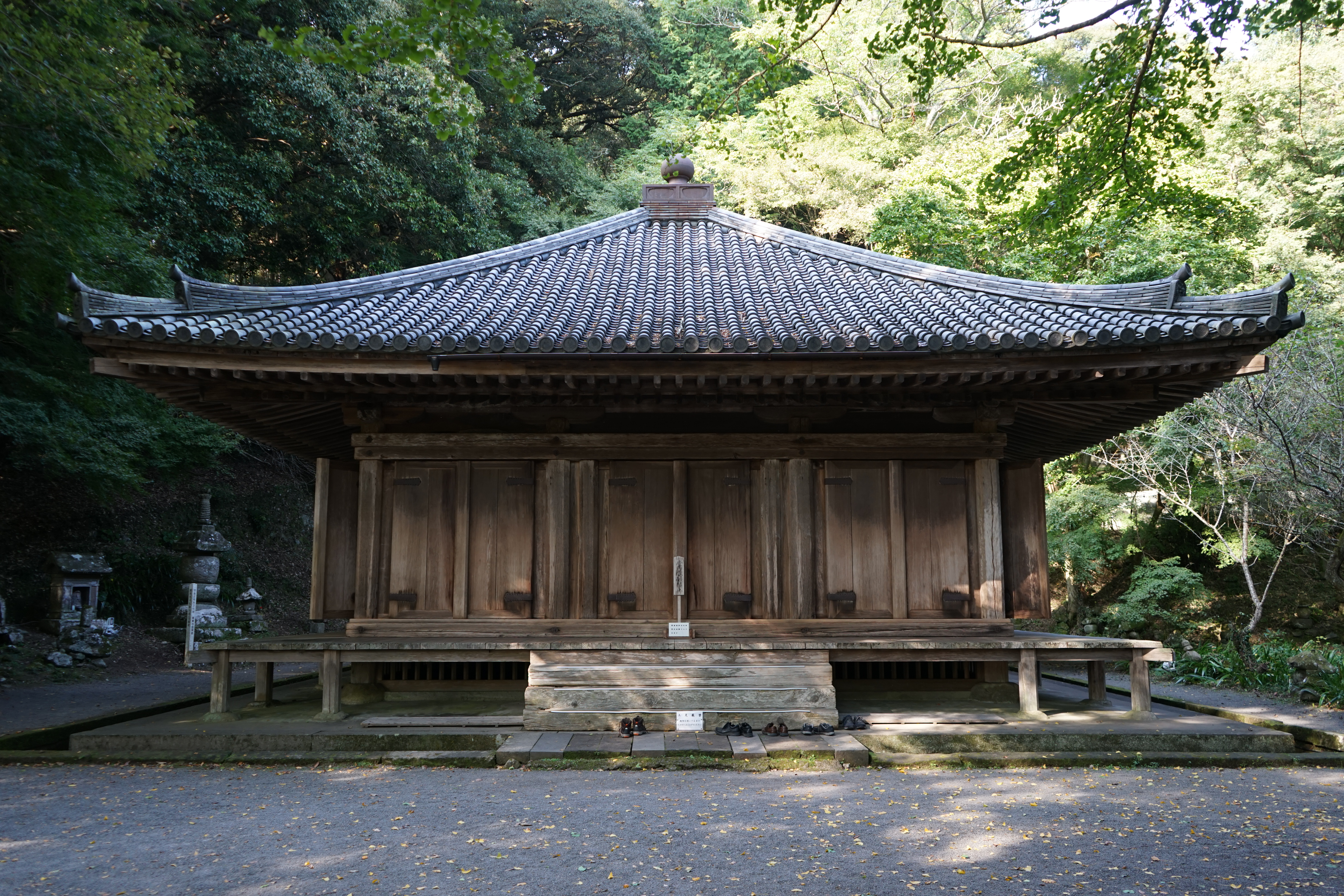
- Fuki-ji O-dō

- Fuki-ji Fuki-ji (Japan)

Religion
- Affiliation: Buddhist
- Deity: Amida Nyorai
- Rite: Tendai

Location
- Location: 2395 Fubuki, Tazome, Bungotakada-shi, Oita-ken
- Country: Japan
- Coordinates: 33°32′15.8″N 131°31′43.5″E

Architecture
- Founder: Ninmon
- National Treasure of Japan

Fuki-ji (富貴寺) is Buddhist temple located in the city of Bungotakada, Ōita Prefecture Japan. it is a temple of the Tendai sect, and its honzon is a statue of Amida Nyorai. Claimed to have been founded in 718 AD, the temple was also called "Amida-ji". The precincts of the temple were designated a National Historic Site in 2013.

== History ==
The Kunisaki Peninsula, where Fuki-ji is located, is a land closely related to Usa Jingū, which was an early center for Shinbutsu-shūgō a syncretistic belief system of Shinto and Japanese Buddhism, from the early Nara period. Fuki-ji, like many other temples on the Kunisaki Peninsula, claims to have been founded in 718 by a monk named Ninmon (仁聞). Ninmon, a mostly a legendary figure, is said to have been associated with the six townships on the Kunisaki Peninsula (Musashi, Kunawa, Kunisaki, Tashibu, Aki), where he founded 28 temples and constructed 69,000 Buddha statues. Due to a lack of historical records from the time, the exact origins of these temples remain mostly unknown.

The temples related to Ninmon in the Kunisaki Peninsula area are collectively called Rokugōyama or Rokugō Manzan. These temples were also an early center and training ground for the Shugendō mountain cults, which flourished especially from the late Nara period and the Heian period. The Rokugōmanzan temples were under the control of Miroku-ji, a Hossō sect temple that was the Jingū-ji of Usa Jingū. In the late Heian period, these temples switched to the Tendai sect. Per a guide dated 1168, Fuki-ji was a place of prayer for successive generations of the Usa clan, the chief priests of Usa Jingū.

At Fuki-ji, there is a mask of an oni with an inscription dating from 1147; therefore the temple existed by this time, but details of what happened before then are unknown. The existing Main Hall is thought to have been built in the 12th century. During the Tenshō era (1573-1592), many Buddhist temples were destroyed by the Kirishitan daimyō Ōtomo Sorin, but the main hall of Fuki-ji was spared. However, it gradually went into decline, and by the mid-Edo period, only the main hall (called here the Ō-dō (大堂)) remained.

== Cultural Properties ==
The Ō-dō was built in the late Heian period, around the 12th century, and is a typical example of Amida-do architecture, as well as the oldest wooden structure in Kyushu. It is designated a National Treasure. The structure is a three-by-four bay hall with chamfered pillars side beams. There are two eaves with tall rafters. The roof is of "treasure-box" style construction and has roof tiles. A Shumidan altar fills the entire inner sanctum, and a seated statue of Amida Nyorai (late Heian period, Important Cultural Property is enshrined on the altar. The walls and pillars are decorated with murals. These paintings are also designated as Important Cultural Properties.

== Access ==
The temple is approximately 40 minutes by car from Oita Airport, or approximately 30 minutes by car from Usa Station on the JR Kyushu Nippō Main Line.

== Events ==
Fuki-ji is known for the ginkgo leaves that surround the temple in autumn which create the appearance of a golden carpet.

== See also ==
- List of Historic Sites of Japan (Ōita)
- List of National Treasures of Japan (temples)
