= Aki, Ōita =

Dissolved municipality in Ōita prefecture, Japan

Aki (安岐町, Aki-machi) was a town located in Higashikunisaki District, Ōita Prefecture, Japan.

As of 2003, the town has an estimated population of 9,856 and the density of 108.61 persons per km^{2}. The total area is 90.75 km^{2}.

On March 31, 2006, Aki, along with the towns of Kunisaki (former), Kunimi and Musashi (all from Higashikunisaki District), was merged to create the city of Kunisaki.
