= Kumano Magaibutsu =

Buddhist statues in Bungotakada, Ōita, Japan

- 熊野磨崖仏 (Japanese)
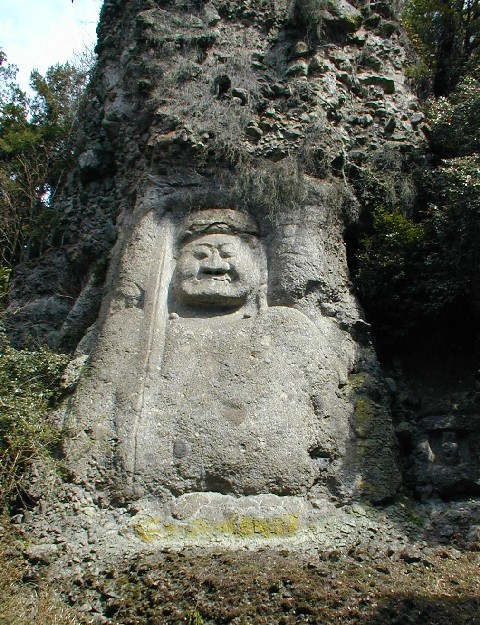
- Kumano Magaibutsu

- Kumano Magaibutsu Kumano Magaibutsu (Japan)
- Interactive map of Kumano Magaibutsu
- 33°28′41.1″N 131°31′32.3″E
- Periods: Heian period
- Location: Bungotakada, Ōita Prefecture, Japan
- Region: Kyushu

Kumano Magaibutsu (熊野磨崖仏) is a group of Buddhist statues carved in bas-relief into a tuff cliff on the Kunisaki Peninsula in Bungotakada, Ōita Prefecture on the island of Kyushu, Japan. In 1955, Kumano Magaibutsu, along with nearby Motomiya Magaibutsu (元宮磨崖仏) and Nabeyama Magaibutsu (鍋山磨崖仏), were designated as a National Historic Sites of Japan. The carvings were designated as a National Important Cultural Property in 1964.

== Overview ==
The term magaibutsu (磨崖仏) refers to a Buddhist figure carved directly into a natural rock faces or cliffside. The Kumano Magaibutsu sculptures are the largest magaibutsu in Japan.

The carvings are located on a cliffside on Mount Tawara (田原山, Tawara-yama), which is sometimes referred to as Mount Nokogiri (鋸山, Nokogiri-san or Nokogiri-yama), in the Tashibu district of Bungotakada. The path which leads to the sculptures begins at Taizo-ji (胎蔵寺) which is located at the base of Mount Tawara.

From the entrance at Taizo-ji, the sculptures can be reached by climbing a long staircase of natural stones. The staircase begins at a torii. A legend says that the 99 steps were built by an oni in a single night. After climbing the staircase, the large statues can be seen carved into the mountain.

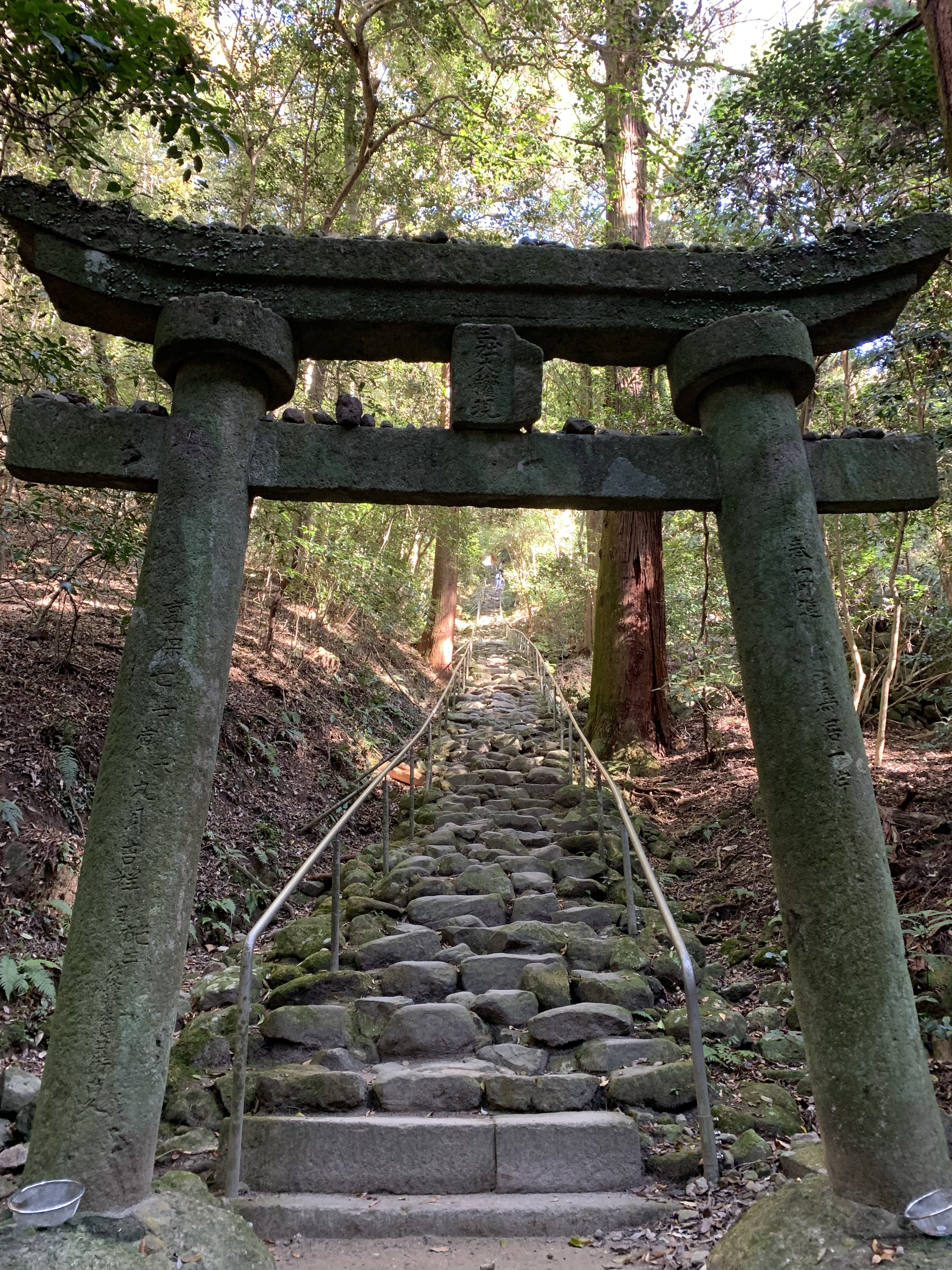
Staircase, said to have been built by an oni in one night, leading to the Kumano Magaibutsu statues

The Kumano Magaibutsu consist of four images carved into the rock wall. The central statue is a half-body statue with a height of approximately 6.8 meters, believed to be that of Dainichi Nyōrai. It is carved into the center of a niche approximately eight meters high. It is unknown when this statues were carved, but stylistically it is estimated to have been created in the mid-Heian period. On the rock that juts out to the left when facing Dainichi Nyorai is a statue of Fudō Myōō, approximately eight meters high, and on the left and right below it are statues of Kongara Dōji and Seitaka Dōji, both approximately three meters high. These images are estimated to have been carved in the early Kamakura period. Behind the statues is a cave where the sculptors are said to have sheltered.

Further up the stone staircase is Kumano Shrine (熊野社) which was once connected to Taizo-ji as a jingū-ji, or mixed shrine and temple complex. Taizo-ji is one of the Rokugo Manzan Tendai sect temples said to be founded during the Nara period. The Rokugo Manzan temples are said to be the birthplace of shibutsu-shūgō, or the syncretism of Shinto and Buddhism. Kumano Shrine and Taizo-ji are now separated as a result of the policies of shinbutsu-bunri instituted during the Meiji era. Taizo-ji also has historic links to Shugendō practices.

Although the statues are estimated to have actually been created during the Heian and Kamakura periods, a legend says that Ninmon (仁聞), a legendary bodhisattva, created the carvings in 718 during the Nara period. This is connected to the legend which says that Ninmon established 28 temples and 29,000 Buddhist statues on the Kunisaki Peninsula in the same year.

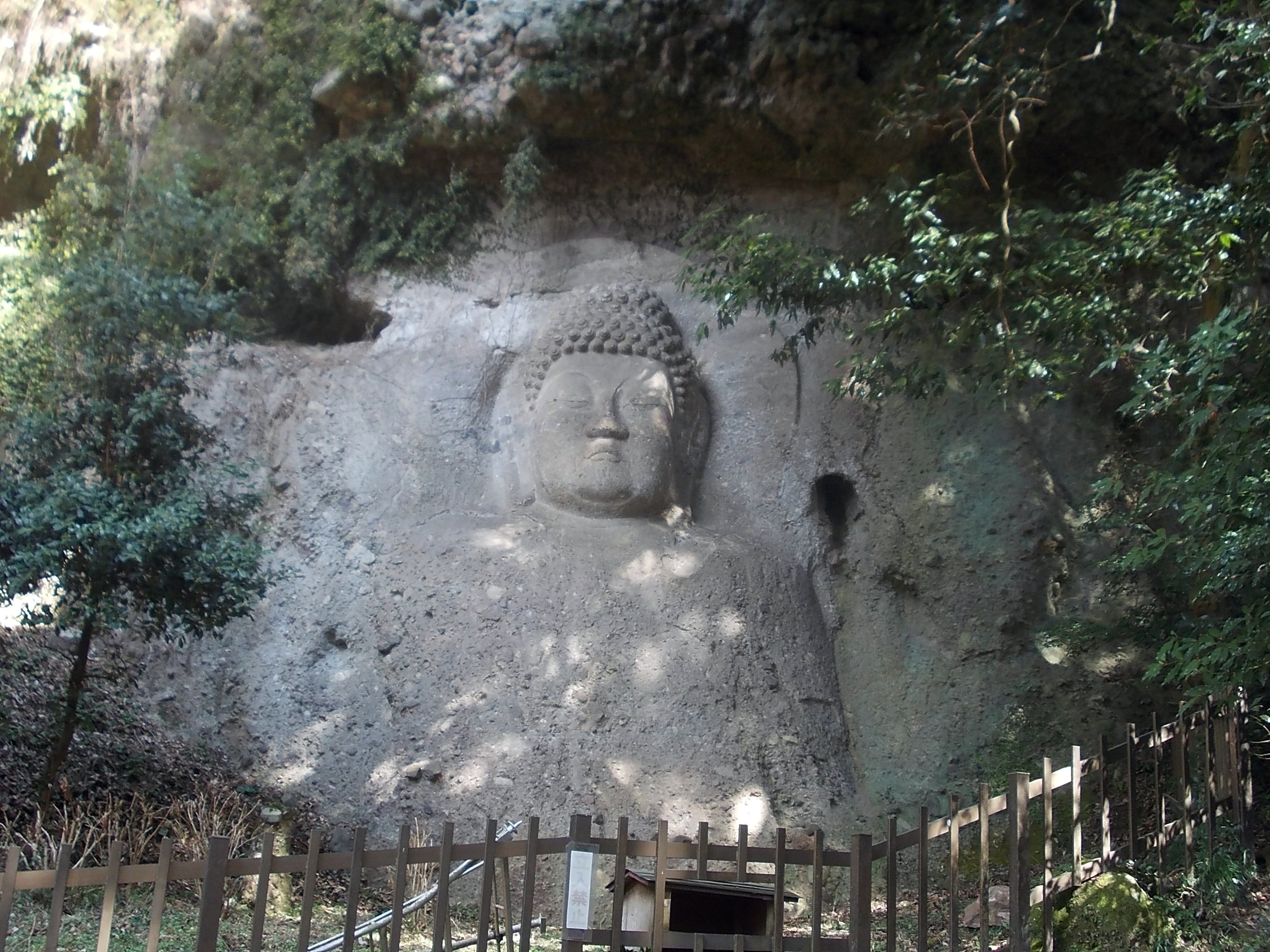
Dainichi-nyorai of Kumano Magaibutsu

=== Access ===
The site is approximately 25 minutes by car from Usa Station which is on the JR Kyushu Nippō Main Line.

== Other Magaibutsu in Bungotakada ==
Motomiya Magaibutsu: also in the Tashibu district of Bungotakada, Motomiya Magaibutsu is believed to have been carved during the Nanboku-chō period. It consists of five thin-walled statues carved into the rock wall to the north of Motomiya Hachiman Shrine. The composition consists of Fudō Myōō in the center, with Gokira Dōji and Bishamonten on the right and Jikokuten and Jizo Bosatsu on the left. The statues are facing towards the east. The Jizo Bosatsu is slightly smaller than the other images, and may be a later addition.

Nabeyama Magaibutsu: located in the Ueno district of Bungotakada, Nabeyama Magaibutsu dates from the late Heian period to early Kamakura period. It consists of a 2.3-meter Fudō Myōō, flanked by Inkara Dōji and Seitaka Dōji, carved into the rock wall at the foot of Mount Nabe, which stands on the banks of the Katsura River that flows through the city of Bungotakada. The images are severely weathered and details have been lost.

== See also ==
- List of Historic Sites of Japan (Ōita)
