= Kimoto =

Kimoto (written: 木本 or 樹元) is a Japanese surname. Notable people with the surname include:

- Kanon Kimoto (木本 花音, born 1997), Japanese idol and singer
- Keisuke Kimoto (木本 敬介, born 1984), Japanese footballer
- Orie Kimoto (樹元 オリエ, born 1979), Japanese actress and voice actress
- Yasuki Kimoto (木本 恭生, born 1993), Japanese footballer
