= Ōyama, Ōita =

Ōyama 大山町
- Town
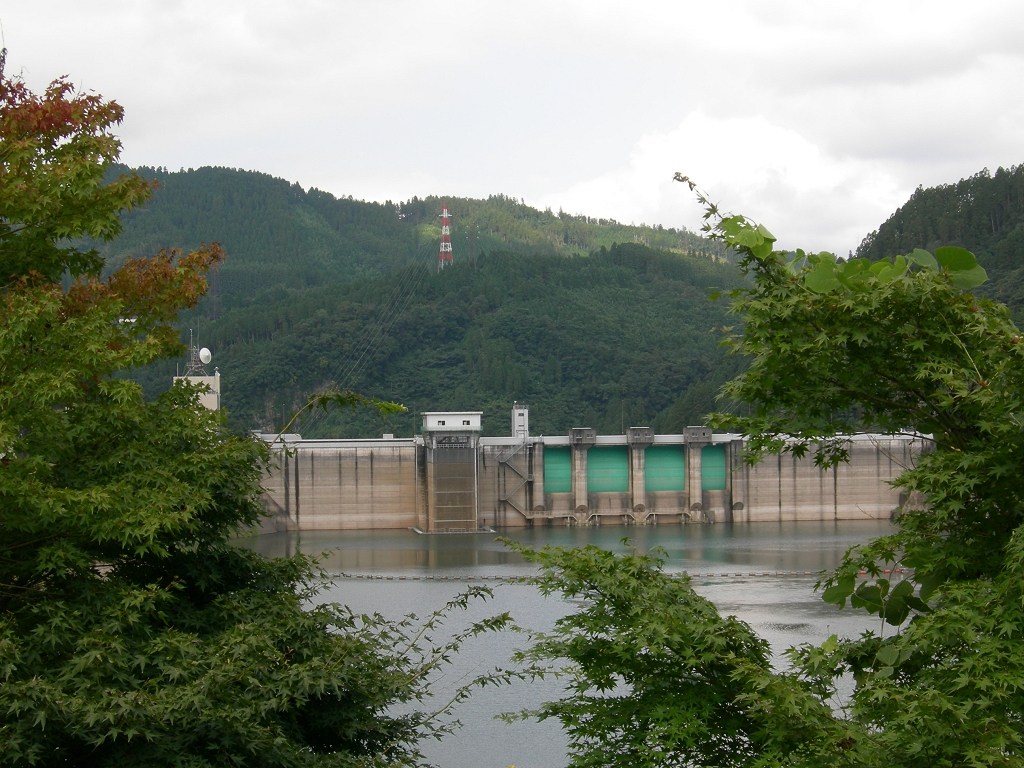
- Matsubara Dam

- Flag Seal
- Interactive map of Ōyama
- Country: Japan
- Region: Kyushu
- Prefecture: Ōita

Area
  - Total: 45.72 km^{2} (17.65 sq mi)

Population (October 1, 2004)
  - Total: 3,646
  - Density: 79.75/km^{2} (206.5/sq mi)
- Time zone: UTC+09:00 (JST)
- City hall address: 877-0295 Oita Prefecture Hita District Oyama Town Nishi Oyama 3545-1
- Climate: Cfa
- Website: Official website (Archived)

Ōyama (大山町, Ōyama-machi) was a town located in Hita District, Ōita Prefecture, Japan.

On March 22, 2005, Ōyama, along with the town of Amagase, and the villages of Kamitsue, Maetsue and Nakatsue (all from Hita District), was merged into the expanded city of Hita.

== Notable residents ==
- Hajime Isayama, Japanese Manga artist and author of Attack on Titan
