= Bungo-Miyoshi Station =

Railway station in Hita, Ōita Prefecture, Japan

Bungo-Miyoshi Station 豊後三芳駅
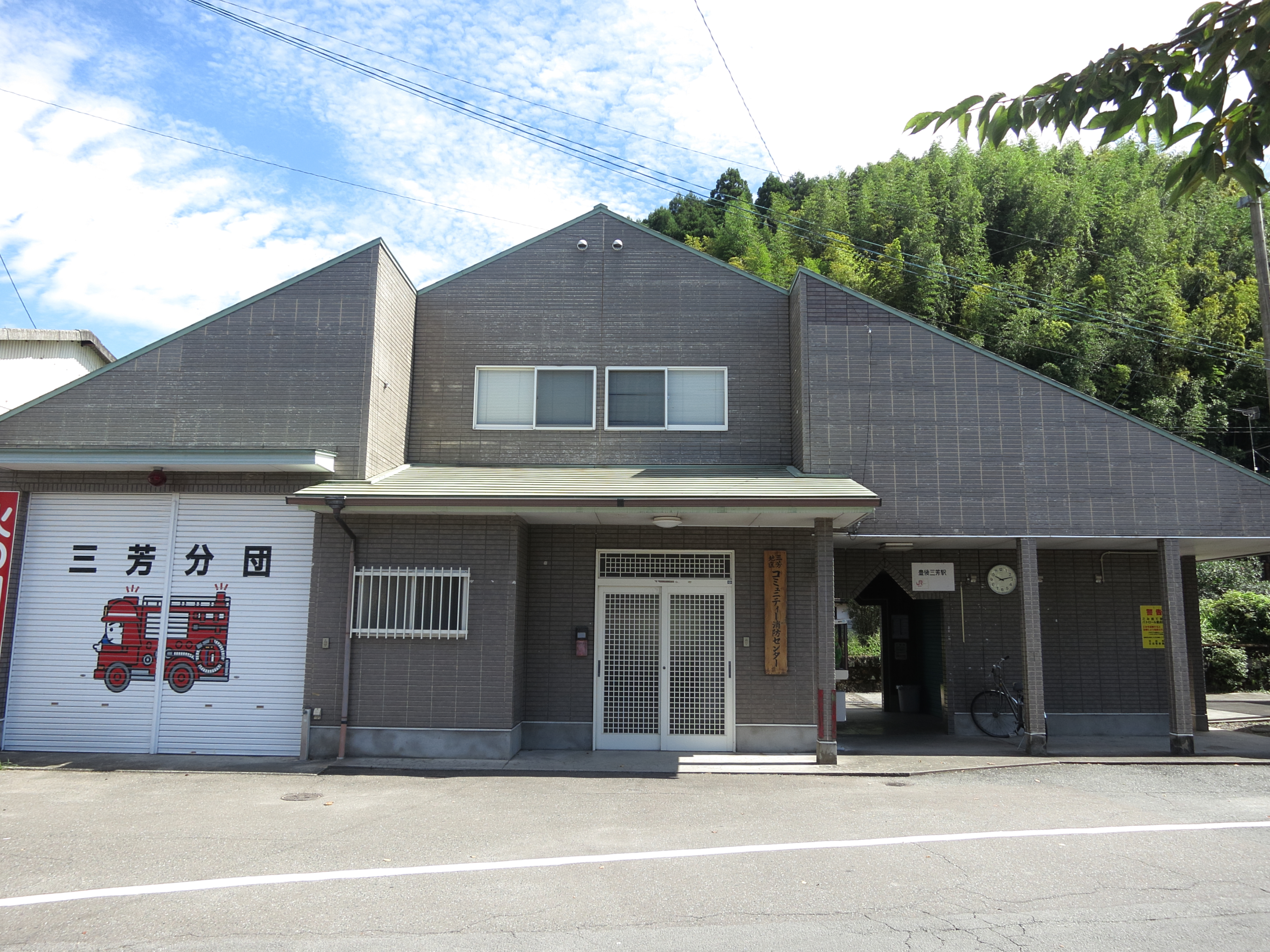
- Bungo-Miyoshi Station in 2017

General information
- Location: Miyoshikobuchimachi, Hita-shi, Ōita-ken 877-0036; Japan
- Coordinates: 33°18′19.68″N 130°57′6.79″E
- Operator: JR Kyushu
- Line: ■ Kyūdai Main Line
- Distance: 49.4 km from Kurume
- Platforms: 1 side platform
- Tracks: 1

Construction
- Structure type: At grade

Other information
- Status: Unstaffed
- Website: Official website

History
- Opened: 15 November 1934

Passengers
- FY2015: 6 daily

Services
| Preceding station | JR Kyushu | Following station |
|---|---|---|
| Hita towards Kurume | Kyūdai Main Line | Bungo-Nakagawa towards Ōita |
Location
- Location within Oita Prefecture Location within Japan

Bungo-Miyoshi Station (豊後三芳駅, Bungo-Miyoshi-eki) is a railway station on the Kyūdai Main Line operated by JR Kyushu in Hita, Ōita Prefecture, Japan.

== Lines ==
The station is served by the Kyūdai Main Line and is located 49.4 km from the starting point of the line at Kurume.

== Layout ==
The station consists of a side platform serving a single track at grade. The unstaffed station building is a modern structure which shares facilities with the local volunteer fire brigade. A short flight of steps lead up to the platform which has a weather shelter.

== History ==
The private Daito Railway (大湯鉄道) had opened a track between Ōita and Onoya in 1915. The Daito Railway was nationalized in 1922, after which Japanese Government Railways (JGR) undertook phased westward expansion of the track which, at the time, it had designated as the Daito Line. By 29 September 1933, the track had reached as far west as Amagase. Separately, JGR had opened the Kyudai Main Line on 24 December 1928 with a track between Kurume and Chikugo-Yoshii and had extended the line east to Hita by 3 March 1934. On 15 November 1934, a link up was achieved between Hita and Amagase, and the entire stretch from Kurume to Ōita was now designated as the Kyudai Main Line. Bungo-Miyoshi opened on the same day as an intermediate station between Hita and Amagase. With the privatization of Japanese National Railways (JNR), the successor of JGR, on 1 April 1987, JR Kyushu took over control of the station.

== Passenger statistics ==
In fiscal 2015, there were a total of 2,334 boarding passengers, giving a daily average of 6 passengers.

== Surrounding area ==
- Danwara Kofun
- Hita City Miyoshi Elementary School

== See also ==
- List of railway stations in Japan
