= 北山田駅 =

北山田駅 is the name of multiple train stations in Japan:

- Kita-Yamada Station
- Kita-Yamata Station
