= Sugikawachi Station =

Railway station in Kusu, Ōita Prefecture, Japan

Sugikawachi Station 杉河内駅
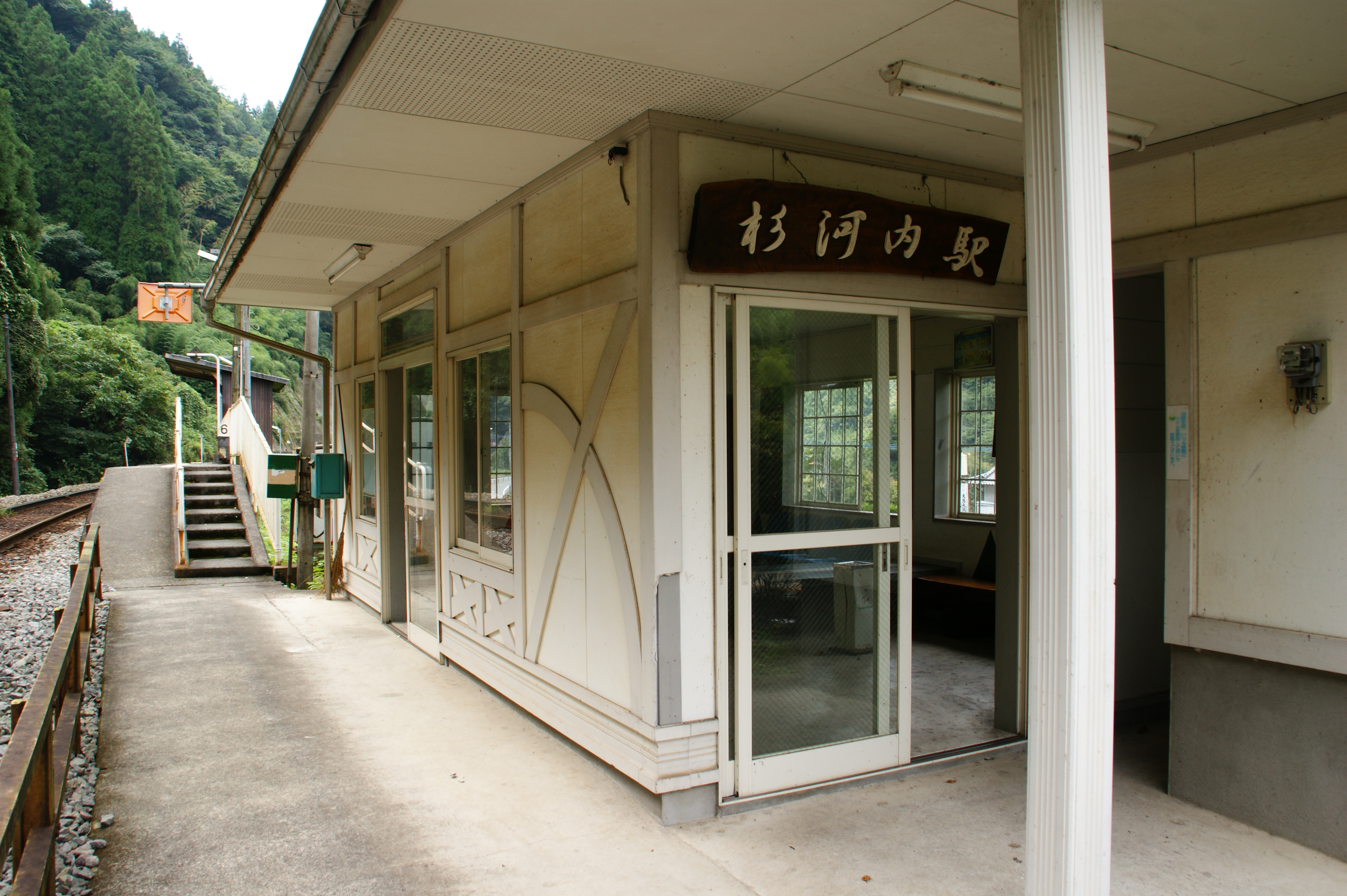
- Sugikawachi Station in 2008.

General information
- Location: Amagasemachi Akaiwa, Hita-shi, Ōita-ken 879-4202; Japan
- Coordinates: 33°15′51.80″N 131°3′56.21″E
- Operator: JR Kyushu
- Line: ■ Kyūdai Main Line
- Distance: 63.6 km from Kurume
- Platforms: 1 side platform
- Tracks: 1

Construction
- Structure type: Side hill cutting

Other information
- Status: Unstaffed
- Website: Official website

History
- Opened: 15 March 1957

Passengers
- FY2015: 10 daily

Services
Preceding station	JR Kyushu	Following station
Amagase towards Kurume	Kyūdai Main Line	Kita-Yamada towards Ōita
Location
- Location within Oita Prefecture Location within Japan

Sugikawachi Station (杉河内駅, Sugikawachi-eki) is a railway station on the Kyūdai Main Line operated by JR Kyushu in the city of Hita, Ōita Prefecture, Japan.

== Lines ==
The station is served by the Kyūdai Main Line and is located 63.6 km from the starting point of the line at Kurume.

== Layout ==
The station consists of a side platform serving a single track on a side hill cutting overlooking the main road and a deep river valley. The station building, a modern structure built of timber, is unstaffed and serves only as a waiting room. From the access road, a flight of steps or a long slope leads up to the station building. Another ramp or flight of steps leads to a slightly higher level where the platform is located.

== History ==
Japanese National Railways (JNR) opened the station on 15 March 1957 as an additional station on the existing track of the Kyudai Main Line. With the privatization of JNR on 1 April 1987, JR Kyushu took over control of the station.

== Passenger statistics ==
In fiscal 2015, there were a total of 3,465 boarding passengers, giving a daily average of 10 passengers.

== Surrounding area ==
- Jion Falls - visible from the train window
- Japan National Route 210

== See also ==
- List of railway stations in Japan
