= Maetsue, Ōita =

Dissolved municipality in Ōita prefecture, Japan

Maetsue (前津江村, Maetsue-mura) was a village located in Hita District, Ōita Prefecture, Japan.

As of 2003, the village had an estimated population of 1,598 and the density of 20.23 persons per km^{2}. The total area was 78.99 km^{2}.

On March 22, 2005, Maetsue, along with the towns of Amagase and Ōyama, and the villages of Kamitsue and Nakatsue (all from Hita District), was merged into the expanded city of Hita.
