= Nakatsue, Ōita =

Nakatsemura 中津江村
- village (a part of Hita City)
- Nakatuemura
- Coordinates: 33°8′10.4″N 130°56′14.5″E
- Country: Japan
- Region: Kyushu
- Prefecture: Ōita Prefecture
- City: Hita City
- Time zone: UTC+9 (JST)

Nakatsue (中津江村, Nakatsue-mura) was a village located in Hita District, Ōita, Japan.

As of 2003, the village had an estimated population of 1,300 and the density of 15.87 persons per km^{2}. The total area was 81.91 km^{2}.

On March 22, 2005, Nakatsue, along with the towns of Amagase and Ōyama, and the villages of Kamitsue and Maetsue (all from Hita District), was merged into the expanded city of Hita.

The town attracted national attention when it served as the base camp for the Cameroon national football team before the 2002 FIFA World Cup. When the team arrived several days behind schedule, the town's plight briefly became a top news story in Japan.
