= Taio gold mine =

Mine in Ōita Prefecture, Japan

Taiyo mine
- Interactive map of Taiyo mine
- Location: Hita, Ōita, Ōita Prefecture, Japan; 33.139°N 130.894°E
- Products: Gold, Silver
- Opened: 1896
- Closed: 1972

The Taio mine (Japanese:鯛生金山) was the large gold mine in Oita, Japan. At its peak productivity between 1934 and 1938, it produced 2.3 tons of gold per year, being the most productive gold mine of Japan. Tunnels stretch for 500 meters below ground level, and total tunnels length is 110 km, although all tunnels below 4th are flooded. From 1983, the mine has become a museum, with 800-meter tunnel section opened to the visitors.

== Picture gallery ==
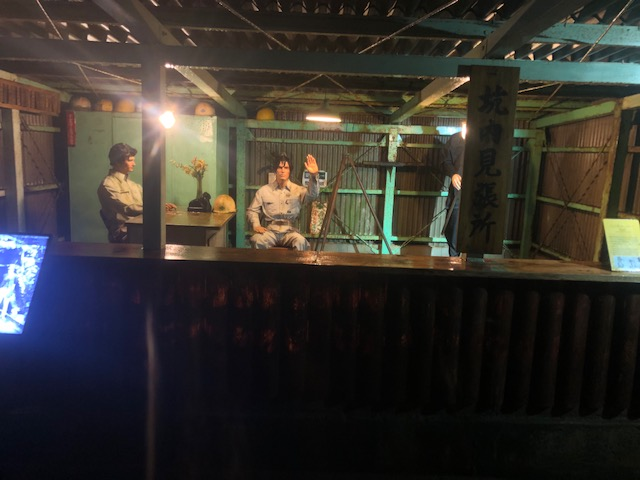
Security check station at the entrance of Taio mine (sculptural composition instead of live men)

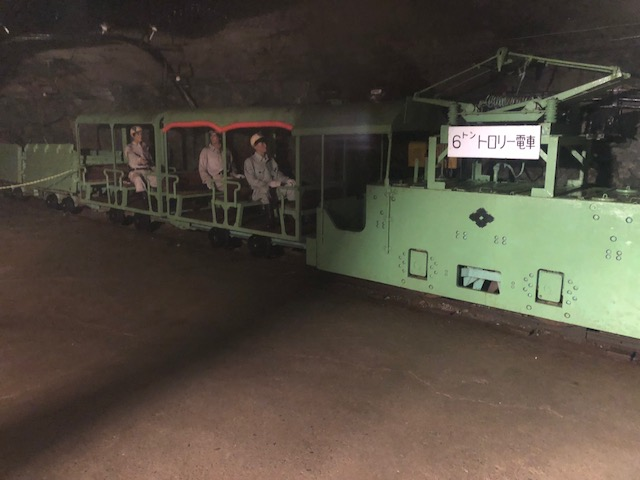
Rail car (statues instead of actual miners)

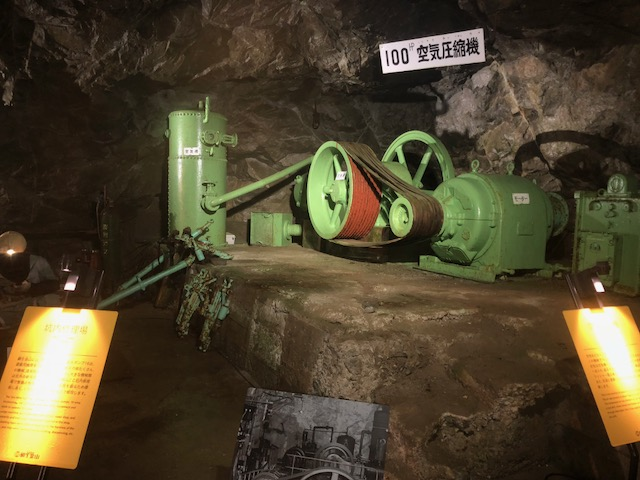
Pumping equipment in the 3rd gallery of Taio mine

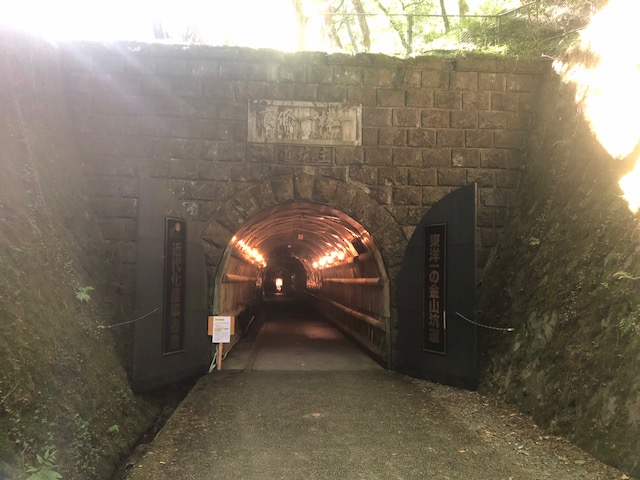
Entrance gate of the Taio mine

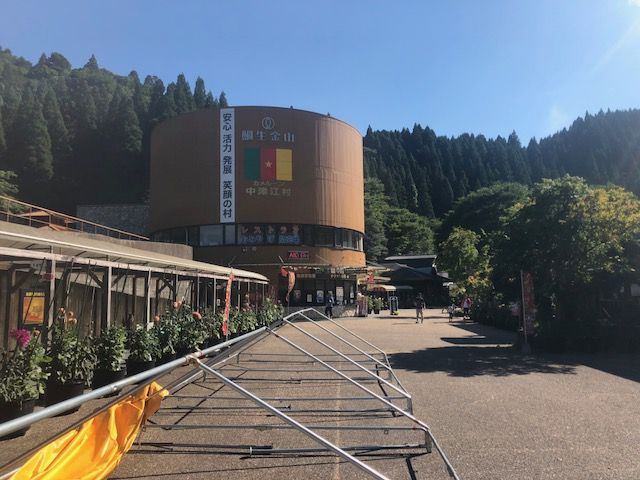
Taio mine shopping, Center: (cylindrical building): Taio mine museum
