= Kamitsue, Ōita =

Dissolved municipality in Ōita prefecture, Japan

Kamitsue (上津江村, Kamitsue-mura) was a village located in Hita District, Ōita Prefecture, Japan.

As of 2003, the village had an estimated population of 1,258 and the density of 14.21 persons per km^{2}. The total area was 88.53 km^{2}.

On March 22, 2005, Kamitsue, along with the towns of Amagase and Ōyama, and the villages of Maetsue and Nakatsue (all from Hita District), was merged into the expanded city of Hita.
