= Junko Maya =

Japanese actress (1942–2017)

- 真屋 順子
- Born: Shoko Iwao (岩尾 詔子, Iwao Shōko); 8 January 1942; Busan, Korea, Empire of Japan
- Died: 28 December 2017 (aged 75)
- Other names: Shoko Takatsu (高津 詔子, Takatsu Shōko; real name)
- Education: Ōita Prefectural Hita High School
- Occupation: Actress
- Known for: Ohana-han; Akai Kizuna; Kin-chan no Doko Made Yaru no!?
- Spouse: Sumio Takatsu (m. 1969; died 2010)

Junko Maya (真屋 順子, Maya Junko; 8 January 1942 – 28 December 2017) was a Japanese actress. Her skill was Buyō.

== Personal life ==
Maya was born in Busan, Korea during the Japanese colonial era, and grew up in Hita, Ōita, Japan. She married actor Sumio Takatsu (高津住男) in 1969; he died of liver cancer in 2010.

Maya died on 28 December 2017 from a stroke.

== Filmography ==
=== Films ===
Year	Title	Role	Notes
1968	Ōkanbu Burai	Setsuko Asami	
1976	Shi-nen San-kumi no Hata		
1979	Trouble Man Warau to Korosu zo		
1984	Tropical Mystery Seishun Kyōwakoku		
1994	Aozora ni Ichiban Chikai Basho	Oba-chan	

=== Dramas ===
Year	Title	Role	Network	Notes
1965	Tamayura		NHK	
1965	Ningyō sa Shichi Torimonochō		NHK	
1965	Hanketsu		TV Asahi	Episode 137
1965	Kiiroi Fūdo		TV Asahi	
1966	Hyōten		TV Asahi	Episodes 4 to 7
1966	Ohana-han		NHK	
1966	Tokai no kao: William Irish "Maboroshi no On'na" Yori		NHK	
1966	The Guardman		TBS	Episodes 43, 206, and 292
1967	Zenigata Heiji		Fuji TV	
1967	Momotarō-zamurai	Osuzu	NTV	
1967	Ore wa Yōjinbō	Oyae	TV Asahi	Episode 21
1968	Tsuma no Kagaribi	Yayoi Matsuzaki	TBS	Lead role
1969	Ten to Chi to	Yaya	NHK	Taiga drama
1969	Playgirl		TV Tokyo	
1969	Three Outlaw Samurai	Chie	Fuji TV	6th series, Episode 24
1970	Onihei Hanka-chō	Onobu	TV Asahi	Episode 50
1970	Key Hunter		TBS	Episode 115
1970	Tokugawa On'naemaki		KTV	Episodes 9 and 10
1971	Daichūshingura		TV Asahi	Episodes 20 and 21
1971	Gun Hyōe Meyasu-bako	Otaka	TV Asahi	Episode 14
1972	Mito Kōmon	Kumi Takabayashi	TBS	Episode 27
1972	Shin Heike Monogatari	Office teacher	NHK	Taiga drama
1972	Kōya no Moto Rōnin	Yae	TV Asahi	Episode 32
1972	Yo Naoshi Bugyō		TV Asahi	Episode 10
1972	Daikon no Hana		TV Asahi	
1973	Ōoka Echizen	Senjuhime	TBS	Episode 31
1973	Mama wa Rival		TBS	
1973	Jigoku no Tatsu Torimono Hikae		TV Asahi	Episode 23
1973	Taiyō ni Hoero!		NTV	Episodes 36, 116, and 210
1973	Akahige	Okiwa	NHK	Episode 44
1973	Hissatsu Shioki Hito	Chomaru	ABC	Episode 20
1974	Oshidori Ukyō Torimono-sha	Oyo	ABC	Episode 7
1975	Yaregasa-gatana Fune Akunin Kari		TV Asahi	Episodes 59 and 95
1975	Ōedo Sōsamō	Oshizuka	TV Tokyo	Episode 223
1977	Ningyō sa Shichi Torimonochō	Okume	TV Asahi	
1977	Akai Kizuna	Toki Shime	TBS	
1978	Sono Machi o Kese!	Akiko Morita	NHK	
1978	Princess Comet		TBS	
1980	Ai Love Nakkī	Haru Morishita	TBS	
1982	Samishī no wa Omae Dake Janai	Tsukinojo Hanamura	TBS	
1982	Yoi Don		NHK	Narration
1991	Jinan Jijo Hitorikko Monogatari	Kyoko Sakurai	TBS	
1995	Mei Bugyō Tōyama no Kin-san	Tae Hittori	TV Asahi	7th series, Episode 11
1996	Hitorikurashi		TBS	
1999	Kanojotachi no Jidai		Fuji TV	

=== Variety series ===
Year	Title	Network	Notes
	Kin-chan no Doko Made Yaru no!?	TV Asahi	
1994	Egao to Egao	MMT	

=== Advertisements ===
Year	Title	Notes
	Lion Mamaremon	
1987	Yamato Transport Hikkoshi Service	
