= Hita, Ōita =

Hita 日田市
- City
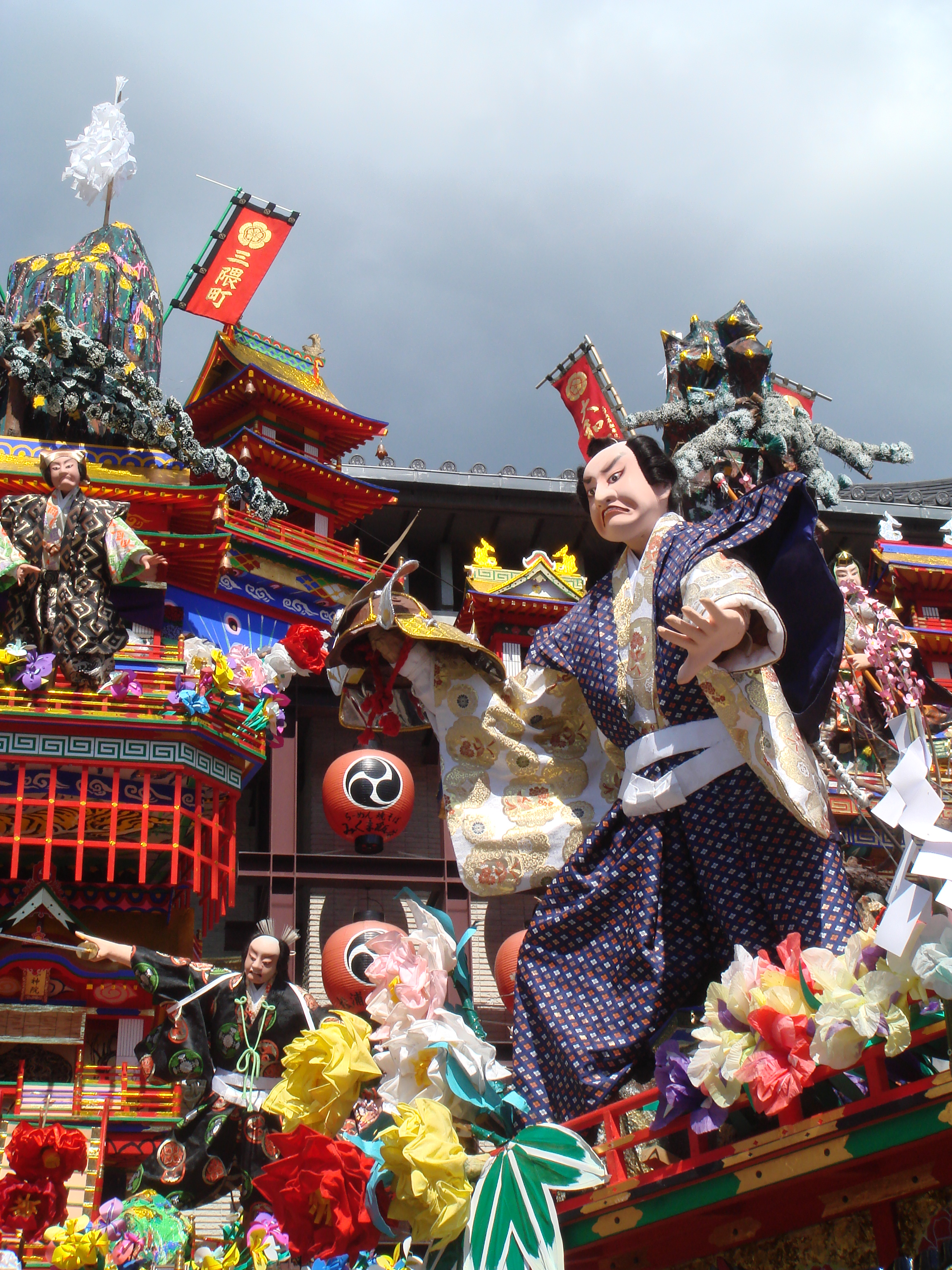

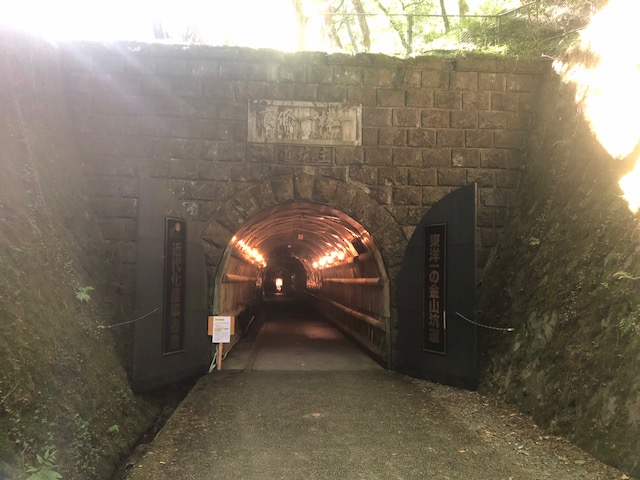

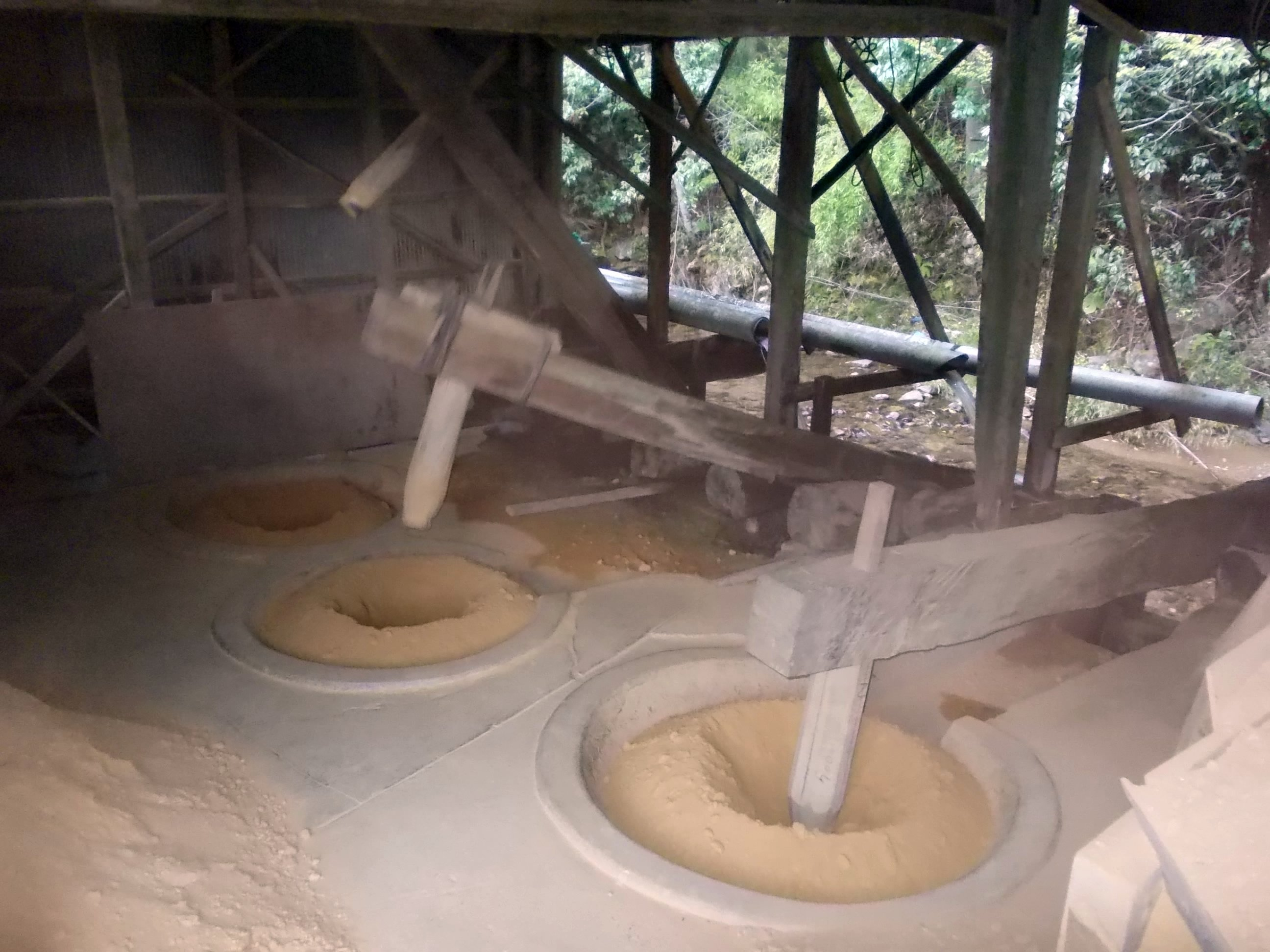

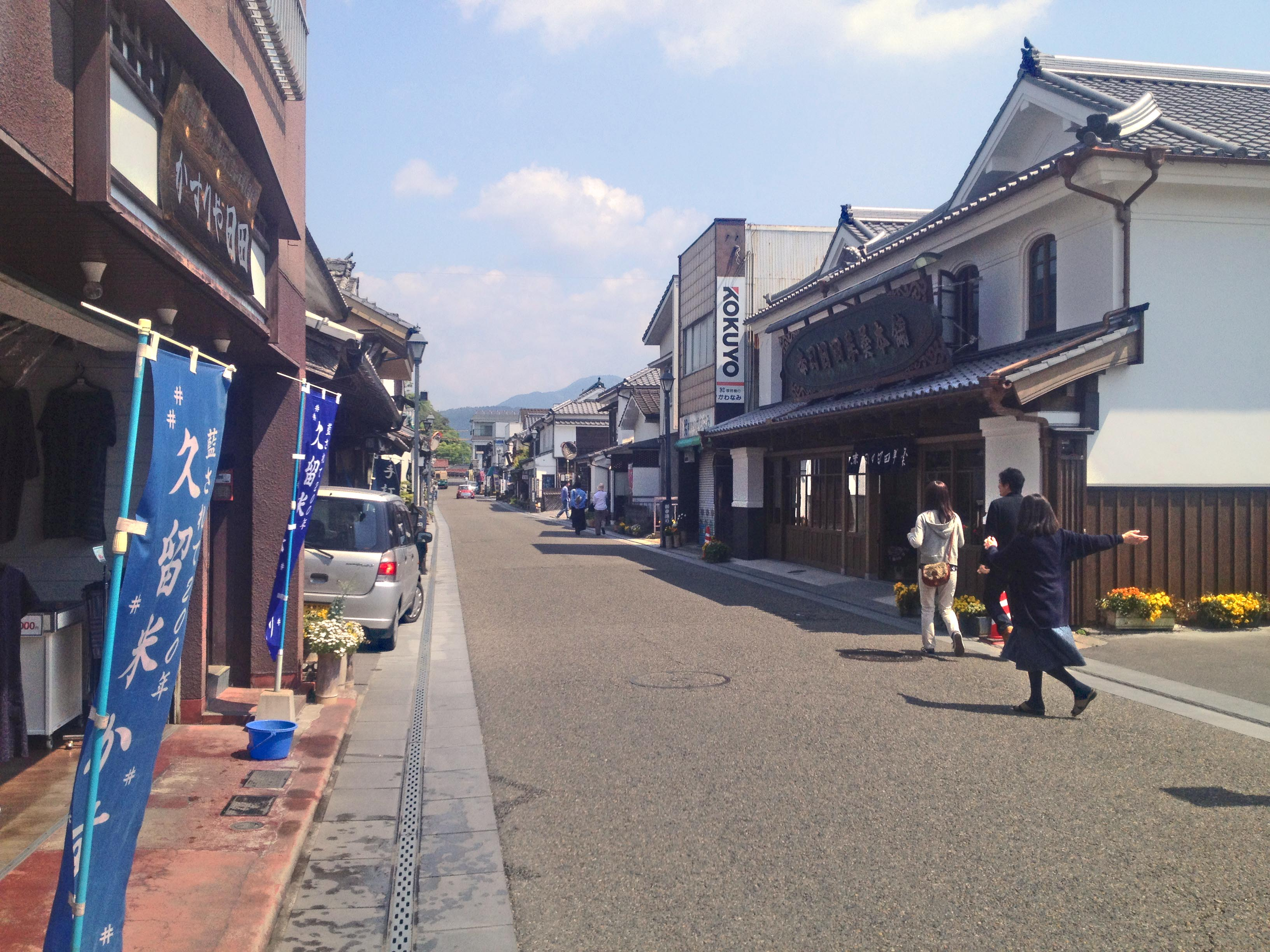

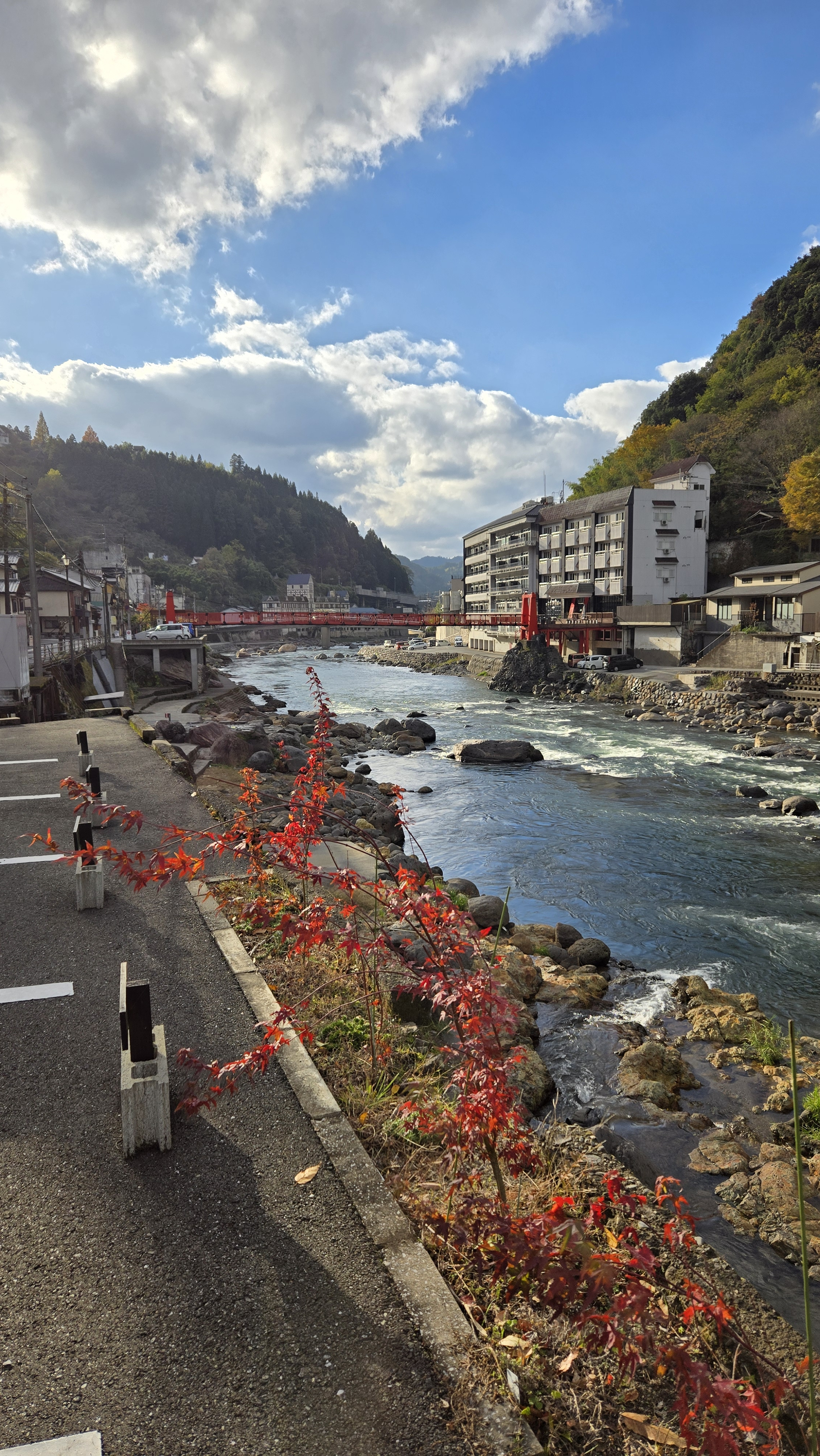
Hita Gion Festival
Taio Kanayama	Onta ware
Mameda	Amagase Onsen
- Flag Emblem
- Interactive map of Hita
- Location in Japan
- Coordinates: 33°19′17″N 130°56′28″E
- Country: Japan
- Region: Kyushu
- Prefecture: Ōita

Government
  - Mayor: Michiko Mukuno

Area
  - Total: 666.03 km^{2} (257.16 sq mi)

Population (November 30, 2023)
  - Total: 61,148
  - Density: 91.810/km^{2} (237.79/sq mi)
- Time zone: UTC+09:00 (JST)
- City hall address: 2-6-1 Tashima, Hita-shi, Ōita-ken 877-8601
- Climate: Cfa
- Website: Official website
- Symbols
- Bird: Wagtail
- Flower: Iris
- Tree: Camellia sasanqua

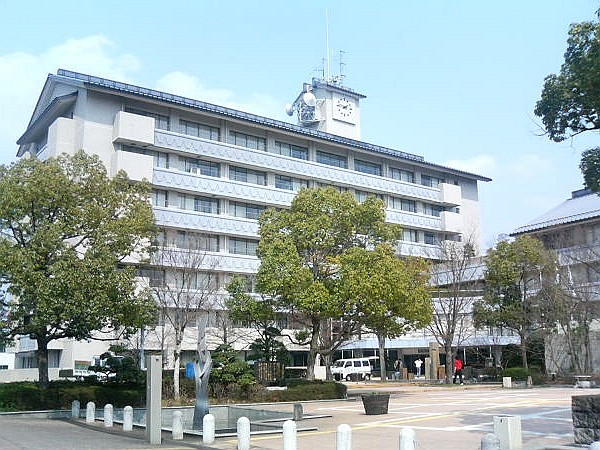
Hita City Hall

Hita (日田市, Hita-shi) is a city located in Ōita Prefecture, Japan. As of 30 November 2023, the city had an estimated population of 61,148 in 27,556 households, and a population density of 96 persons per km^{2}. The total area of the city is 666.03 km^{2} (257.16 sq mi).

== Geography ==
Hita is located in the far west of Ōita Prefecture, and borders the neighboring prefectures of Fukuoka and Kumamoto. Surrounding cities include Kurume to the west, Nakatsu to the north, and Kusu to the east. Hita is a natural basin surrounded by mountains, with several rivers that eventually become the Chikugo River. Due to this connection, although Hita is placed within Ōita Prefecture, it shares a historical connection to Fukuoka Prefecture. The dialect used in Hita has characteristics of the Hichiku dialect used in Fukuoka, Nagasaki, and Saga Prefectures.

Many rivers that run through Hita join up to the Mikuma River, and later the Chikugo River. These rivers were used to distribute lumber to Kurume and Ōkawa at the end of the Edo Period, but with the completion of the Yoake Dam, the use of this route stopped.

The mountains surrounding the Hita basin reach 1000 meters (3,281 ft) above sea level, while some mountains around Nakatsue, Maetsue, and Kamitsue reach 1200 meters (3,937 ft) above sea level.

=== Surrounding municipalities ===
Fukuoka Prefecture

- Asakura
- Soeda
- Tōhō
- Ukiha
- Yame

Kumamoto Prefecture

- Aso
- Kikuchi
- Minamioguni
- Oguni
- Yamaga

Ōita Prefecture

- Kusu
- Nakatsu

=== Climate ===
Average temperatures and rainfall in Hita

Hita has a humid subtropical climate (Köppen climate classification Cfa). As a basin, the change in temperature from day to night during summer and winter is steep. Hita has a high annual precipitation rate, with over one third of the rain falling during the rainy season months of June and July. Heavy rainfall is frequent, and severe flood damage has occurred in the past. From spring to autumn, a deep fog known locally as sokogiri (底霧, shallow ground fog) often appears in the morning.

Summer gets very hot, with temperatures often rising above 35 °C (95 °F), while winter gets notably cold. At times the temperature falls to −5 °C (23 °F). Hita gets more snow than average for Ōita Prefecture. While snow inside the main city area accumulates to less than 10 centimetres (3.9 in) a year, the mountain regions can accumulate more than 30 centimetres (12 in) of snow.

In the Maetsue mountain area the precipitation rate is high. While this helps grow the Japanese cedar and Japanese cypress trees used in the forestry industry, it also causes landslides.

Climate data for Hita, Ōita (1991−2020 normals, extremes 1942−present)
Month	Jan	Feb	Mar	Apr	May	Jun	Jul	Aug	Sep	Oct	Nov	Dec	Year
Record high °C (°F)	21.5 (70.7)	25.2 (77.4)	28.2 (82.8)	31.5 (88.7)	36.3 (97.3)	37.1 (98.8)	40.0 (104.0)	39.9 (103.8)	38.0 (100.4)	35.7 (96.3)	29.6 (85.3)	24.7 (76.5)	40.0 (104.0)
Mean maximum °C (°F)	16.6 (61.9)	19.9 (67.8)	23.7 (74.7)	28.5 (83.3)	32.4 (90.3)	33.9 (93.0)	36.6 (97.9)	37.2 (99.0)	34.9 (94.8)	29.9 (85.8)	24.8 (76.6)	18.7 (65.7)	37.5 (99.5)
Mean daily maximum °C (°F)	9.8 (49.6)	11.8 (53.2)	15.7 (60.3)	21.5 (70.7)	26.4 (79.5)	28.5 (83.3)	32.3 (90.1)	33.5 (92.3)	29.5 (85.1)	24.1 (75.4)	18.1 (64.6)	12.1 (53.8)	21.9 (71.5)
Daily mean °C (°F)	4.2 (39.6)	5.6 (42.1)	9.2 (48.6)	14.5 (58.1)	19.4 (66.9)	23.0 (73.4)	26.8 (80.2)	27.4 (81.3)	23.6 (74.5)	17.6 (63.7)	11.6 (52.9)	6.1 (43.0)	15.7 (60.4)
Mean daily minimum °C (°F)	−0.2 (31.6)	0.5 (32.9)	3.6 (38.5)	8.2 (46.8)	13.3 (55.9)	18.6 (65.5)	22.7 (72.9)	23.1 (73.6)	19.2 (66.6)	12.5 (54.5)	6.5 (43.7)	1.5 (34.7)	10.8 (51.4)
Mean minimum °C (°F)	−5.1 (22.8)	−4.6 (23.7)	−2.8 (27.0)	0.8 (33.4)	6.8 (44.2)	13.0 (55.4)	19.3 (66.7)	19.7 (67.5)	13.1 (55.6)	5.9 (42.6)	−0.1 (31.8)	−4.0 (24.8)	−5.9 (21.4)
Record low °C (°F)	−10.8 (12.6)	−9.9 (14.2)	−7.8 (18.0)	−4.4 (24.1)	1.2 (34.2)	7.1 (44.8)	12.7 (54.9)	14.1 (57.4)	5.9 (42.6)	−0.2 (31.6)	−4.9 (23.2)	−7.8 (18.0)	−10.8 (12.6)
Average precipitation mm (inches)	64.6 (2.54)	81.4 (3.20)	122.9 (4.84)	128.1 (5.04)	150.0 (5.91)	352.1 (13.86)	376.9 (14.84)	189.1 (7.44)	178.7 (7.04)	87.4 (3.44)	81.5 (3.21)	63.6 (2.50)	1,876.3 (73.87)
Average snowfall cm (inches)	6 (2.4)	4 (1.6)	0 (0)	0 (0)	0 (0)	0 (0)	0 (0)	0 (0)	0 (0)	0 (0)	0 (0)	1 (0.4)	11 (4.3)
Average precipitation days (≥ 1.0 mm)	8.7	9.1	10.5	9.7	8.7	13.2	12.6	10.7	9.3	6.9	7.8	8.2	115.4
Average snowy days (≥ 1 cm)	2.1	1.4	0.1	0	0	0	0	0	0	0	0.1	0.2	3.9
Average relative humidity (%)	76	72	70	67	67	74	76	74	76	75	78	78	74
Mean monthly sunshine hours	112.7	126.0	156.7	177.1	189.7	127.1	161.6	189.3	151.2	163.8	133.1	115.3	1,811
Source: Japan Meteorological Agency

=== Demographics ===
Per Japanese census data, the population of Hita in 2020 is 62,657 people. Hita has been conducting censuses since 1920.

Historical population

Year	Pop.	±%
1920	65,119	—
1925	69,202	+6.3%
1930	73,270	+5.9%
1935	77,614	+5.9%
1940	78,172	+0.7%
1945	92,416	+18.2%
1950	96,836	+4.8%
1955	99,948	+3.2%
1960	98,651	−1.3%
1965	94,121	−4.6%
1970	87,102	−7.5%

Year	Pop.	±%
1975	83,649	−4.0%
1980	83,880	+0.3%
1985	83,655	−0.3%
1990	81,580	−2.5%
1995	79,776	−2.2%
2000	77,369	−3.0%
2005	74,165	−4.1%
2010	70,922	−4.4%
2015	66,523	−6.2%
2020	62,657	−5.8%

Hita population statistics

== History ==
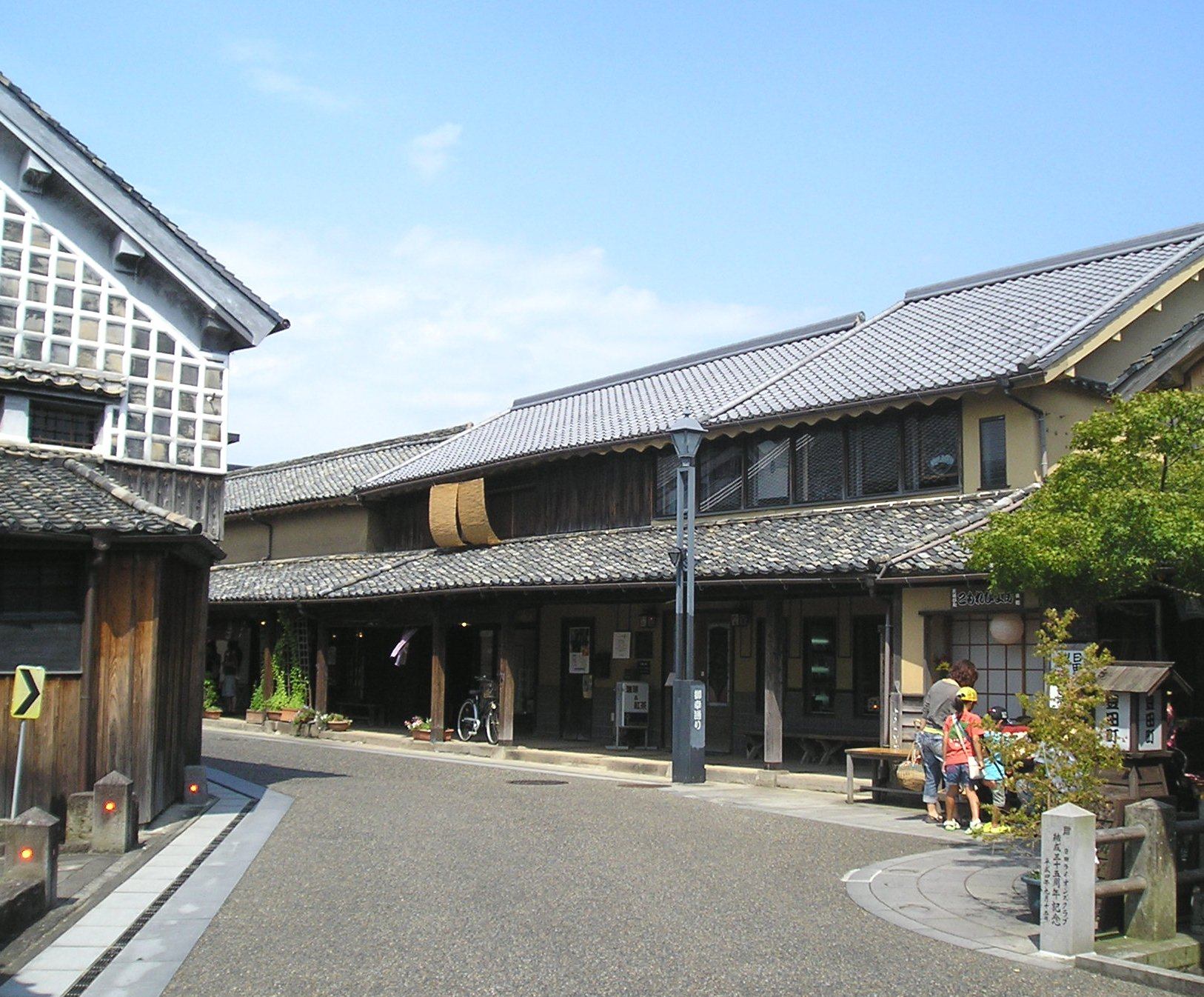
Mameda town

The area of Hita was part of ancient Bungo Province. It is mentioned in the Bungo no Kuni Fudoki, which was compiled between 720 and 740, which states that Emperor Keiko visited this area during his expedition to Kyushu. Numerous Kofun period ruins indicate the presence of a powerful local kingdom in late prehistoric times. During the Edo period it was divided between Mori Domain and tenryō territory ruled directly by the Tokugawa shogunate. After the Meiji restoration, the towns of Mameda (豆田町 ) and Kuma (隈町) within Hita District, Ōita were established on May 1, 1889 with the creation of the modern municipalities system. On November 1, 1901 the two towns merged to form the town of Hita. On December 11, 1940 Hita merged with the villages of Miyoshi, Mitsuoka, Takase, Asahi, Mihana, and Nishiarita merge to form the city of Hita. On March 31, 1955 the villages of Higashiarita, Ono, Otsuru, Yoake, and Gowa were annexed by the city of Hita.

On March 22, 2005, the towns of Amagase and Ōyama, and the villages of Kamitsue, Maetsue and Nakatsue (all from Hita District) were merged into Hita. With this merger, the borders of the city of Hita were now the same as the original district of Hita, and the district was abolished.

== Government ==
Hita has a mayor-council form of government with a directly elected mayor and a unicameral city council of 22 members. Hita contributes three members to the Ōita Prefectural Assembly. In terms of national politics, the city is part of the Ōita 2nd district of the lower house of the Diet of Japan.

== Economy ==
Forestry has long flourished in Hita due to the abundant tree supply in the surrounding mountains. Japanese cedar trees called "Hita Cedar" are used to make geta and lacquerware. In recent years the forest industry has declined as a result of the importation of cheap foreign lumber.

From the 1960s, after large areas of cultivated land became difficult to obtain, agriculture in Hita has been shifting its focus from rice to crops grown in the mountains, such as ume, Japanese chestnuts, and mushrooms.

A fishing industry is present, with ayu and other fish captured in the Mikuma River.

Hita is well-known for its high quality water. Hita Tenryosui produces mineral water, and many distilleries produce sake and shōchū.

Recently, companies such as TDK, Kyushu Sumidenso, Sapporo Breweries, and Sanwa Shurui have expanded manufacturing in the area.

=== Traditional crafts ===
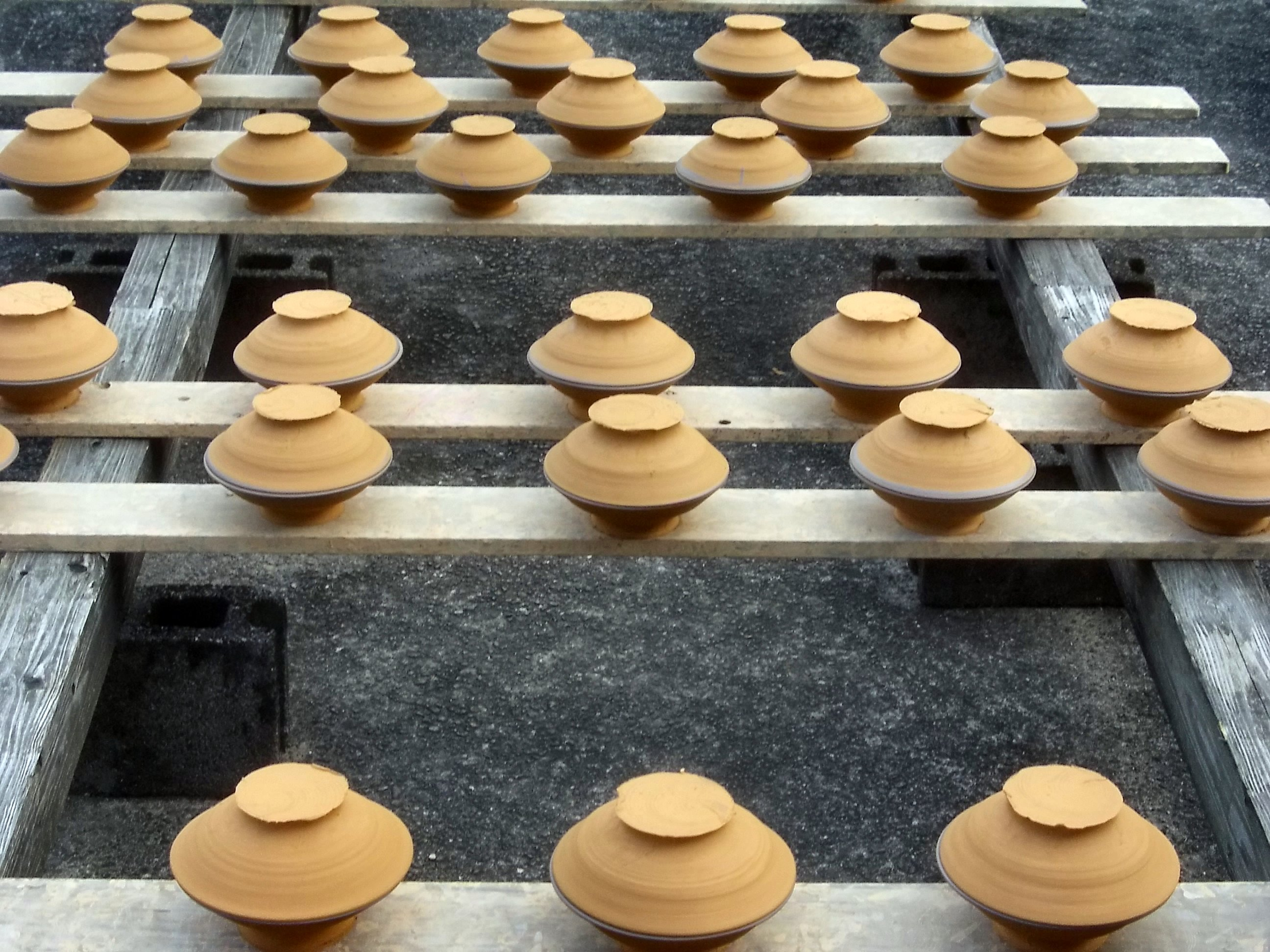
Onta Pottery drying in the sun.

- Wooden geta, made from the trees surrounding Hita
- Onta ware, pottery created in the mountain village of Onta

== Education ==
Hita has 18 public elementary schools and 12 public junior high schools operated by the city government and three public high schools operated by the Ōita Prefectural Board of Education. There are also two private high schools.

== Transportation ==
=== Railways ===
JR Kyushu - Kyūdai Main Line

- Yoake - Teruoka - Hita - Bungo-Miyoshi - Bungo-Nakagawa - Amagase

JR Kyushu - Hitahikosan Line

- Yoake - Imayama - Ōtsuru (Note: As a result of the July 2017 Northern Kyushu heavy rain damage, rail service on the Hitahikosan Line has been replaced by a Bus rapid transit service.)

=== Highways ===
- Ōita Expressway
- National Route 210
- National Route 211
- National Route 212
- National Route 386
- National Route 387
- National Route 442
- National Route 496

== Local attractions ==
=== Tourism ===
During the Edo period, Hita was modeled after Kyoto and its merchant culture, and even now is nicknamed "Little Kyoto". Traces of old Kyoto are apparent in the streets of Mameda-machi (豆田町), a town where buildings of the time period have been preserved. Prominent buildings include the Hirose Museum (廣瀬資料館), the Kusano House (草野本家), the Nihongan Medicine Museum (日本丸館), and the Tenryō Hita Museum (天領日田資料館). There is also the Kuncho Shuzō Sake Brewery (薫長酒蔵資料館), which has a museum and shop.

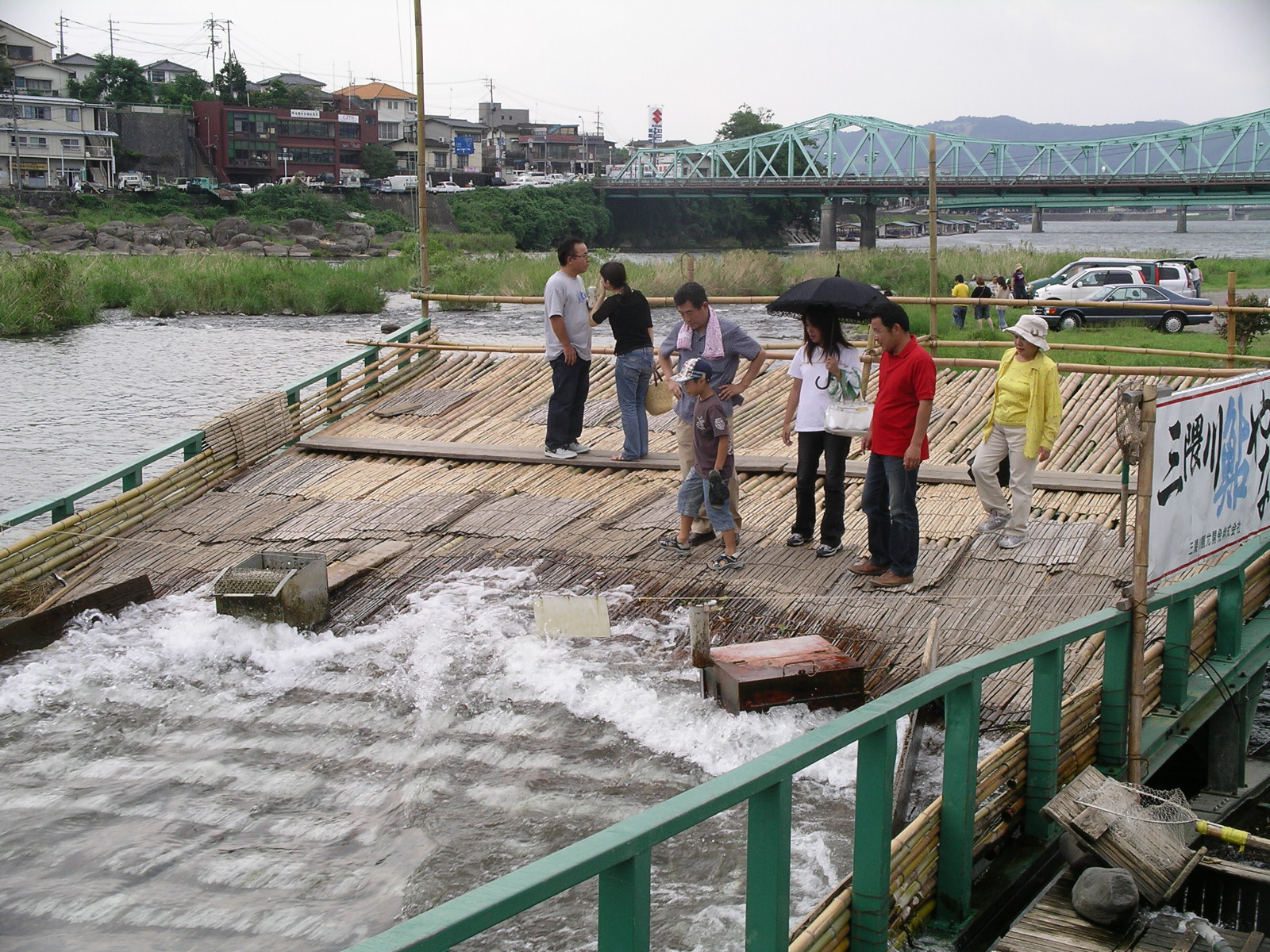
An ayuyana fishtrap in Hita

Kangien (咸宜園跡) was a private school built by Hirose Tansō in 1805. The school's name means "everyone is welcome," and students from all over Japan came to study in Hita, regardless of age, gender, or social status. Kangien has been designated as a Japan Heritage site and two buildings remain standing: Shūfūan (秋風庵) and Enshirō (遠思楼). An education research center has also been built at the site.

Taio gold mine is located in Nakatsue village; the mine was in operation from 1898 to 1972, but now remains as a museum.

From July to November, fishermen erect bamboo fish traps in the Mikuma River to capture ayu fish, which are covered in salt and grilled.

Hita has many onsen hot springs, particularly along the Mikuma River and in Amagase.

The former village of Kamitsue is home to international racing circuit Autopolis

The luxury Aru Ressha train was designed by Eiji Mitooka. It runs between Ōita and Hita and is in service to also revive tourism and the local economy.

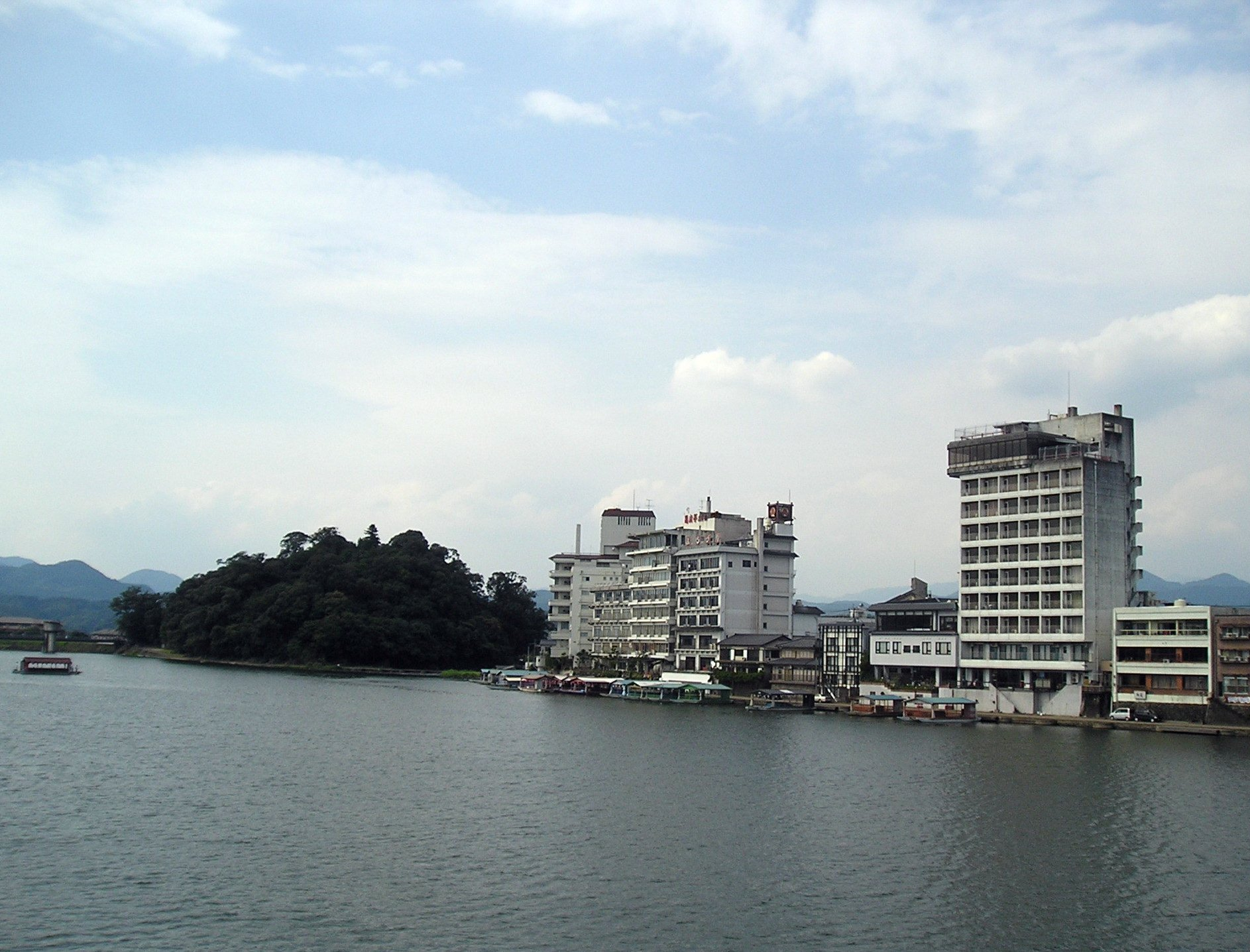
The Mikuma River running through Hita. Hita Hot Springs in the centre picture and Kizan Park in the foreground.

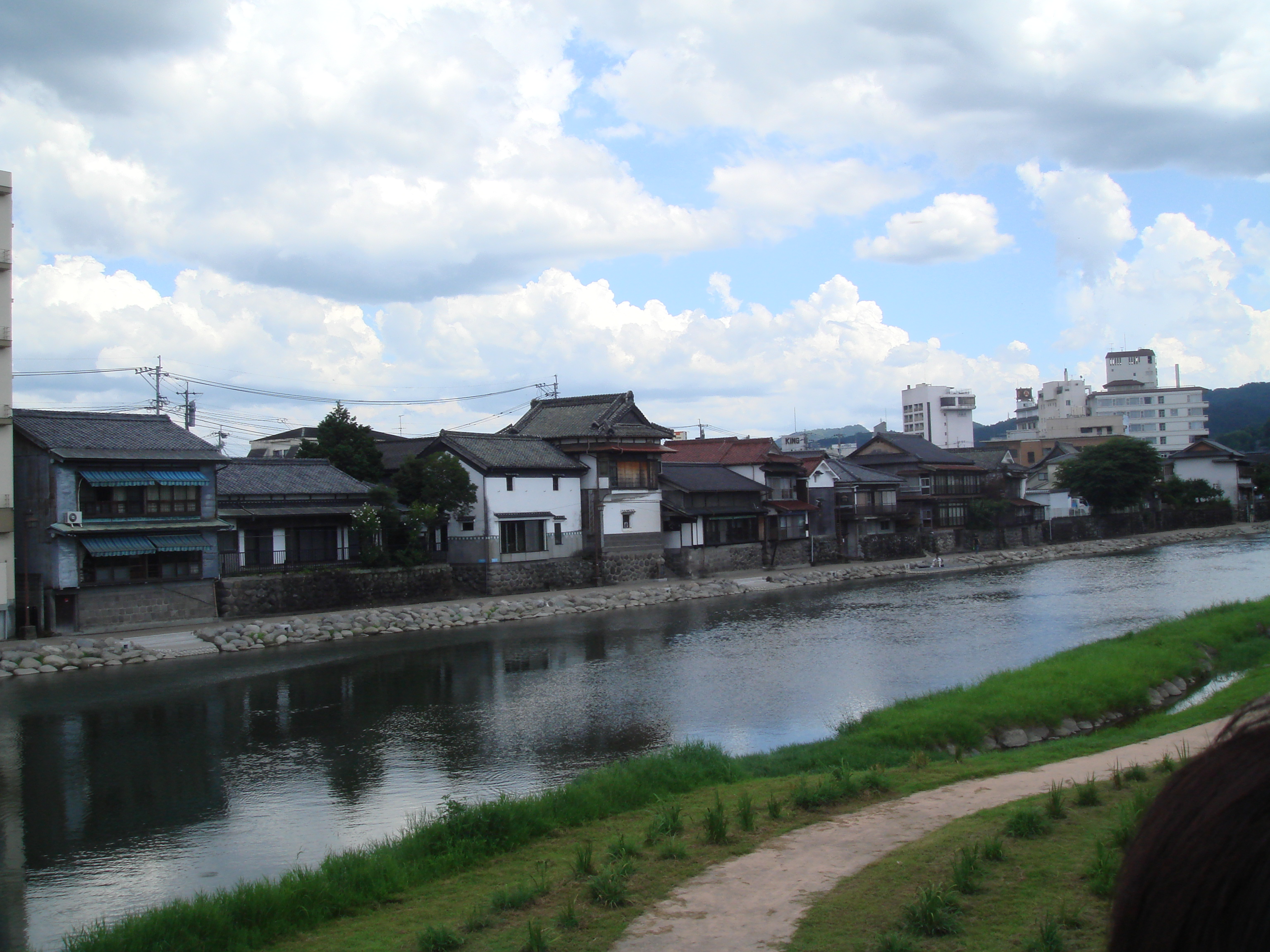
Old street of Kuma

=== Festivals ===
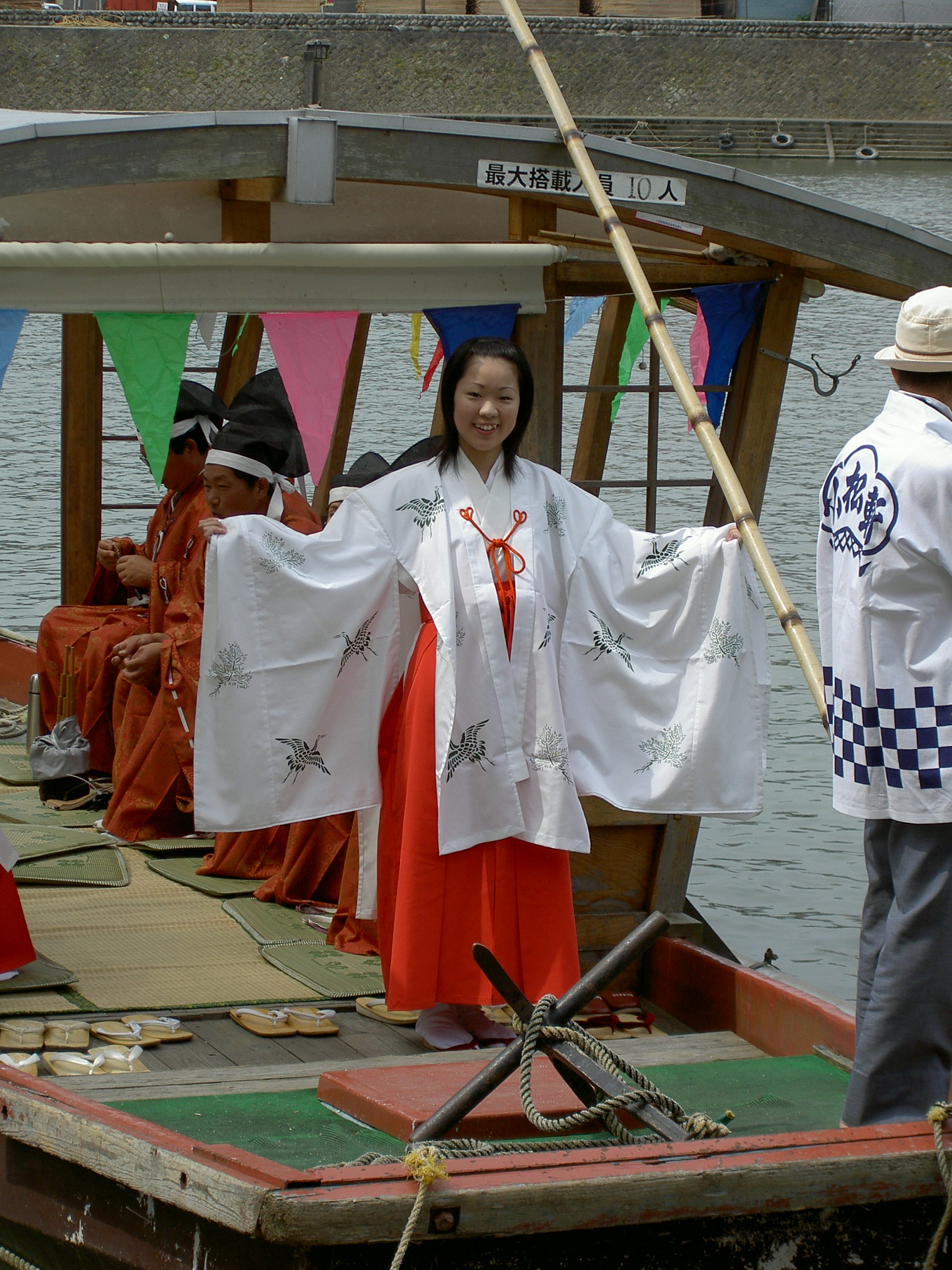
A miko at the Kankōsai River Opening Festival

Hita has many festivals throughout the year that attract a steady stream of visitors.

Tenryō Hita Ohina Festival

Tenryō Hita Ohina Festival (天領日田おひなまつり) is a girl's doll festival held every year from February 15 through March 31, around the time of the national Hinamatsuri. During this festival, the museums and old houses of Mameda-machi and Kuma-machi open their doors to the public and display their collection of dolls.

Hita Kawabiraki Kankōsai River Opening Festival

Hita Kawabiraki Kankōsai (日田川開き観光祭), or River Opening Festival, is held the first weekend after May 20. This festival celebrates the start of the ayu fishing season on Mikuma River, and more than 10,000 fireworks are launched over the river in a two-day firework display.

Hita Gion Festival

Hita Gion Festival (日田祇園祭) is held the first weekend after July 20. It is modeled after the Gion Festival in Kyoto. Huge wooden yamaboko floats (up to 12m high) from different areas of the city are pushed around the streets by volunteers. These floats can also be seen at the Gion Yamaboko Hall (日田祇園山鉾会館) in Kuma-machi throughout the year.

Sen-nen Akari Bamboo Light Festival

Sen-nen Akari (千年あかり) is held from Friday to Sunday during the third week in November. On these three nights, bamboo lights illuminate the streets of Mameda-machi and the neighboring Kagestu River. The festival began in 2005.

Hita Tenryō Festival

Hita Tenryō Festival (日田天領まつり) is held the third weekend in November. This festival celebrates Hita's Edo period, when it was under direct Tokugawa supervision. The highlight is a procession of 200 people through the city in full Edo-period costume. The name of the festival comes from the phrase tenryō, used to describe such direct Tokugawa landholdings (Hita was part of the territory overseen by the saigoku gundai, the deputy of the western provinces).

=== Cuisine ===
Hita has many local specialty foods. One of the most famous is Hita Yakisoba, a noodle dish prepared in a unique manner that makes it crispier than standard yakisoba. Takanazushi is a kind of sushi made with takana (a leaf mustard) and nori. The seasoning yuzukoshō is theorized to have been first made in Hita.

== Notable people from Hita ==
- Hajime Isayama (manga artist and writer, most notably known for Attack On Titan)
- Keisuke Kimoto (Football player)
- Koji Kuramoto (judo athlete)
- Sayami Matsushita (archer)
- Junko Maya (actress)
- Kaoru Mitoma (Football player)
- Hirose Tansō (scholar and writer)
