= Hajime Isayama =

Japanese manga artist (born 1986)

- 諫山 創
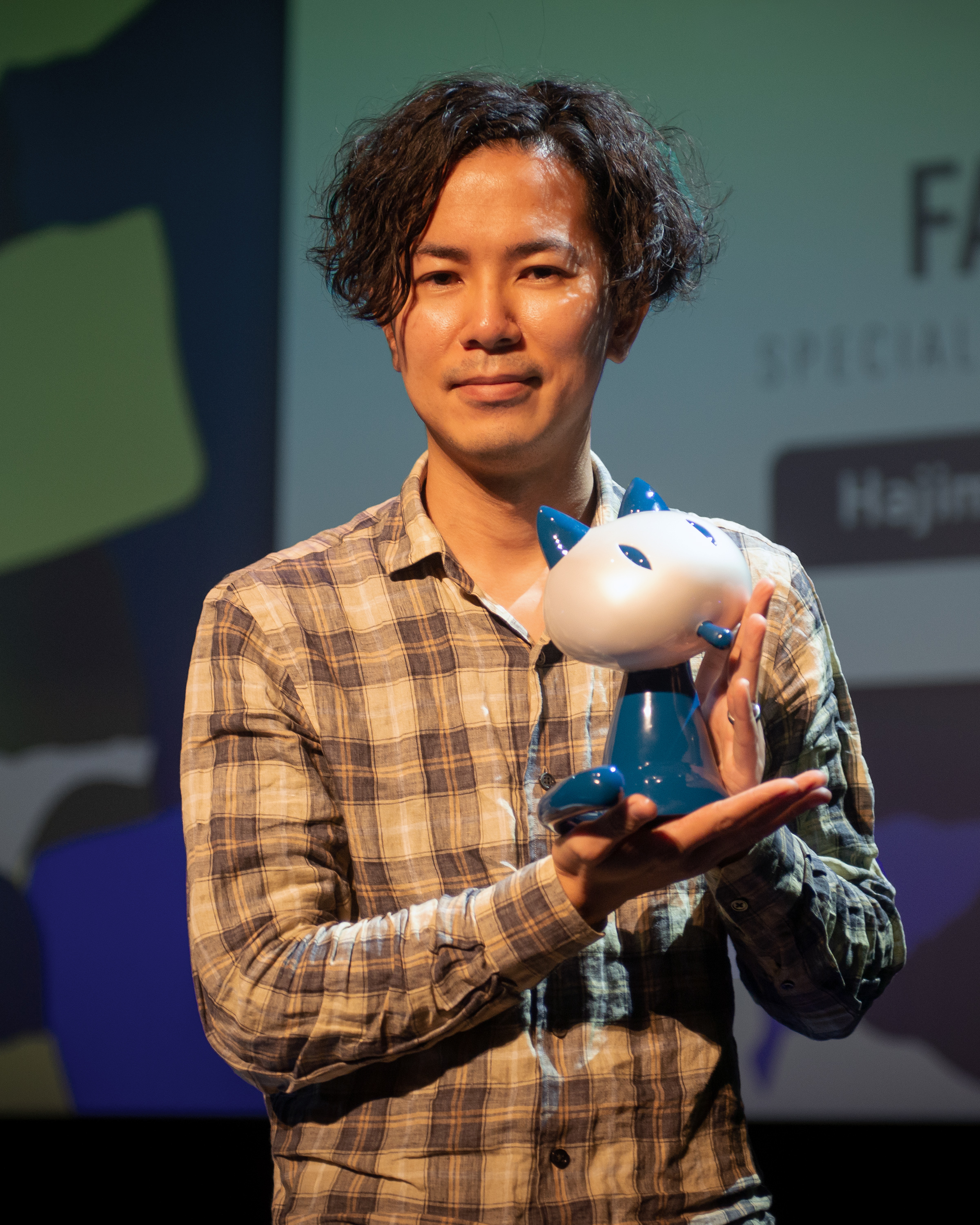
- Isayama at the Angoulême International Comics Festival in 2023
- Born: August 29, 1986 (age 40); Ōyama, Ōita, Japan
- Occupation: Manga artist
- Years active: 2006–present
- Known for: Attack on Titan
- Spouse: Unknown (m. 2018)
- Awards: Kodansha Manga Award (2011); Harvey Award (2014)

Hajime Isayama (Japanese: 諫山 創, Hepburn: Isayama Hajime; born August 29, 1986) is a Japanese manga artist. His first series, Attack on Titan (2009–2021), became one of the best-selling manga series of all time with 140 million copies in circulation as of November 2023. He was awarded the Kodansha Manga Award in 2011, a Harvey Award in 2014, and was honored with the Fauve Spécial award at the 50th Angoulême International Comics Festival in 2023.

== Early life and career ==
Isayama was born in Ōyama, Ōita Prefecture, Japan, which is now part of Hita City. He was attending Hita Rinko Senior High School when he began submitting manga works to contests. After graduating, he matriculated in the manga design program of the arts department at Kyushu Designer Gakuen. In 2006, he applied for the Magazine Grand Prix known as MGP promoted by Kodansha Ltd. and a short version of Attack on Titan (Shingeki no Kyojin) was given the "Fine Work" award. This one-shot would later be included with the first Blu-ray of the anime adaptation. At age twenty, he moved to Tokyo and worked at an Internet café in order to pursue a career in writing manga.

Originally, he offered his work to the Weekly Shōnen Jump department at Shueisha, where he was advised to modify his style and story to be more suitable for Weekly Shōnen Jump. He declined and decided instead to take it to the Weekly Shōnen Magazine department at Kodansha Ltd.

In 2008, he applied for the 80th Weekly Shōnen Magazine Freshman Manga Award, where his work Heart Break One was given the Special Encouragement Award. His other work, Orz, was chosen as a selected work in the same contest the following year.

In 2009, his first serial work, Attack on Titan, started in the monthly Bessatsu Shōnen Magazine. It won the Shōnen category of the 35th Kodansha Manga Award in 2011, and was nominated for both the 4th annual Manga Taishō award and the 16th annual Tezuka Osamu Cultural Prize. Attack on Titan is released in English by Kodansha USA and has inspired five spin-off manga series, three light novel series, a televised anime adaptation, several visual novels and video games, and a two part live-action film. The resort Bungo Oyama Hibiki no Sato in his hometown of Ōyama, ran a free exhibit displaying copies of Isayama's manuscripts for the manga in 2013. A special Attack on Titan event was held in Hita on November 1, 2014, with Isayama and approximately 2,500 spectators attending. The following day, Isayama gave a speech at the Patria Hita cultural hall and was named the Tourism Ambassador of Hita by the city's mayor Keisuke Harada. In December 2018, he announced in his blog that he had gotten married earlier that year. In November 2022, Isayama made his first-ever appearance in the United States at Anime NYC, an anime convention in New York City.

== Works ==
Title	Year	Publisher(s)	Notes	Ref.
Attack on Titan (進撃の巨人 Shingeki no Kyojin)	2006		One-shot version	
Heart Break One (ハート ブレイク ワン Hāto Bureiku Wan)	2008		One-shot	
Orz	2008		One-shot	
Attack on Titan (進撃の巨人 Shingeki no Kyojin)	2009–2021	Kodansha (Japanese); Kodansha USA (English)	Manga	
Attack on Titan Inside (進撃の巨人 INSIDE 抗 Shingeki no Kyojin Inside Kou)	2013		Character profiles, interviews	
Attack on Titan Outside (進撃の巨人 OUTSIDE 攻 Shingeki no Kyojin OUTSIDE Osamu)	2013		Concept art, interviews. Includes a draft from chapter 1 (2009)	
Attack on Avengers	2014	Brutus (Japanese); Colossal Edition Vol. 2 by Kodansha USA (English)	Crossover with Marvel Comics. Story by Isayama, art by Axel Alonso and Joe Quesada.	
The Killing Pawn (ザ・キリング・ポーン Za Kiringu Pōn)	2014		One-shot; art by Ryōji Minagawa. This was later added to Minagawa's short story collection "Tensousha"(2021).	
The Theory of Ill-Natured Men and AI (性悪男とAIのセオリー Showaru Otoko to AI no Theory)	2025	Kodansha	One-shot; art by Kai Noshigami, featuring a character created by Yuki Kaji.	

== Awards ==
Year	Award	Category	Work/Nominee	Result
2006	Magazine Grand Prix	Fine Work	Attack on Titan (one-shot version)	Won
2008	80th Weekly Shōnen Magazine Freshman Manga Award	Special Encouragement Award	Heart Break One	Won
2008	81st Weekly Shōnen Magazine Freshman Manga Award	Selected Work	Orz	Won
2011	4th Manga Taishō Awards	Best Manga	Attack on Titan	Nominated
2011	35th Kodansha Manga Award	Best Shōnen Manga	Attack on Titan	Won
2012	16th Tezuka Osamu Cultural Prize	Grand Prize	Attack on Titan	Nominated
2013	20th Anime & Manga Grand Prix	Best Hope Manga	Attack on Titan	Won
2013	19th Saló del Manga de Barcelona	Best Shōnen Manga	Attack on Titan	Won
2013	6th Bros Comic Award	Grand Prize (Animated Comic)	Attack on Titan	Won
2014	18th Tezuka Osamu Cultural Prize	Grand Prize	Attack on Titan	Nominated
2014	17th Attilio Micheluzzi Award	Best Foreign Series	Attack on Titan (published by Planet Manga)	Won
2014	True Believer Comic Awards	Favourite Manga	Attack on Titan	Won
2014	27th Harvey Award	Best American Edition of Foreign Material	Attack on Titan (published by Kodansha USA)	Won
2014	21st Anime & Manga Grand Prix	Best Manga	Attack on Titan	Won
2014	E-Book Awards	Grand Prize	Attack on Titan (published by Kondansha)	Won
2014	E-Book Awards	Comic Category	Attack on Titan (published by Kondansha)	Won; 1st place
2014	Pochi Awards	Best Manga International	Attack on Titan (published by Carlsen Manga)	Won
2014	20th Saló del Manga de Barcelona	Best Shōnen Manga	Attack on Titan	Won
2014	NEO Awards	Best Manga	Attack on Titan (published by Kodansha USA)	Won
2015	1st Sugoi Japan Awards	Best Manga Series	Attack on Titan	Won
2015	11th AnimaniA Awards	Best Manga International	Attack on Titan (published by Carlsen Manga)	Won
2015	Goodreads Choice Awards	Best Graphic Novels & Comics	Attack on Titan	3rd place
2021	27th Saló del Manga de Barcelona	Best Shōnen Manga	Attack on Titan (published by Norma Editorial)	Nominated
2021	Noma Publishing Award	Noma Publishing Culture Award	Hajime Isayama	Won
2023	50th Angoulême International Comics Festival	Fauve Special	Hajime Isayama	Won
