= Bungo-Nakagawa Station =

Railway station in Hita, Ōita Prefecture, Japan

Bungo-Nakagawa Station 豊後中川駅
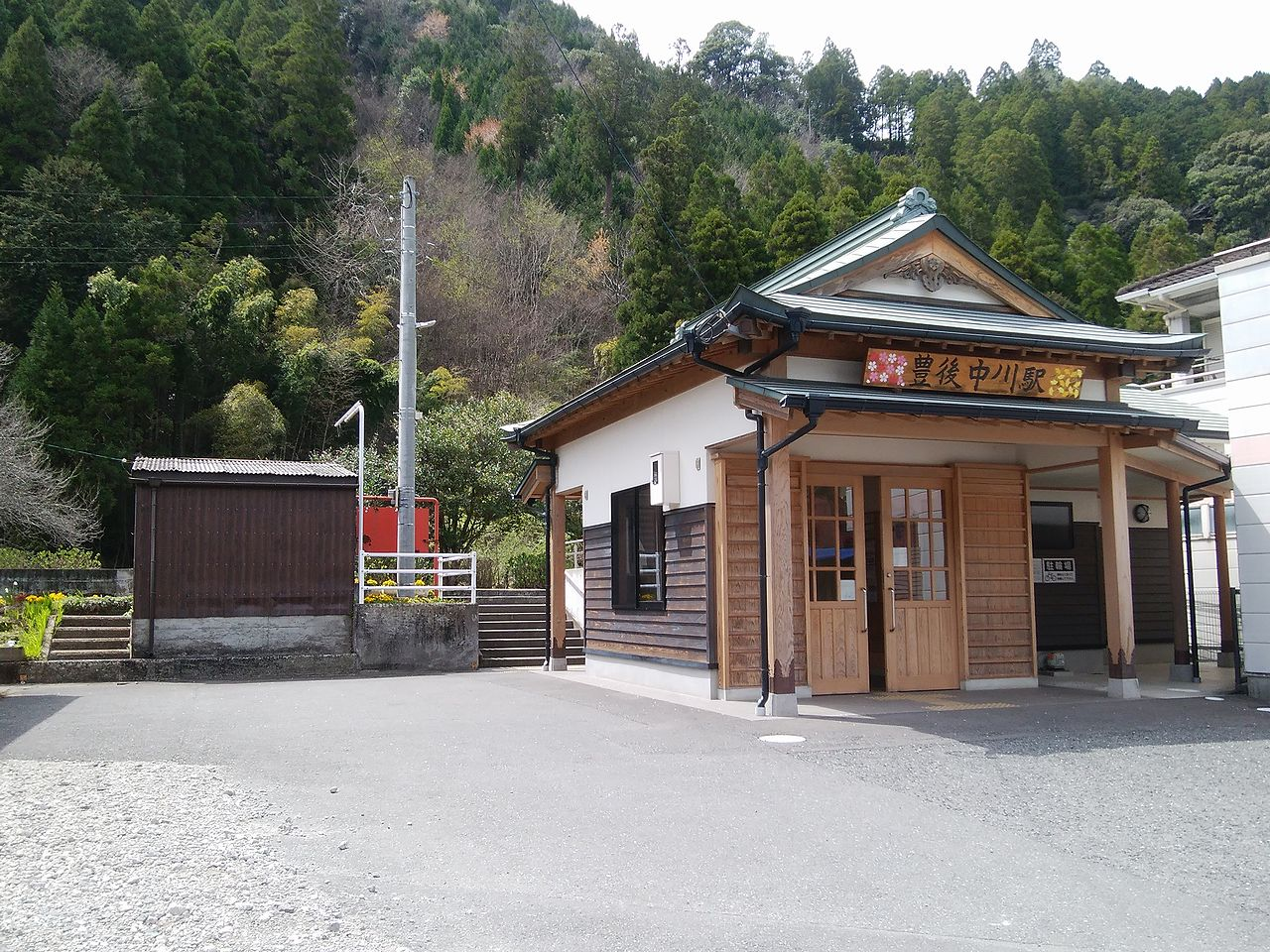
- Bungo-Nakagawa Station in April 2022

General information
- Location: Amagasemachi Gota, Hita-shi, Ōita-ken 879-4122; Japan
- Coordinates: 33°17′4.44″N 131°0′21.2″E
- Operator: JR Kyushu
- Line: ■ Kyūdai Main Line
- Distance: 55.3 km from Kurume
- Platforms: 1 side platform
- Tracks: 1

Construction
- Structure type: At grade
- Accessible: No - steps to platform

Other information
- Status: Unstaffed
- Website: Official website

History
- Opened: 15 November 1934

Passengers
- FY2015: 28 daily

Services
Preceding station	JR Kyushu	Following station
Bungo-Miyoshi towards Kurume	Kyūdai Main Line	Amagase towards Ōita
Location
- Location within Oita Prefecture Location within Japan

Bungo-Nakagawa Station (豊後中川駅, Bungo-Nakagawa-eki) is a railway station on the Kyūdai Main Line operated by JR Kyushu in Hita, Ōita Prefecture, Japan.

== Lines ==
The station is served by the Kyūdai Main Line and is located 55.3 km from the starting point of the line at Kurume.

== Layout ==
The station consists of a side platform serving a single track at grade. The station building is a modern structure but built in timber in traditional Japanese style. It is unstaffed and serves only as a waiting room. A short flight of steps lead up to the platform which has a weather shelter.

== History ==
The private Daito Railway (大湯鉄道) had opened a track between Ōita and Onoya in 1915. The Daito Railway was nationalized in 1922, after which Japanese Government Railways (JGR) undertook phased westward expansion of the track which, at the time, it had designated as the Daito Line. By 29 September 1933, the track had reached as far west as Amagase. Separately, JGR had opened the Kyudai Main Line on 24 December 1928 with a track between Kurume and Chikugo-Yoshii and had extended the line east to Hita by 3 March 1934. On 15 November 1934, a link up was achieved between Hita and Amagase, and the entire stretch from Kurume to Ōita was now designated as the Kyudai Main Line. Bungo-Nakagawa opened on the same day as an intermediate station between Hita and Amagase. With the privatization of Japanese National Railways (JNR), the successor of JGR, on 1 April 1987, JR Kyushu took over control of the station.

== Passenger statistics ==
In fiscal 2015, there were a total of 10,046 boarding passengers, giving a daily average of 28 passengers.

== Surrounding area ==
- Hita City Hall Mabara Branch Office
- Hita City Tokei Junior High School
- Hita City Tokei Elementary School -

== See also ==
- List of railway stations in Japan
