= Amagase, Ōita =

Dissolved municipality in Ōita prefecture, Japan

Amagase (天瀬町, Amagase-machi) was a town located in Hita District, Ōita Prefecture, Japan.

As of 2003, the town had an estimated population of 6,295 and the density of 61.82 persons per km^{2}. The total area was 101.83 km^{2}.

On March 22, 2005, Amagase, along with the town of Ōyama, and the villages of Kamitsue, Maetsue and Nakatsue (all from Hita District), was merged into the expanded city of Hita.
