= Hirose Tansō =

Neo-Confucian scholar, teacher and writer

Hirose Tansō 広瀬 淡窓
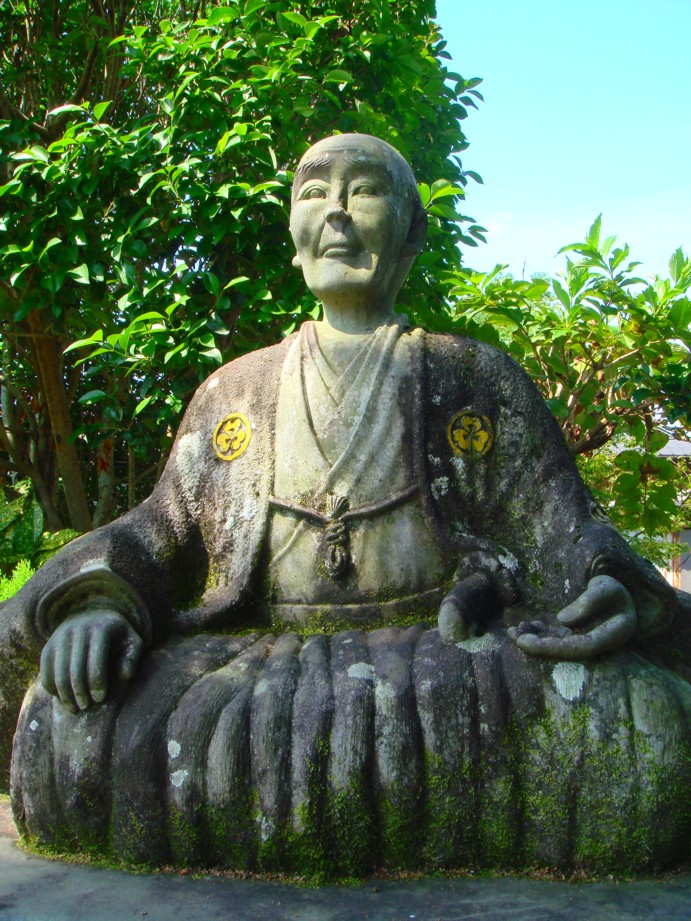
- Statue of Hirose Tansō in Hita city, Ōita
- Born: May 22, 1782; Mameda-cho, Hita-gun, Bungo Province, Japan
- Died: November 28, 1856 (aged 74); Hita, Bungo Province, Japan

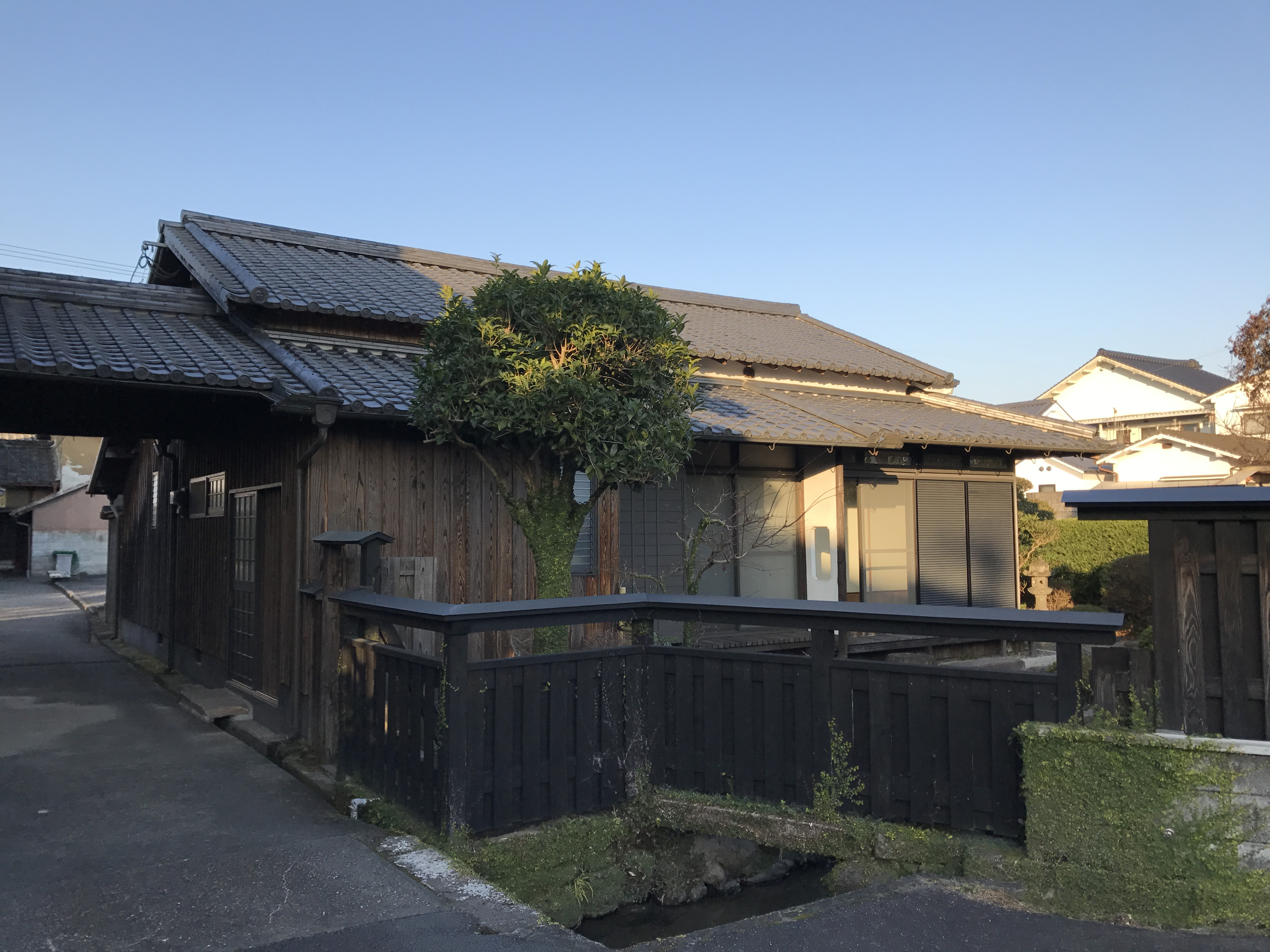
South Residence of Hirose Tanso near Mamedamachi

Hirose Tanso (広瀬 淡窓; 22 May 1782 – 28 November 1856) was a neo-Confucian scholar, teacher and writer in late Edo Period Japan.

== Biography ==
Hirose was born as the eldest son of Hakataya Saburoemon a wealthy merchant in Uomachi, Mameda-cho, Hita-gun, Bungo Province. His given name was "Toranosuke". A child prodigy, he learned to read and started to practice Japanese calligraphy from age six and to study the Chinese classics from age nine. At the age of ten, he became a student of Chikuin Matsushita a ronin from Kurume who frequented the Hita magistrate's office. He studied Chinese poetry and lectured the magistrate of Hita of filial piety at age 13. He lost his mentor because he entered the service of the Mori clan of Saiki Domain. When he was 16 years old, he went to Kamei Juku in Chikuzen Province and studied under father and son Kamei Nanmei and Shoyo, but he suffered from a serious illness and left the school at age 19 to return home. His illness lasted for a long time, and at one point his life was in danger, but he was saved by Minato Kurashige, a doctor from Higo Province. Afterwards, due to his tendency to get sick, he gave up on taking over the family business and left the store to his younger brother Kyubei, and once aspired to become a doctor, but Minato Kurashige's words suggested that he pursue a career as a scholar and educator. Hirose founded in 1801 the Academy Neo-Confucian Kangien (咸宜園). It continued after his death and was operated by his younger brothers Hirose Kyosho, Hayashigai, and Hirose Seison until 1897, eventually growing to become of the largest private Confucian academies in Japan, with over 4000 students in 1871.

Its graduates included Confucian and Buddhist monks, doctors of traditional Chinese medicine and medicine of Western Europe, politicians and administrators, traders, farmers and samurai.

Hirose published an anthology of his poems in 1837, a three-volume edition of his writings was published as TANSO Zenshu (淡窓全集) between 1925 and 1927.

=== Hirose Tansō grave and residence ===
Hirose died in 1856 at the age of 75. Before his death, he chose his grave site and wrote the epitaph for his tombstone. The site was the location of a villa named "Chōseien" belonging to Hirose Sanemon (Tansō's younger brother), and "Chōseien" is the name of that villa. Later, the graves of Hirose Seison and Hirose Hayashigai were placed next to Tansō's grave . The grave was designated as a National Historic Site in 1948 as the grave of a person who left a significant mark on the history of early modern Japanese education. It is located approximately a 25-minute walk from Hita Station on the JR Kyushu Kyūdai Main Line.

The Hirose Museum (廣瀬資料館, Hirose Shiryokan) is located in Uomachi in Hita. Most of the buildings in the former residence were built during the era of the 6th head of the family, Hirose Kyubei, who was Tansō's younger brother, and the building where Tansō gave his first lecture when he was 23 years old no longer exists. However, in 2012 the former residence was added to the national historic site designation.

=== Kangi-en ===
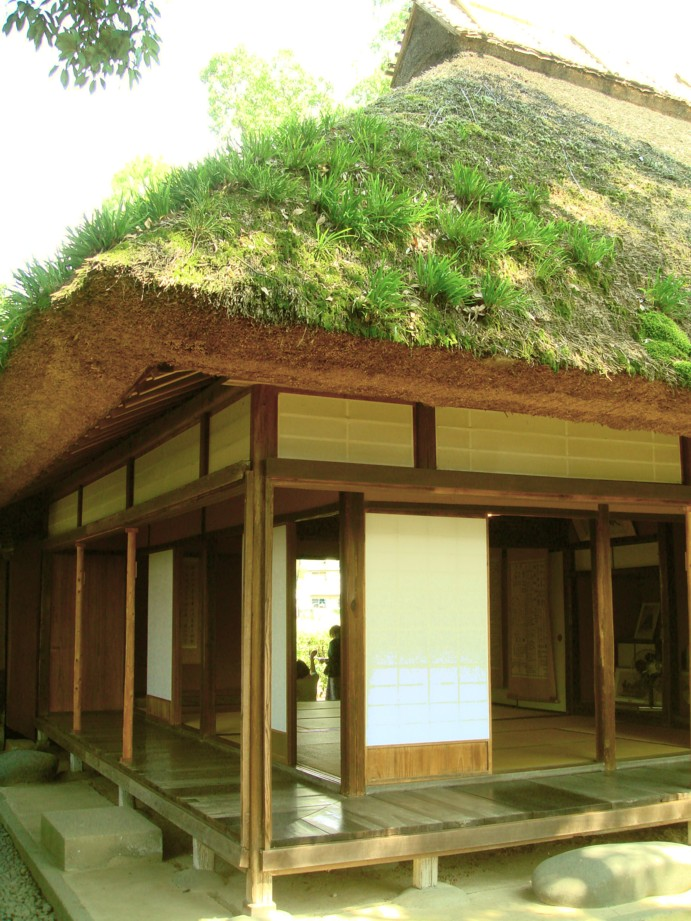
Shufuan

The Kangi-en, the school first founded by Hirose Tansō on the grounds of the Buddhist temple of Chōfuku-ji (where Tansō first studied poetry), was located almost in the center of Hita. The name "Kangi" comes from the Chinese Classic of Poetry, and translates to "everything is good". It was opened in 1805; two years later, it was moved to the banks of the Nakagusuku River, and in 1817, it was relocated to its current location and was renamed "Kangi-en". It continued to exist as a private academy until 1897 under the leadership of nine masters. Students come from all over the country, and at its peak there were 200 students enrolled, making it one of the largest private schools in Japan with a total of over 4,000 graduates, including Ōmura Masujirō, Kiyoura Keigo and Ueno Hikoma. The school was open to all, regardless of their social status, as long as they paid the entrance fee and filled out the necessary information on the register and it was the policy of the academy that all students to learn equally, regardless of their social status, origin, age, or other background. Records indicate that there was at least one female student. Lectures were held on various subjects, including mathematics, astronomy, and medicine, as well as the Four Books and Five Classics, which was the core of the Chinese classics and basis for much of Japanese Confucianism. There were exams every month, and students were ranked from grade 1 to grade 9 depending on their performance. Since many of the students came from far away, a dormitory was also built.

The Kangi-en was designated as a National Historic Site in 1932. However, the original buildings were mostly destroyed by a fire in 1943. Of the original structures, the Shufuan and Enshiro survive. The Shufuan was built in its current location in 1781 by Tansō's uncle, who was a haiku poet, and the structure was one of the classrooms of the academy. The Enshiro was originally built as a general merchant's house in 1817, and was moved to its current location in 1849. There was a library on the first floor and a study on the second floor. The Tojuku was rebuilt in 1890 to house a library was removed in 1915 to make way for new buildings (which also no longer exist. Nishijuku, which was located on the west side across the road, was used as the Hita District Office from 1889, but it was later removed, leaving behind a well, and no longer exists.
