= Keisuke Kimoto =

Japanese footballer (born 1984)

Personal information
- Full name: Keisuke Kimoto
- Date of birth: August 23, 1984 (age 42)
- Place of birth: Hito, Ōita, Japan
- Height: 1.68 m (5 ft 6 in)
- Position: Midfielder

Youth career
- 2003–2006: Kansai University Football Club

Senior career*
Years	Team	Apps	(Gls)
2007–2017	ALO's Hokuriku; Kataller Toyama	259	(21)
- * Club domestic league appearances and goals as of 2 February 2018

Keisuke Kimoto (木本 敬介, Kimoto Keisuke; born August 23, 1984 in Hita, Ōita) is a former Japanese football player, who played for all of his career with Kataller Toyama.

== Club career statistics ==
Updated to 2 February 2018.

Club performance			League		Cup		League Cup		Total	
Season	Club	League	Apps	Goals	Apps	Goals	Apps	Goals	Apps	Goals
Japan			League		Emperor's Cup		J. League Cup		Total	
2007	ALO's Hokuriku	JFL	31	6	2	0	-		33	6
2008	Kataller Toyama	JFL	15	0	2	0	-		17	0
2009	Kataller Toyama	J2 League	38	5	2	0	-		40	5
2010	Kataller Toyama	J2 League	22	2	1	0	–		23	2
2011	Kataller Toyama	J2 League	29	0	2	0	–		31	0
2012	Kataller Toyama	J2 League	16	0	1	0	–		17	0
2013	Kataller Toyama	J2 League	33	2	1	0	–		34	2
2014	Kataller Toyama	J2 League	34	2	1	0	–		35	2
2015	Kataller Toyama	J3 League	21	2	–		–		21	2
2016	Kataller Toyama	J3 League	14	1	1	0	–		15	1
2017	Kataller Toyama	J3 League	6	1	1	0	–		7	1
Total			259	21	14	0	–		273	21
