= Hita District, Ōita =

Former district in Ōita prefecture, Japan

Hita (日田郡, Hita-gun) was a district located in Ōita Prefecture, Japan.

As of 2003, the district had an estimated population of 14,180 and the density of 35.72 persons per km^{2}. The total area was 396.98 km^{2}.

Prior to its dissolution, on March 21, 2005, there were three towns and two villages within the district:

- Amagase
- Ōyama
- Kamitsue
- Maetsue
- Nakatsue

== Merger ==
- On March 22, 2005 — the towns of Amagase and Ōyama, and the villages of Kamitsue, Maetsue and Nakatsue were merged into the expanded city of Hita, and Hita District was dissolved as a result of this merger.
