= Amagase Station =

Railway station in Hita, Ōita Prefecture, Japan

Amagase Station 天ヶ瀬駅
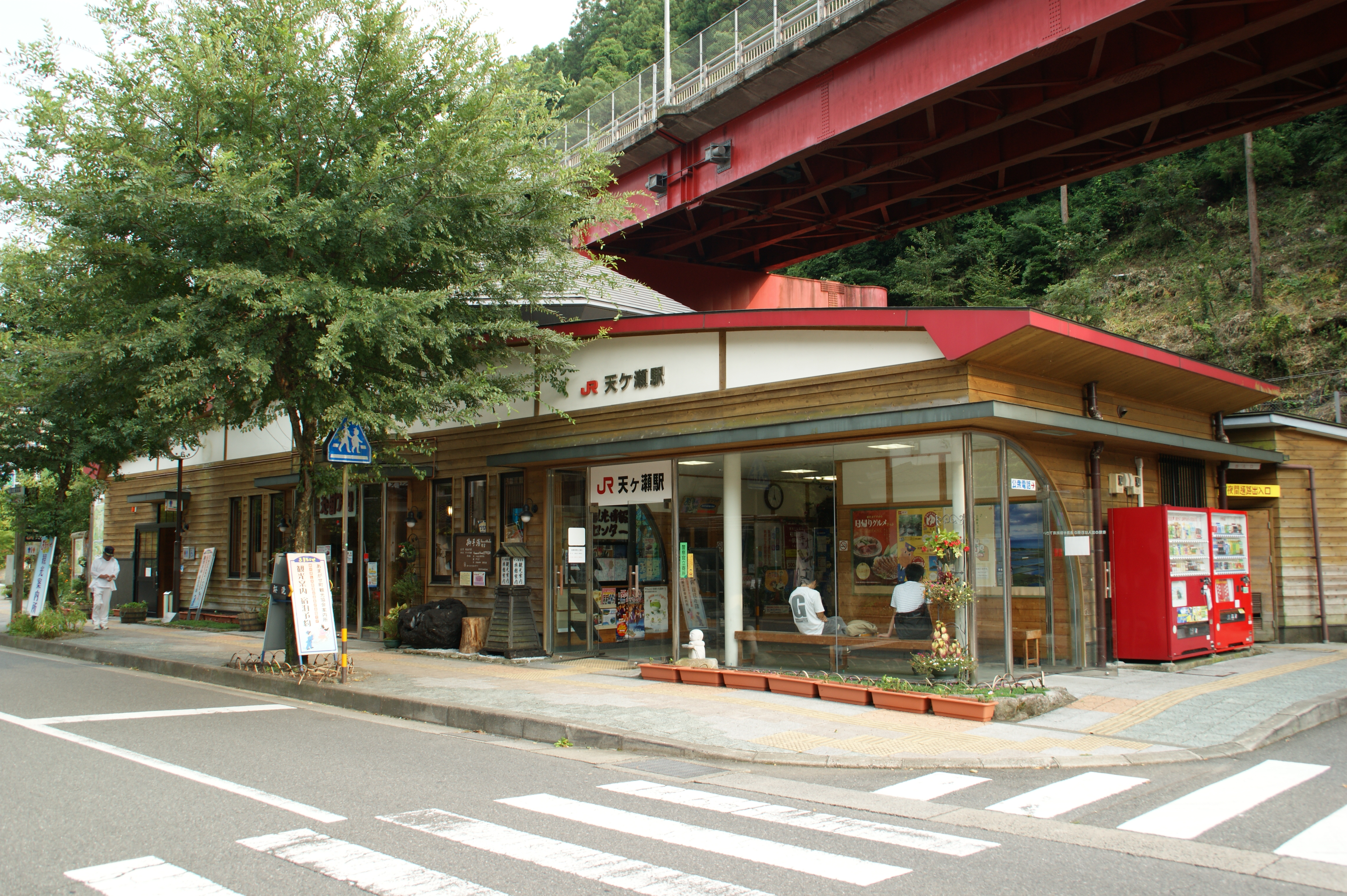
- Amagase Station in 2008.

General information
- Location: 540-1 Shochiku, Amagasemachi Hita-shi, Ōita-ken 879-4201; Japan
- Coordinates: 33°15′18″N 131°01′29″E
- Operator: JR Kyushu
- Line: ■ Kyūdai Main Line
- Distance: 59.5 km from Kurume
- Platforms: 1 island platform
- Tracks: 2

Construction
- Structure type: At grade
- Accessible: No - steps to platform

Other information
- Status: Staff ticket window (outsourced)
- Website: Official website

History
- Opened: 29 September 1933

Passengers
- FY2016: 130 daily

Services
Preceding station	JR Kyushu	Following station
Bungo-Nakagawa towards Kurume	Kyūdai Main Line	Sugikawachi towards Ōita
Location
- Location within Oita Prefecture Location within Japan

Amagase Station (天ヶ瀬駅, Amagase-eki) is a passenger railway station located in the city of Hita, Ōita Prefecture, Japan. It is operated by JR Kyushu.

== Lines ==
The station is served by the Kyūdai Main Line and is located 59.5 km from the starting point of the line at Kurume.

== Layout ==
The station consists of an island platform with two tracks at grade. The station building is a modern structure which houses a waiting area, a staffed ticket window as well as the local tourism information centre. The platform is at a higher level than the station building and is accessed by a flight of steps.

Management of the station has been outsourced to the JR Kyushu Tetsudou Eigyou Co., a wholly owned subsidiary of JR Kyushu specialising in station services. It staffs the ticket counter which is equipped with a POS machine but does not have a Midori no Madoguchi facility.

=== Platforms ===
1	■ ■ Kyūdai Main Line	for Ōita
2	■ ■ Kyūdai Main Line	for Hita and Kurume

== History ==
The private Daito Railway (大湯鉄道) had opened a track between Ōita and Onoya in 1915. The Daito Railway was nationalized on 1 December 1922, after which Japanese Government Railways (JGR) undertook phased westward expansion of the track which, at the time, it had designated as the Daito Line. By 1932, the track had reached Kita-Yamada. Subsequently, the track was extended further west and Amagase opened as the new western terminus on 29 September 1933. On 15 November 1934, the track from Amagase linked up with the track of the Kyudai Main Line from Hita, establishing through-traffic from Kurume to Ōita. The track of the Daito Line was then re-designated as part of the Kyudai Main Line. With the privatization of Japanese National Railways (JNR), the successor of JGR, on 1 April 1987, the station came under the control of JR Kyushu.

== Passenger statistics ==
In fiscal 2015, there were a total of 28,329 boarding passengers, giving a daily average of 78 passengers.

== Surrounding area ==
- Amagase Onsen

== See also ==
- List of railway stations in Japan
