= Kita-Yamada Station =

Railway station in Kusu, Ōita Prefecture, Japan

Kita-Yamada Station 北山田駅
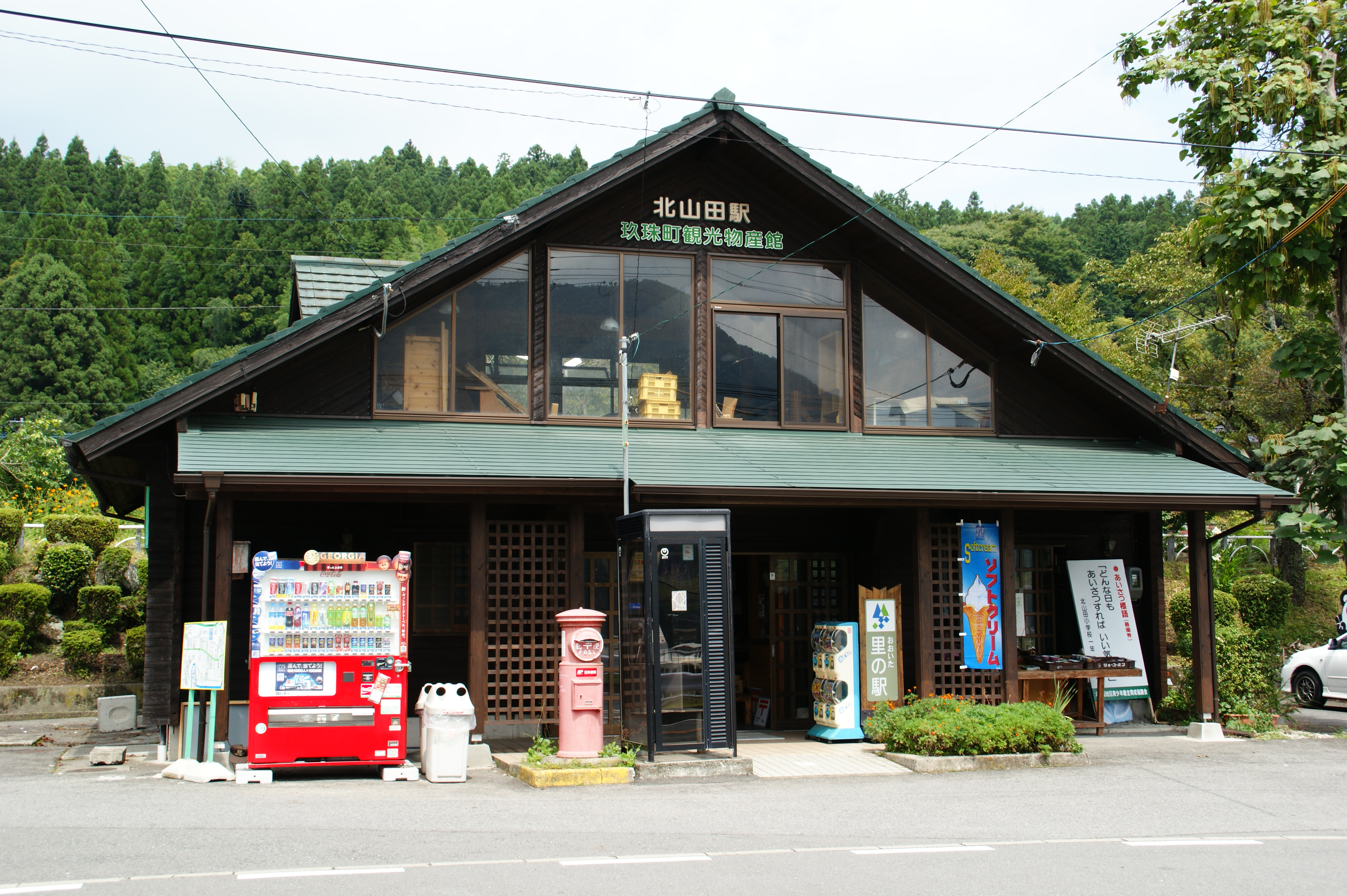
- Kita-Yamada Station in 2008.

General information
- Location: Tobata, Kusu-cho, Kusu-gun, Ōita-ken 879-4331; Japan
- Coordinates: 33°16′55.27″N 131°6′3.64″E
- Operator: JR Kyushu
- Line: ■ Kyūdai Main Line
- Distance: 67.8 km from Kurume
- Platforms: 1 side platform
- Tracks: 1

Construction
- Structure type: Side hill cutting
- Cycle facilities: Bike shed
- Accessible: No - steps to platform

Other information
- Status: Unstaffed
- Website: Official website

History
- Opened: 16 September 1932

Passengers
- FY2015: 41 daily

Services
Preceding station	JR Kyushu	Following station
Sugikawachi towards Kurume	Kyūdai Main Line	Bungo-Mori towards Ōita
Location
- Location within Oita Prefecture Location within Japan

Kita-Yamada Station (北山田駅, Kita-Yamada-eki) is a passenger railway station located in the town of Kusu, Ōita Prefecture, Japan. It is operated by JR Kyushu.

== Lines ==
The station is served by the Kyūdai Main Line and is located 67.8 km from the starting point of the line at Kurume.

== Layout ==
The station, which is unstaffed, consists of a side platform serving a single track on a side hill cutting overlooking the main road and a river valley with a waterfall visible from the station. The station building is a modern timber structure built to resemble a mountain cabin. The waiting area for passengers is located on the ground floor while the upper floor is used by a local tourism association which maintains an exhibition in the station premises. From the station building, a short flight of steps leads up to the platform. A bike shed is provided outside the station building.

== History ==
The private Daito Railway (大湯鉄道) had opened a track between Ōita and Onoya in 1915. The Daito Railway was nationalized on 1 December 1922, after which Japanese Government Railways (JGR) undertook phased westward expansion of the track which, at the time, it had designated as the Daito Line. By 1929, the track had reached Bungo-Mori. Subsequently, the track was extended further west and Kita-Yamada was opened as the new western terminus on 16 September 1932. On 29 September 1933, Kita-Yamada became a through-station when the track was again extended to Amagase. On 15 November 1934, when the Daito Line had linked up with the Kyudai Main Line further west, JGR designated the station as part of the Kyudai Main Line. With the privatization of Japanese National Railways (JNR), the successor of JGR, on 1 April 1987, the station came under the control of JR Kyushu.

== Passenger statistics ==
In fiscal 2015, there were a total of 14,884 boarding passengers, giving a daily average of 41 passengers.

== Surrounding area ==
- Mikazuki Falls
- Kusu Town Kitayamada Elementary School
- Kusu Town Kitayamada Junior High School

== See also ==
- List of railway stations in Japan
