= Matsubara Dam =

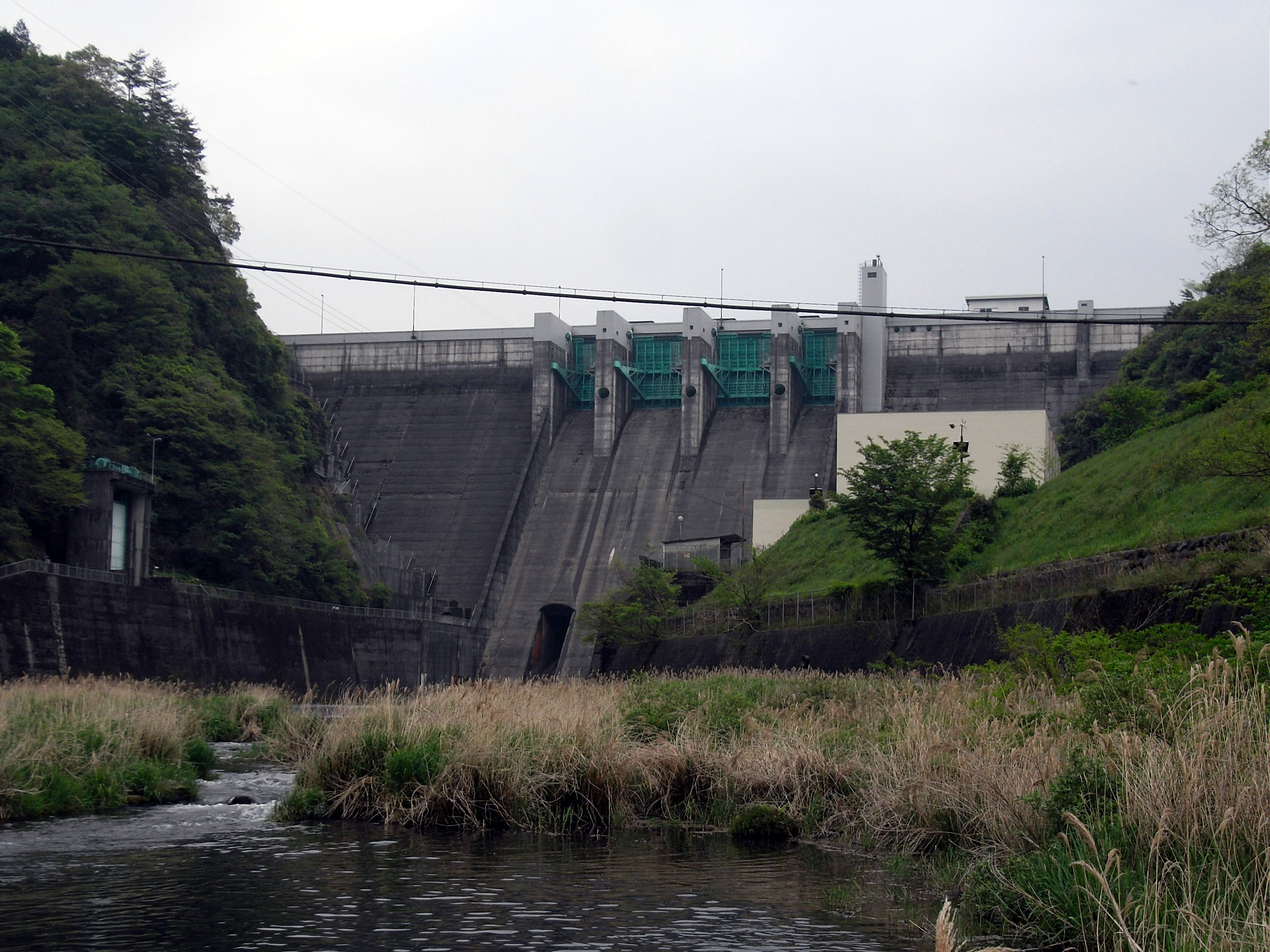
- Interactive map of Matsubara Dam
- Official name: 松原ダム
- Location: Ōita Prefecture, Japan
- Coordinates: 33°11′39″N 130°59′38″E
- Purpose: Flood control, power generation
- Construction began: 1958
- Opening date: 1972; 54 years ago
- Operators: Kyushu Regional Development Bureau, Ministry of Land, Infrastructure, Transport and Tourism

Dam and spillways
- Type of dam: Gravity dam
- Impounds: Chikugo River
- Length: 192.0 m (629.9 ft)
- Elevation at crest: 82.4 m (270 ft)
- Dam volume: 294,000 m^{3} (10,400,000 ft^{3})

Reservoir
- Creates: Umebayashi Lake
- Catchment area: 491.0 km^{2} (189.6 sq mi)

Matsubara Power Plant
- Operator: Kyushu Electric Power
- Installed capacity: 50.6 MW

Matsubara Dam (Japanese: 松原ダム) is a dam in the Ōita Prefecture, Japan, completed in 1972.
