= Era Station =

Railway station in Kokonoe, Ōita Prefecture, Japan

Era Station 恵良駅
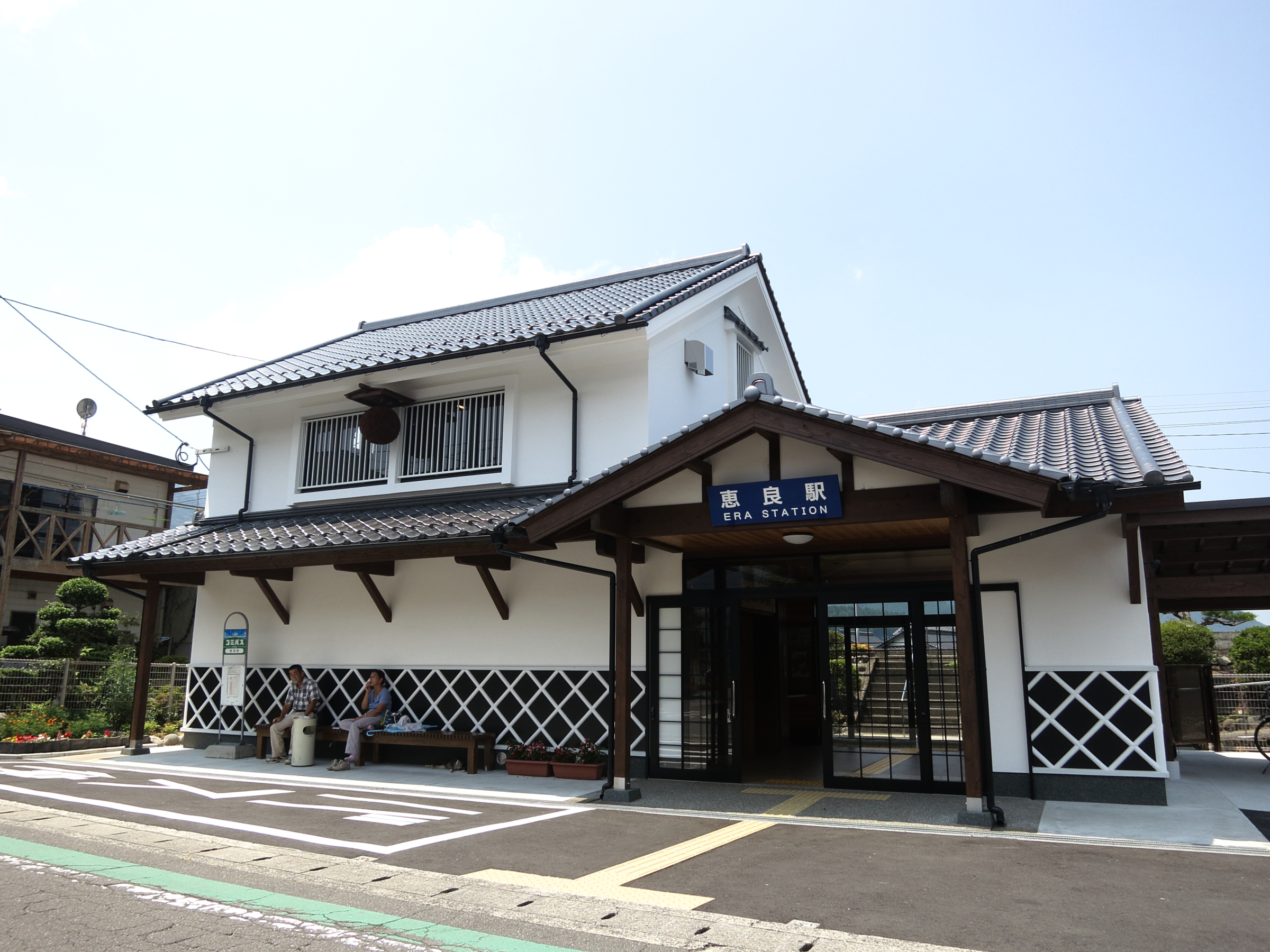
- Era Station in 2015

General information
- Location: Migita, Kokonoe-cho, Kusu-gun, Ōita-ken 879-4601; Japan
- Coordinates: 33°15′19″N 131°10′28″E
- Operator: JR Kyushu
- Line: ■ Kyūdai Main Line
- Distance: 77.3 km from Kurume
- Platforms: 2 side platforms
- Tracks: 2 + 1 siding

Construction
- Structure type: At grade

Other information
- Status: Unstaffed
- Website: Official website

History
- Opened: 15 December 1929
- Rebuilt: 2015

Passengers
- FY2015: 41 daily

Services
| Preceding station | JR Kyushu | Following station |
|---|---|---|
| Bungo-Mori towards Kurume | Kyūdai Main Line | Hikiji towards Ōita |
Location
- Location within Oita Prefecture Location within Japan

Era Station (恵良駅, Era-eki) is a passenger railway station located in the town of Kokonoe, Ōita Prefecture, Japan. It is operated by JR Kyushu.

== Lines ==
The station is served by the Kyūdai Main Line and is located 77.3 km from the starting point of the line at Kurume.

== Layout ==
The station consists of two side platforms serving two tracks at grade with a siding. The station building, built in 2015, is a plaster wall traditional Japanese design made to resemble a sake brewery. It houses a waiting area as well as a museum on the history of the town. From the station building, a short flight of steps leads up to platform 1. Access to the opposite side platform is by means of a level crossing.

=== Platforms ===
| 1 | ■ ■ Kyūdai Main Line | for Yufuin and Ōita |
| 2 | ■ ■ Kyūdai Main Line | for Hita and Kurume |

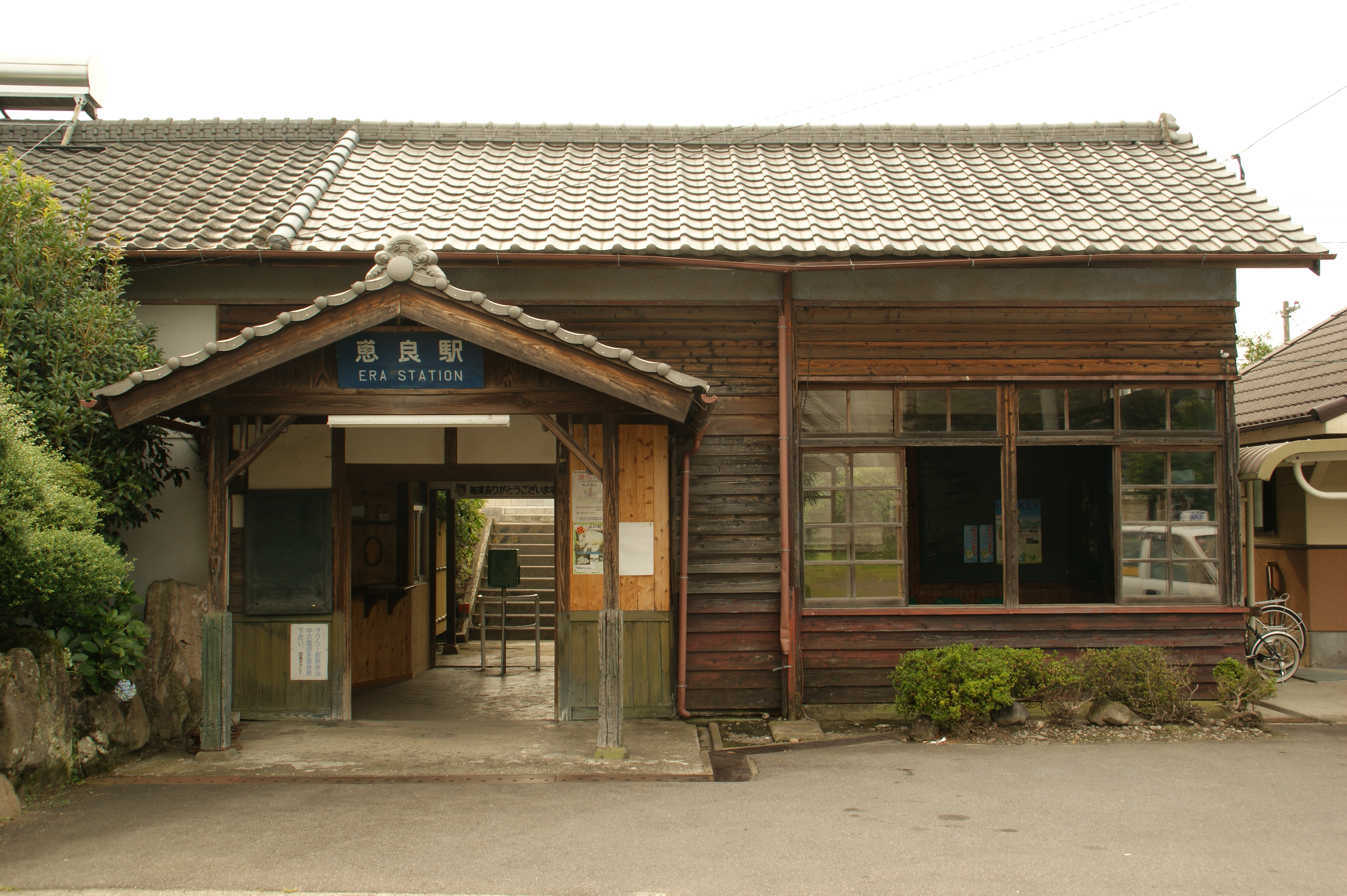
The old station building which burned down in 2014.

== History ==
The private Daito Railway (大湯鉄道) had opened a track between Ōita and Onoya in 1915. The Daito Railway was nationalized on 1 December 1922, after which Japanese Government Railways (JGR) undertook phased westward expansion of the track which, at the time, it had designated as the Daito Line. By 1928, the track had reached Bungo-Nakamura. Subsequently, the track was extended further west and Bungo-Mori was opened as the new western terminus on 15 December 1929. On the same day, Era was opened as an intermediate station along the new track. On 15 November 1934, when the Daito Line had linked up with the Kyudai Main Line further west, JGR designated the station as part of the Kyudai Main Line. With the privatization of Japanese National Railways (JNR), the successor of JGR, on 1 April 1987, the station came under the control of JR Kyushu.

In the early hours of 18 January 2014, the original station building built in 1929 and an adjoining residence burned down in a fire. Subsequently, the Kokonoe town authorities rebuilt the station building, opening it in March 2015. The new building also housed a museum featuring exhibits about the local sake brewing industry. In keeping with this theme, the station building was designed to resemble the nearby Yatsushika Brewery, complete with a ball of cedar needles indicating that a fresh batch of sake has been brewed. The building is in dozo dzukuri style with white plaster namako walls similar to the station at Chikugo-Yoshii.

== Passenger statistics ==
In fiscal 2015, there were a total of 14,803 boarding passengers, giving a daily average of 41 passengers.

== Surrounding area ==
- Yatsushika sake brewery - the station building was designed to resemble this nearby brewery
- Higashi-Iida Junior High School
- Higashi-Iida Elementary School

== See also ==
- List of railway stations in Japan
