= Minami-Kurume Station =

Railway station in Kurume, Fukuoka Prefecture, Japan

Minami-Kurume Station 南久留米駅
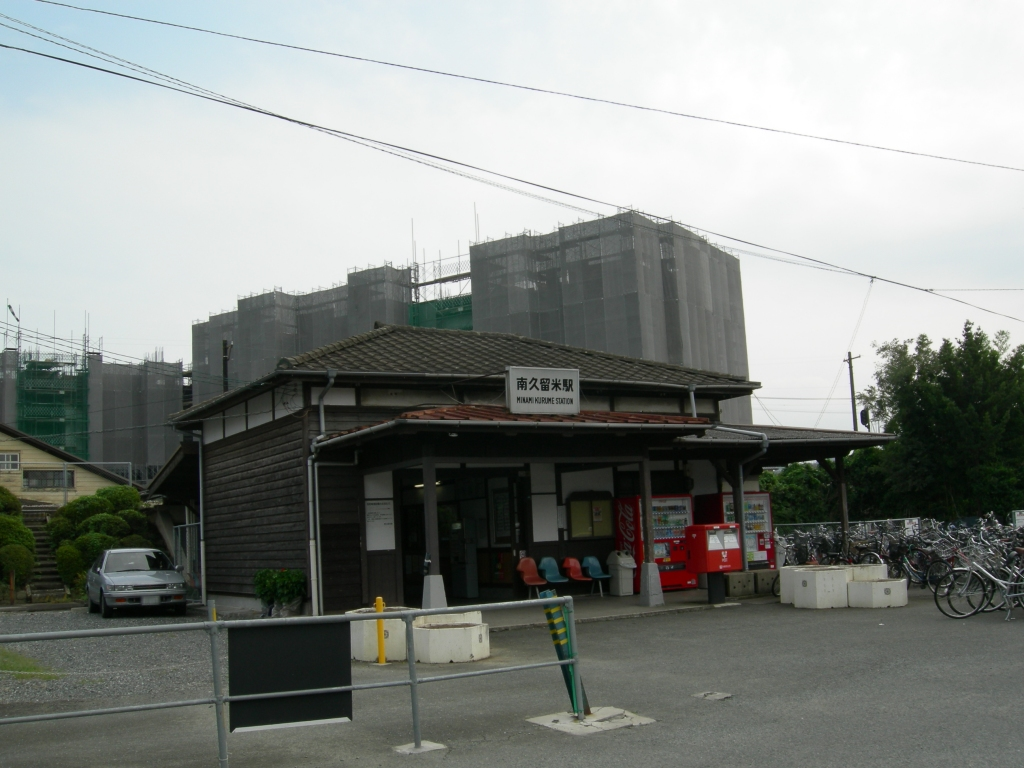
- Minami-Kurume Station in 2006

General information
- Location: Nonakamachi, Kurume-shi, Fukuoka-ken 839-0862; Japan
- Coordinates: 33°18′09″N 130°31′53″E
- Operator: JR Kyushu
- Line: Kyūdai Main Line
- Distance: 4.9 km (3.0 mi) from Kurume
- Platforms: 1 island platform
- Tracks: 2 + 1 siding

Construction
- Structure type: Embankment
- Accessible: No - underpass to platform has steps

Other information
- Status: Staffed ticket window (outsourced)
- Website: Official website

History
- Opened: 24 December 1928

Passengers
- FY2020: 329 daily
- Rank: 264th (among JR Kyushu stations)

Services
Preceding station	JR Kyushu	Following station
Kurume-Kōkōmae towards Kurume	Kyūdai Main Line	Kurume-Daigakumae towards Ōita
Location
- Location within Fukuoka Prefecture Location within Japan

Minami-Kurume Station (南久留米駅, Minami-Kurume-eki) is a passenger railway station located in the city of Kurume, Fukuoka Prefecture, Japan. It is operated by JR Kyushu.

== Lines ==
The station is served by the Kyudai Main Line and is located 4.9 km from the starting point of the line at Kurume. Only local trains on the line stop at the station.

== Layout ==
The station consists of an island platform serving two tracks on a low embankment. The station building is an old wooden building in traditional Japanese style with a staffed ticket window. An underpass leads under the embankment and up to the island platform.

Management of the station has been outsourced to the JR Kyushu Tetsudou Eigyou Co., a wholly owned subsidiary of JR Kyushu specialising in station services. It staffs the ticket counter which is equipped with a POS machine but does not have a Midori no Madoguchi facility.

=== Platforms ===
1	■ ■Kyūdai Main Line	for Hita
2	■ ■ Kyūdai Main Line	for Kurume

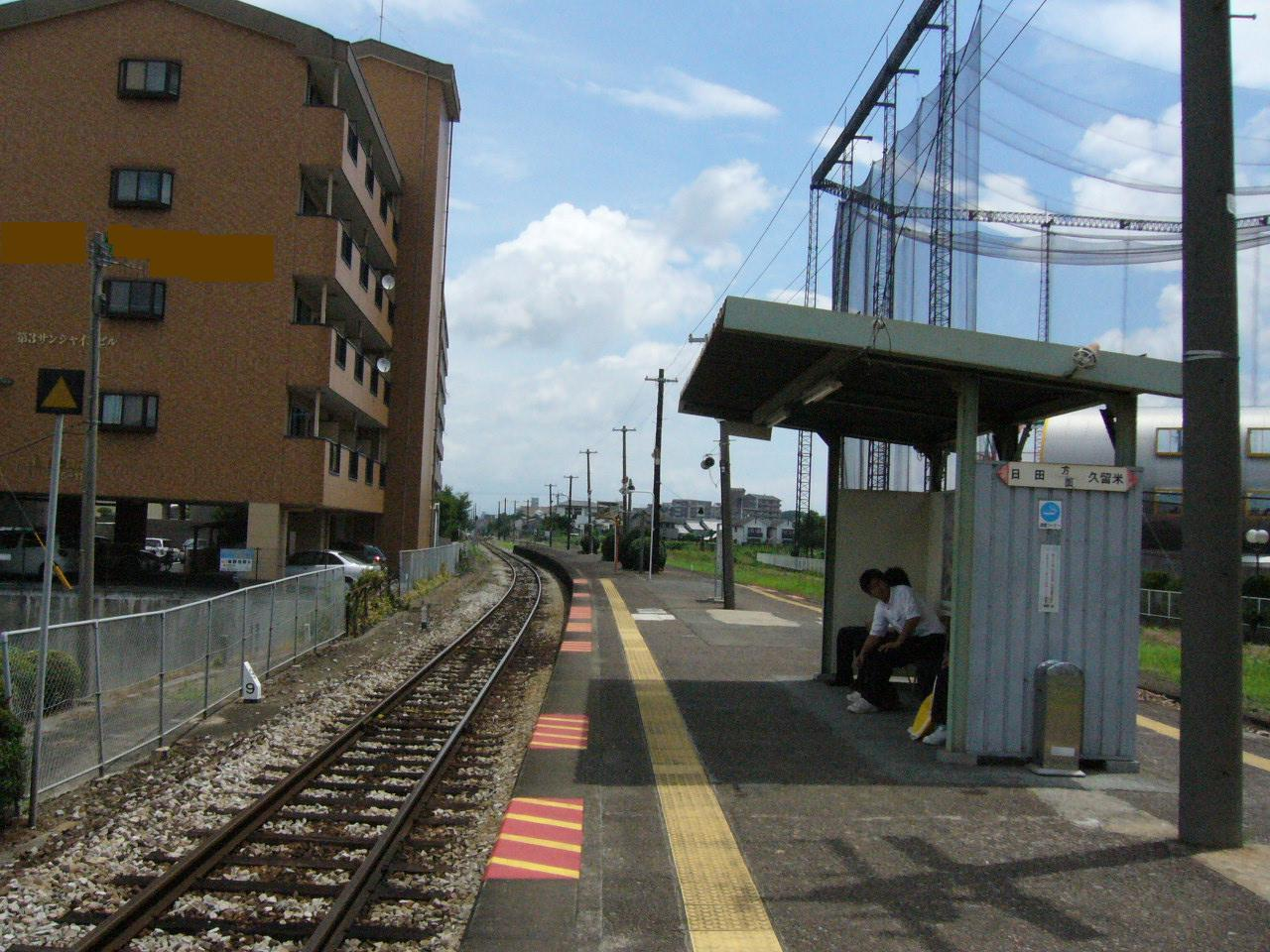
A view of the platform and tracks

== History ==
Japanese Government Railways (JGR) opened a track from Kurume to Chikugo-Yoshii on 24 December 1928 during the first phase of the construction of the Kyudai Main Line. Minami-Kurume was opened on the same day as one of several intermediate stations on the track. With the privatization of Japanese National Railways (JNR), the successor of JGR, on 1 April 1987, JR Kyushu took over control of the station.

== Passenger statistics ==
In fiscal 2020, the station was used by an average of 329 passengers daily (boarding passengers only), and it ranked 264th among the busiest stations of JR Kyushu.

== Surrounding area ==
- Kurume Velodrome
- Japan Ground Self-Defense Force Kurume Garrison
- Japan Ground Self-Defense Force Maekawara Garrison (Officer Candidate School)

== See also ==
- List of railway stations in Japan
