= Noya Station =

Railway station in Kokonoe, Ōita Prefecture, Japan

Noya Station 野矢駅
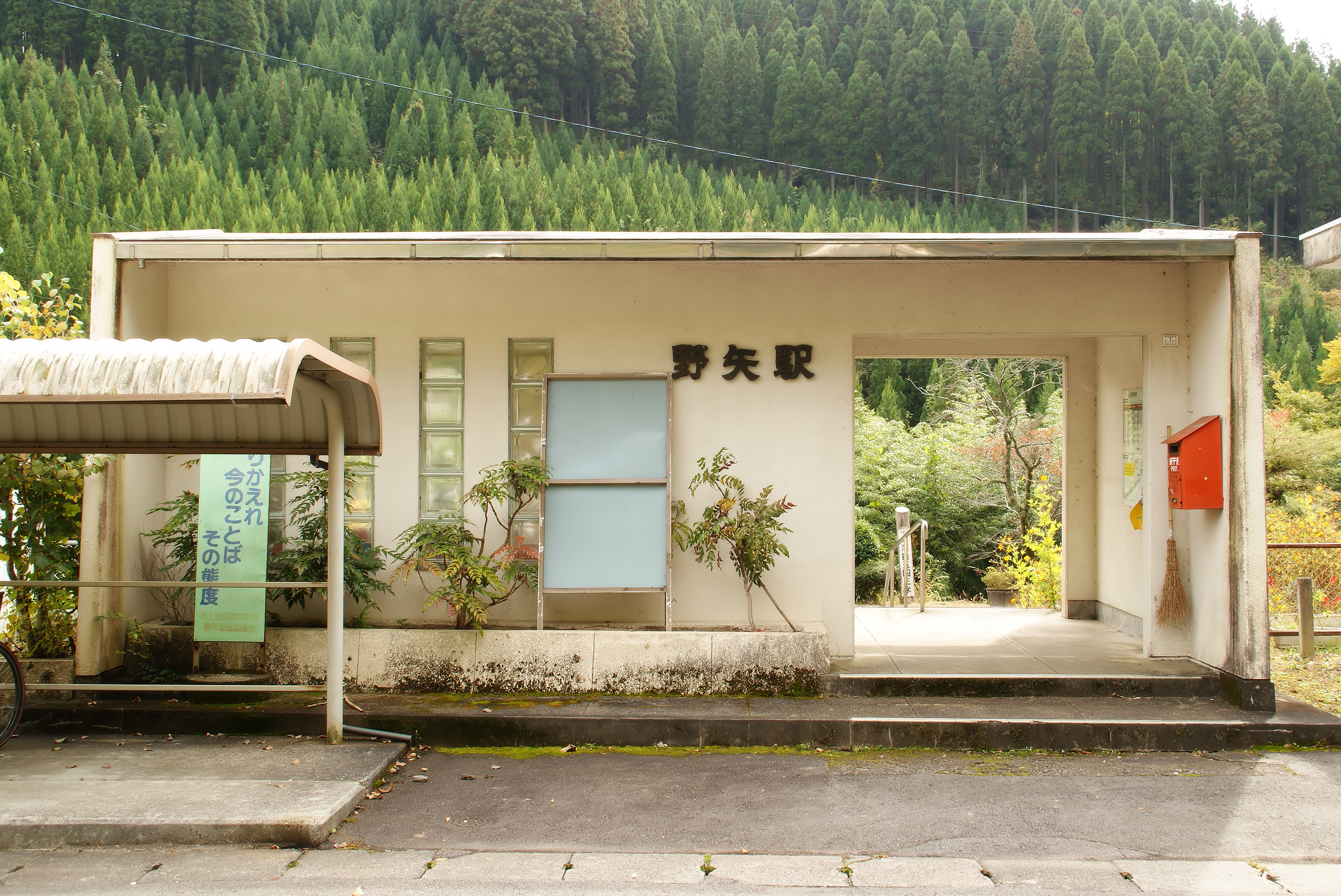
- Noya Station in 2008

General information
- Location: Nogami, Kokonoe-cho, Kusu-gun, Ōita-ken, 879-4802; Japan
- Coordinates: 33°14′26″N 131°15′07″E
- Operator: JR Kyushu
- Line: ■ Kyūdai Main Line
- Distance: 88.2 km from Kurume
- Platforms: 2 side platforms
- Tracks: 2 + 1 siding

Construction
- Structure type: At grade

Other information
- Status: Unstaffed
- Website: Official website

History
- Opened: 26 November 1926

Passengers
- FY2015: 7 daily

Services
Preceding station	JR Kyushu	Following station
Bungo-Nakamura towards Kurume	Kyūdai Main Line	Yufuin towards Ōita
Location
- Location within Oita Prefecture Location within Japan

Noya Station (野矢駅, Noya-eki) is a passenger railway station located in the town of Kokonoe, Ōita Prefecture, Japan. It is operated by JR Kyushu.

== Lines ==
The station is served by the Kyūdai Main Line and is located 88.2 km from the starting point of the line at Kurume.

== Layout ==
The station consists of two side platforms serving two tracks at grade. The station building is a small, modern, functional concrete structure which is unstaffed and serves only as a waiting room. From the station building, a short flight of steps leads down to platform 1 which is at a lower level. Access to the opposite side platform is by means of a level crossing with ramps.

=== Platforms ===
1	■ ■ Kyūdai Main Line	for Ōita
1,2	■ ■ Kyūdai Main Line	for Hita and Kurume (only 3 trains per day)

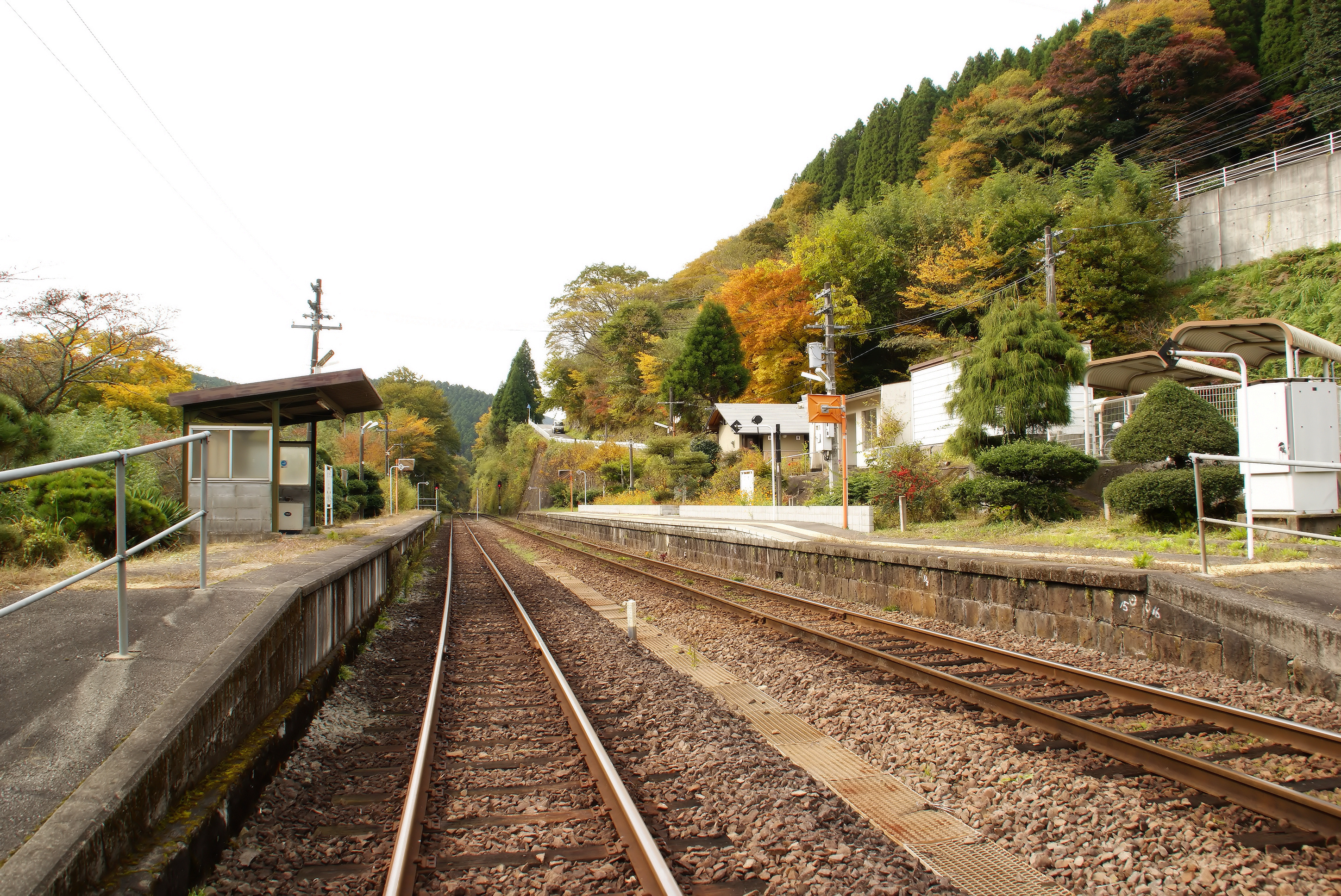
A view of the station platforms and tracks.

== History ==
The private Daito Railway (大湯鉄道) had opened a track between Ōita and Onoya in 1915. The Daito Railway was nationalized on 1 December 1922, after which Japanese Government Railways (JGR) undertook phased westward expansion of the track which, at the time, it had designated as the Daito Line. By 1925, the track had reached Yufuin. Subsequently, the track was extended further west and Noya was opened as the new western terminus on 26 November 1926. Noya became a through-station on 28 October 1928 when the track was extended to Bungo-Nakamura. On 15 November 1934, when the Daito Line had linked up with the Kyudai Main Line further west, JGR designated the station as part of the Kyudai Main Line. With the privatization of Japanese National Railways (JNR), the successor of JGR, on 1 April 1987, the station came under the control of JR Kyushu.

== Passenger statistics ==
In fiscal 2015, there were a total of 2,444 boarding passengers, giving a daily average of 7 passengers.

== Surrounding area ==
- Oita Prefectural Route 710 Tanonokami Line

== See also ==
- List of railway stations in Japan
