= Bungo-Nakamura Station =

Railway station in Kokonoe, Ōita Prefecture, Japan

Bungo-Nakamura Station 豊後中村駅
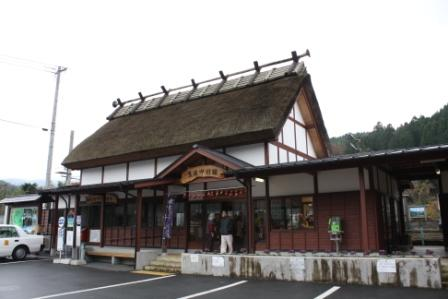
- Bungo-Nakamura Station in 2012

General information
- Location: Migita, Kokonoe-cho, Kusu-gun, Ōita-ken 879-4601; Japan
- Coordinates: 33°13′34″N 131°12′27″E
- Operator: JR Kyushu
- Line: ■ Kyūdai Main Line
- Platforms: 2 side platforms
- Tracks: 2

Construction
- Structure type: At grade
- Accessible: No - platforms linked by footbridge

Other information
- Status: Kan'i itaku station
- Website: Official website

History
- Opened: 28 October 1928

Passengers
- FY2015: 78 daily

Services
Preceding station	JR Kyushu	Following station
Hikiji towards Kurume	Kyūdai Main Line	Noya towards Ōita
Location
- Location within Oita Prefecture Location within Japan

Bungo-Nakamura Station (豊後中村駅, Bungo-Nakamura-eki) is a passenger railway station located in the town of Kokonoe, Ōita Prefecture, Japan. It is operated by JR Kyushu.

== Lines ==
The station is served by the Kyūdai Main Line and is located 83.1 km from the starting point of the line at Kurume.

== Layout ==
The station consists of two side platforms serving two tracks at grade. The station building, rebuilt in 2010, is a traditional Japanese design with a thatched roof. It houses a waiting area as well as the premises and information centre of the Kokonoe Town Tourism Association. The association also acts as a kan'i itaku agent and manages the ticket window which is equipped with a POS machine but does not have a Midori no Madoguchi facility. Access to the opposite side platform is by means of a footbridge.

=== Platforms ===
1	■ ■ Kyūdai Main Line	for Ōita
2	■ ■ Kyūdai Main Line	for Hita and Kurume

== History ==
The private Daito Railway (大湯鉄道) had opened a track between Ōita and Onoya in 1915. The Daito Railway was nationalized on 1 December 1922, after which Japanese Government Railways (JGR) undertook phased westward expansion of the track which, at the time, it had designated as the Daito Line. By 1926, the track had reached Noya. Subsequently, the track was extended further west and Bungo-Nakamura was opened as the new western terminus on 28 October 1928. On 15 December 1929, Bungo-Nakamura became a through-station when the track was again extended to Bungo-Mori. On 15 November 1934, when the Daito Line had linked up with the Kyudai Main Line further west, JGR designated the station as part of the Kyudai Main Line. With the privatization of Japanese National Railways (JNR), the successor of JGR, on 1 April 1987, the station came under the control of JR Kyushu.

The original station building was a Japanese style timber building with a tiled roof. This was rebuilt in 2010 by Kokonoe Town authorities. The new building was still in traditional Japanese style with white plaster walls and a thatched roof. In April 2011, local residents opened a cafeteria in the station building which served meals made from local ingredients but this closed in March 2013. Subsequently, the Kokonoe Town Tourism Association moved its offices to the station building and set up an information centre there in October 2013.

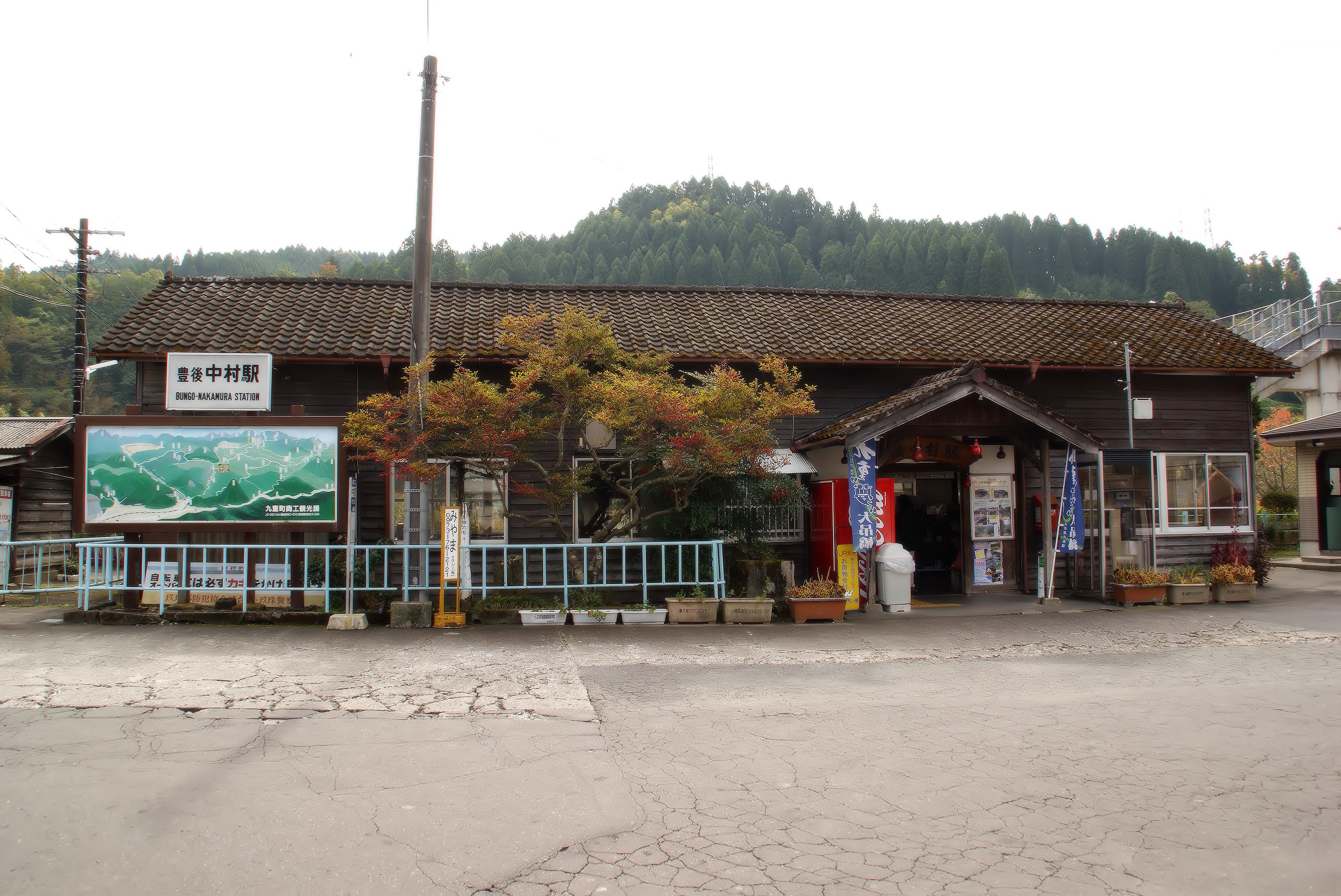
The old station building. This picture was taken in 2008.

== Passenger statistics ==
In fiscal 2015, there were a total of 28,340 boarding passengers, giving a daily average of 78 passengers.

== Surrounding area ==
- Kokonoe Town Nogami Elementary School
- Kokonoe Town Midoriyo Junior High School
- Japan National Route 210

== See also ==
- List of railway stations in Japan
