= Teruoka Station =

Railway station in Hita, Ōita Prefecture, Japan

Teruoka Station 光岡駅
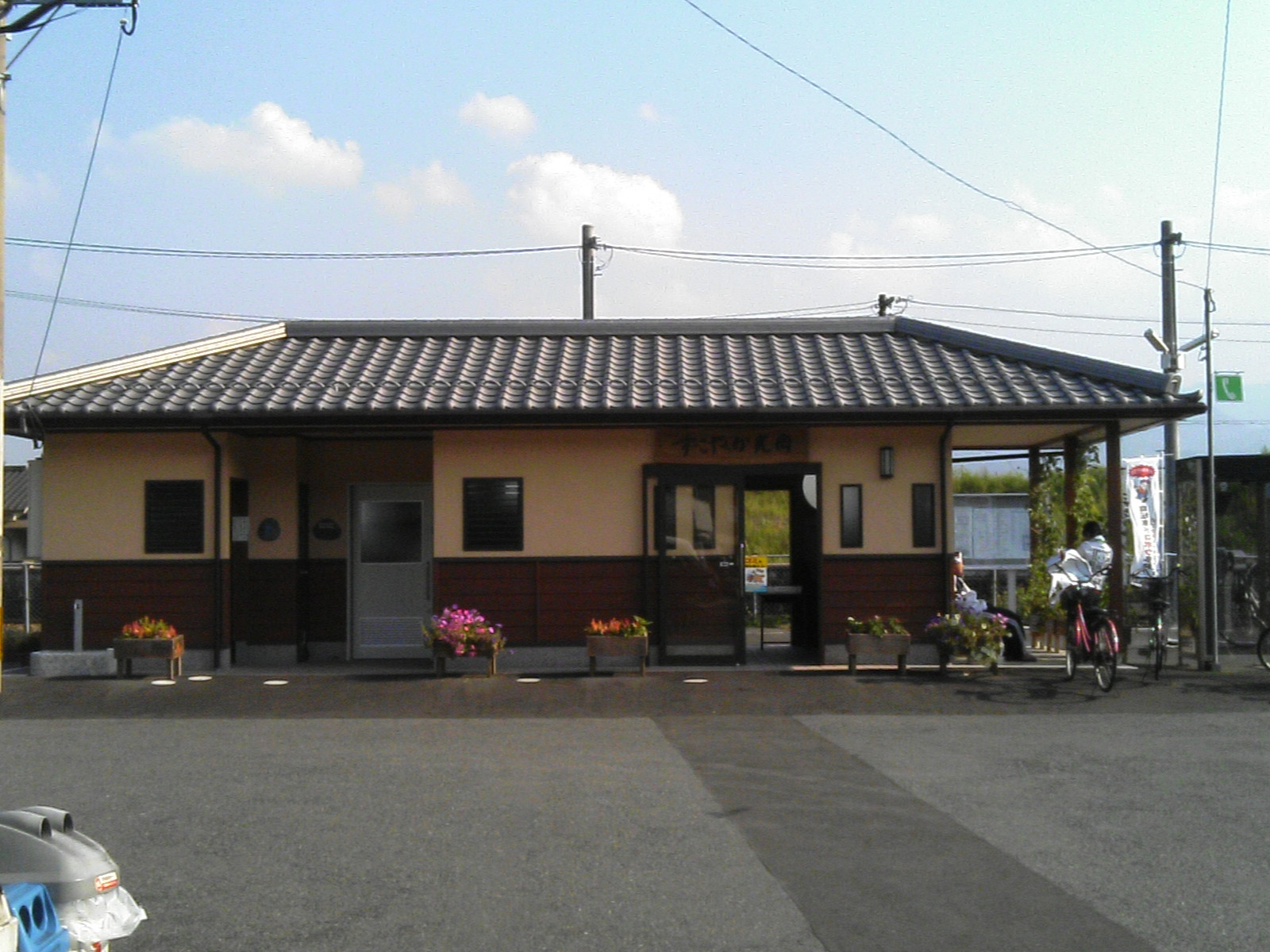
- Teruoka Station in 2007

General information
- Location: Tomoda, Hita-shi, Ōita-ken 877-0078; Japan
- Coordinates: 33°19′39″N 130°55′12″E
- Operator: JR Kyushu
- Line: ■ Kyūdai Main Line
- Distance: 45.2 km from Kurume
- Platforms: 1 island platform
- Tracks: 2

Construction
- Structure type: At grade

Other information
- Status: Unstaffed
- Website: Official website

History
- Opened: 3 March 1934

Passengers
- FY2015: 114 daily

Services
Preceding station	JR Kyushu	Following station
Yoake towards Kurume	Kyūdai Main Line	Hita towards Ōita
Location
- Location within Oita Prefecture Location within Japan

Teruoka Station (光岡駅, Teruoka-eki) is a passenger railway station on the Kyūdai Main Line operated by JR Kyushu in Hita, Ōita Prefecture, Japan.

== Lines ==
The station is served by the Kyūdai Main Line and is located 45.2 km from the starting point of the line at Kurume.

== Layout ==
The station consists of an island platform serving two tracks with a siding. The station building is a modern structure but built in traditional Japanese style with a tiled roof. It is unstaffed and serves only as a waiting room. Access to the island platform is by means of a level crossing.

=== Platforms ===
1, 2	■ ■ Kyūdai Main Line	for Kurume
2	■ ■ Kyūdai Main Line	for Hita

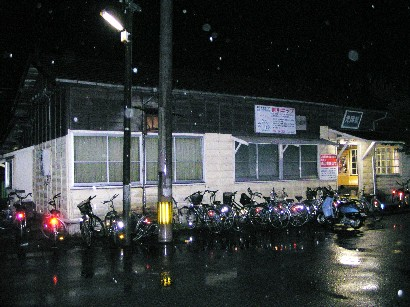
The old station building. This picture was taken in 2005

== History ==
Japanese Government Railways (JGR) had opened the Kyudai Main Line on 24 December 1928 with a track between Kurume and Chikugo-Yoshii and had extended the line east to Yoake by 12 March 1932. In a further phase of expansion, the track was extended east with Hita opening as the eastern terminus on 3 March 1934. Teruoka opened on the same day as an intermediate station on the track. With the privatization of Japanese National Railways (JNR), the successor of JGR, on 1 April 1987, JR Kyushu took over control of the station.

In July 2017, torrential rainfall led to the railway bridge across the Kagetsugawa River about 1 km east of the station being swept away, cutting the line. Through service between Teruoka and the next station at Hita was suspended. JR Kyushu said it intended to resume service by the summer of 2018 On 14 July 2018 section of the Kyudai Main Line between Mitsuoka Station and Hita Station reopened. However, the Hitahikosan Line was replaced in 2023 by a BRT service.

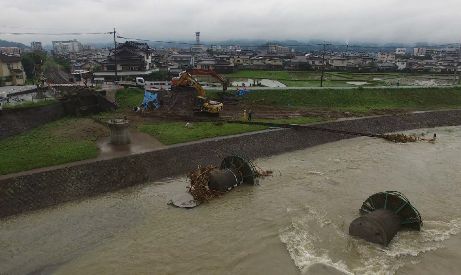
The collapsed bridge over the Kagetsugawa River.

== Passenger statistics ==
In fiscal 2015, there were a total of 41,755 boarding passengers, giving a daily average of 114 passengers.

== Surrounding area ==
- Hita City Teruoka Elementary School

== See also ==
- List of railway stations in Japan
