= Hikiji Station =

Railway station in Kokonoe, Ōita Prefecture, Japan

Hikiji Station 引治駅
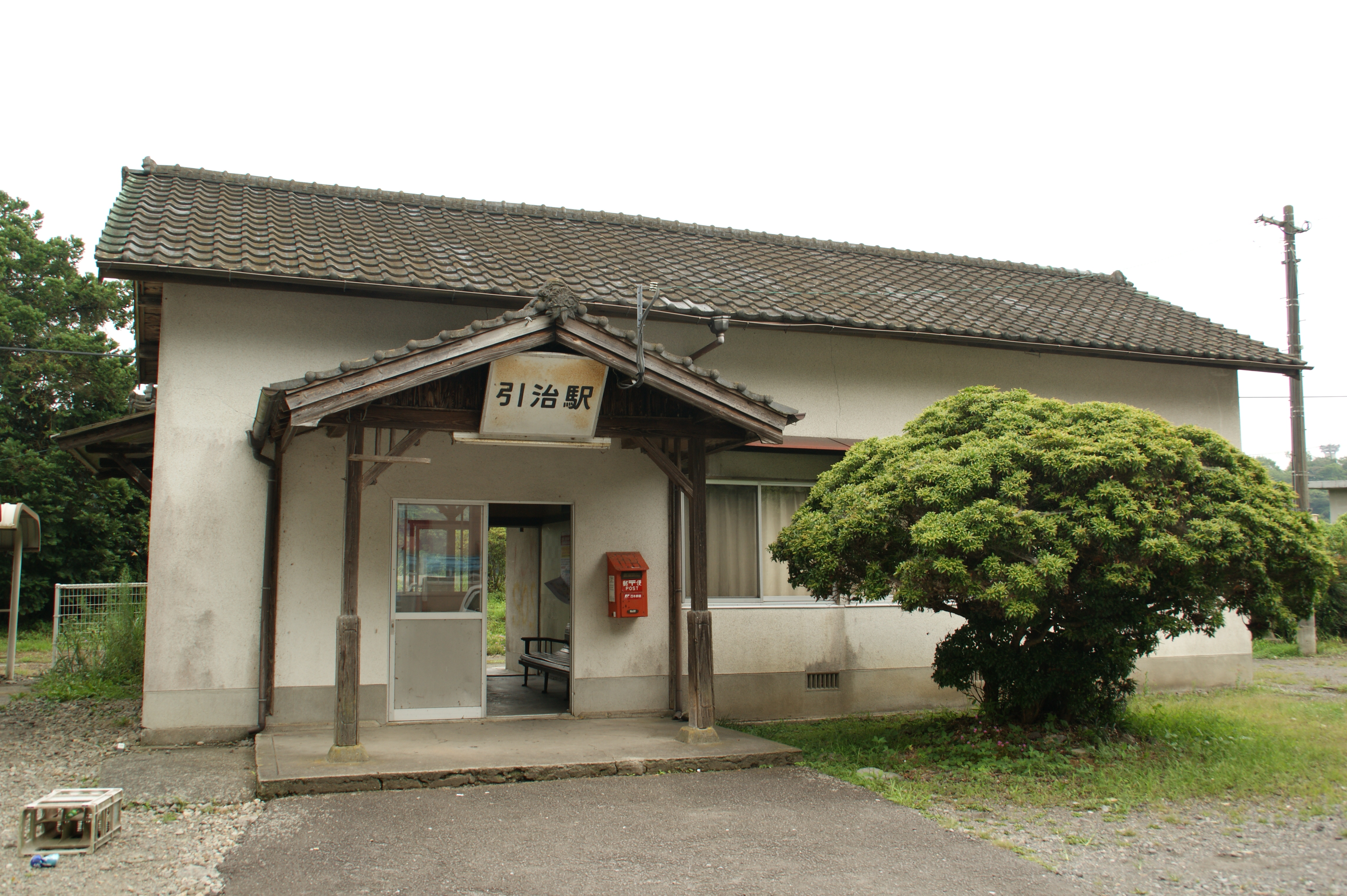
- Hikiji Station in 2008

General information
- Location: Machida, Kokonoe-cho, Kusu-gun, Ōita-ken 879-4723; Japan
- Coordinates: 33°13′45″N 131°11′01″E
- Operator: JR Kyushu
- Line: ■ Kyūdai Main Line
- Distance: 80.7 km from Kurume
- Platforms: 1 side platform
- Tracks: 1

Construction
- Structure type: At grade
- Accessible: Yes - around the side

Other information
- Status: Unstaffed
- Website: Official website

History
- Opened: 15 December 1929

Passengers
- FY2015: 48 daily

Services
Preceding station	JR Kyushu	Following station
Era towards Kurume	Kyūdai Main Line	Bungo-Nakamura towards Ōita
Location
- Location within Oita Prefecture Location within Japan

Hikiji Station (引治駅, Hikiji-eki) is a passenger railway station located in the town of Kokonoe, Ōita Prefecture, Japan. It is operated by JR Kyushu.

== Lines ==
The station is served by the Kyūdai Main Line and is located 80.7 km from the starting point of the line at Kurume.

== Layout ==
The station consists of a side platform serving a single track at grade. The station building is a small structure of traditional Japanese plaster wall design which is unstaffed and serves only as a waiting room. From the station building, a short flight of steps leads up to the platform.

== History ==
The private Daito Railway (大湯鉄道) had opened a track between Ōita and Onoya in 1915. The Daito Railway was nationalized on 1 December 1922, after which Japanese Government Railways (JGR) undertook phased westward expansion of the track which, at the time, it had designated as the Daito Line. By 1928, the track had reached Bungo-Nakamura. Subsequently, the track was extended further west and Bungo-Mori was opened as the new western terminus on 15 December 1929. On the same day, Hikiji was opened as an intermediate station along the new track. On 15 November 1934, when the Daito Line had linked up with the Kyudai Main Line further west, JGR designated the station as part of the Kyudai Main Line. With the privatization of Japanese National Railways (JNR), the successor of JGR, on 1 April 1987, the station came under the control of JR Kyushu.

== Passenger statistics ==
In fiscal 2015, there were a total of 17,379 boarding passengers, giving a daily average of 48 passengers.

== Surrounding area ==
- Kokonoe Town Hall
- Japan National Route 210

== See also ==
- List of railway stations in Japan
