= Hikiji =

Hikiji may refer to:

- Hikiji Station (引治駅), a railway station on the Kyūdai Main Line in Kokonoe, Ōita Prefecture, Japan
- Hikiji River (引地川), a river in Kanagawa Prefecture, Japan
- Miyoko Hikiji, a candidate in the 2016 Iowa Senate election
- Lord Hikiji, a power-hungry daimyō in Stan Sakai's Usagi Yojimbo comic

== See also ==
- Hijiki, a type of brown seaweed
- Hikichi
