= Furugō Station =

Railway station in Ōita, Ōita Prefecture, Japan

Furugō Station 古国府駅
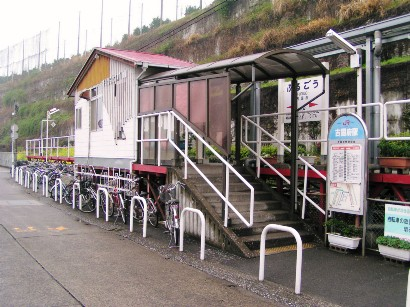
- Entrance of Furugō Station, 2005.

General information
- Location: 3-chōme-5 Furugō, Ōita-shi, Ōita-ken, 870-084; Japan
- Coordinates: 33°13′14″N 131°36′28″E
- Operator: JR Kyushu
- Line: ■ Kyūdai Main Line
- Distance: 138.9 km from Kurume
- Platforms: 1 side platform
- Tracks: 1

Construction
- Structure type: At grade
- Accessible: No - steps to platform

Other information
- Status: Unstaffed
- Website: Official website

History
- Opened: 30 October 1915

Passengers
- FY2016: 450 daily
- Rank: 255th (among JR Kyushu stations)

Services
Preceding station	JR Kyushu	Following station
Minami-Ōita towards Kurume	Kyūdai Main Line	Ōita Terminus
Location
- Location within Oita Prefecture Location within Japan

Furugō Station (古国府駅, Furugō-eki) is a passenger railway station located in Ōita City, Ōita Prefecture, Japan. It is operated by JR Kyushu.

== Lines ==
The station is served by the Kyūdai Main Line and is located 138.9 km from the starting point of the line at Kurume.

== Layout ==
The station, which is unstaffed, consists of a side platform serving a single track. There is no station building. The shelter on the platform has a ticket window which is now unstaffed. An automatic ticket vending machine, a SUGOCA charge machine and a SUGOCA card reader are provided.

== History ==
The private Daito Railway (大湯鉄道) opened a track from Ōita to Onoya on 30 October 1915. This station was opened on the same day as one of several intermediate stations along the track. On 1 December 1922, the Daito Railway was nationalized and absorbed into Japanese Government Railways, (JGR) which closed the station. The station was reopened on 13 March 1988 by JR Kyushu, which had assumed control of the line and assets after the Japanese National Railways (the successor to JGR) was privatized on 1 April 1987.

== Passenger statistics ==
In fiscal 2016, the station was used by an average of 450 passengers daily (boarding passengers only), and it ranked 255th among the busiest stations of JR Kyushu.

== Surrounding area ==
- Oita City Toyofu Elementary School
- Oita Prefectural Oita Uenogaoka High School
- Oita City Museum of Art,

== See also ==
- List of railway stations in Japan
