= Kurume-Kōkōmae Station =

Railway station in Kurume, Fukuoka Prefecture, Japan

Kurume-Kōkōmae Station 久留米高校前駅
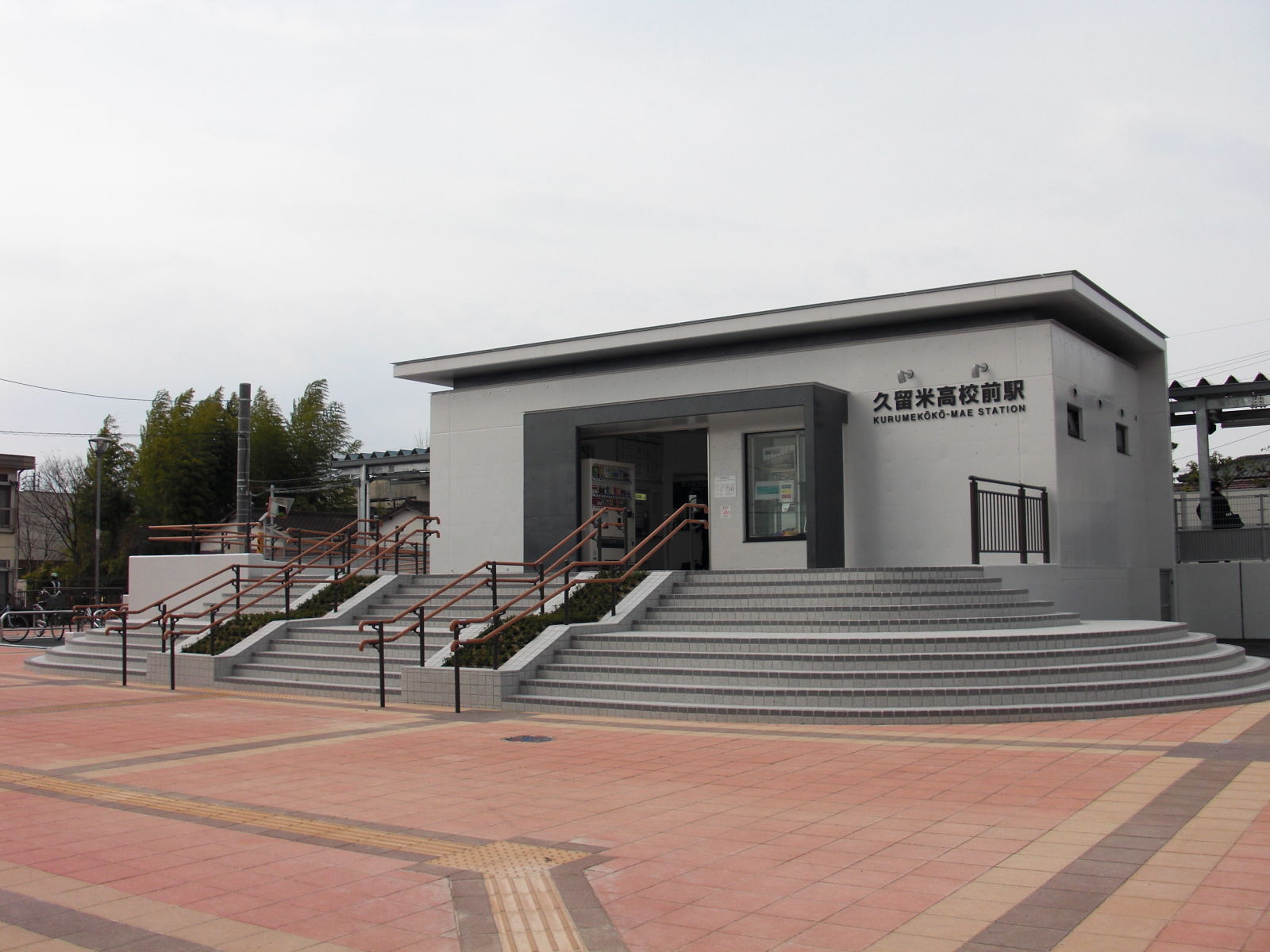
- Kurume-Kōkōmae Station in 2009

General information
- Location: 448-2 Nishimachi, Kurume-shi, Fukuoka-ken 830-0038; Japan
- Coordinates: 33°17′55″N 130°30′59″E
- Operator: JR Kyushu
- Line: Kyūdai Main Line
- Distance: 3.4 km (2.1 mi) from Kurume
- Platforms: 1 side platform
- Tracks: 1

Construction
- Structure type: At grade

Other information
- Status: Staffed ticket window (outsourced)
- Website: Official website

History
- Opened: 14 March 2009

Passengers
- FY2020: 569 daily
- Rank: 200th (among JR Kyushu stations)

Services
Preceding station	JR Kyushu	Following station
Kurume Terminus	Kyūdai Main Line	Minami-Kurume towards Ōita
Location
- Location within Fukuoka Prefecture Location within Japan

Kurume-Kōkōmae Station (久留米高校前駅, Kurume-Kōkōmae-eki) is a passenger railway station located in the city of Kurume, Fukuoka Prefecture, Japan. It is operated by JR Kyushu. The station name refers to the nearby Kurume High School.

== Lines ==
The station is served by the Kyudai Main Line and is located 3.4 km from the starting point of the line at Kurume. Only local trains on the line stop at the station.

== Layout ==
The station consists of a side platform serving a single track. The station building is a modern concrete structure which houses a waiting room, automatic ticket vending machine, a Sugoca charge machine, a Sugoca reader and a staffed ticket window.

Management of the station has been outsourced to the JR Kyushu Tetsudou Eigyou Co., a wholly owned subsidiary of JR Kyushu specialising in station services. It staffs the ticket counter which is equipped with a POS machine but does not have a Midori no Madoguchi facility.

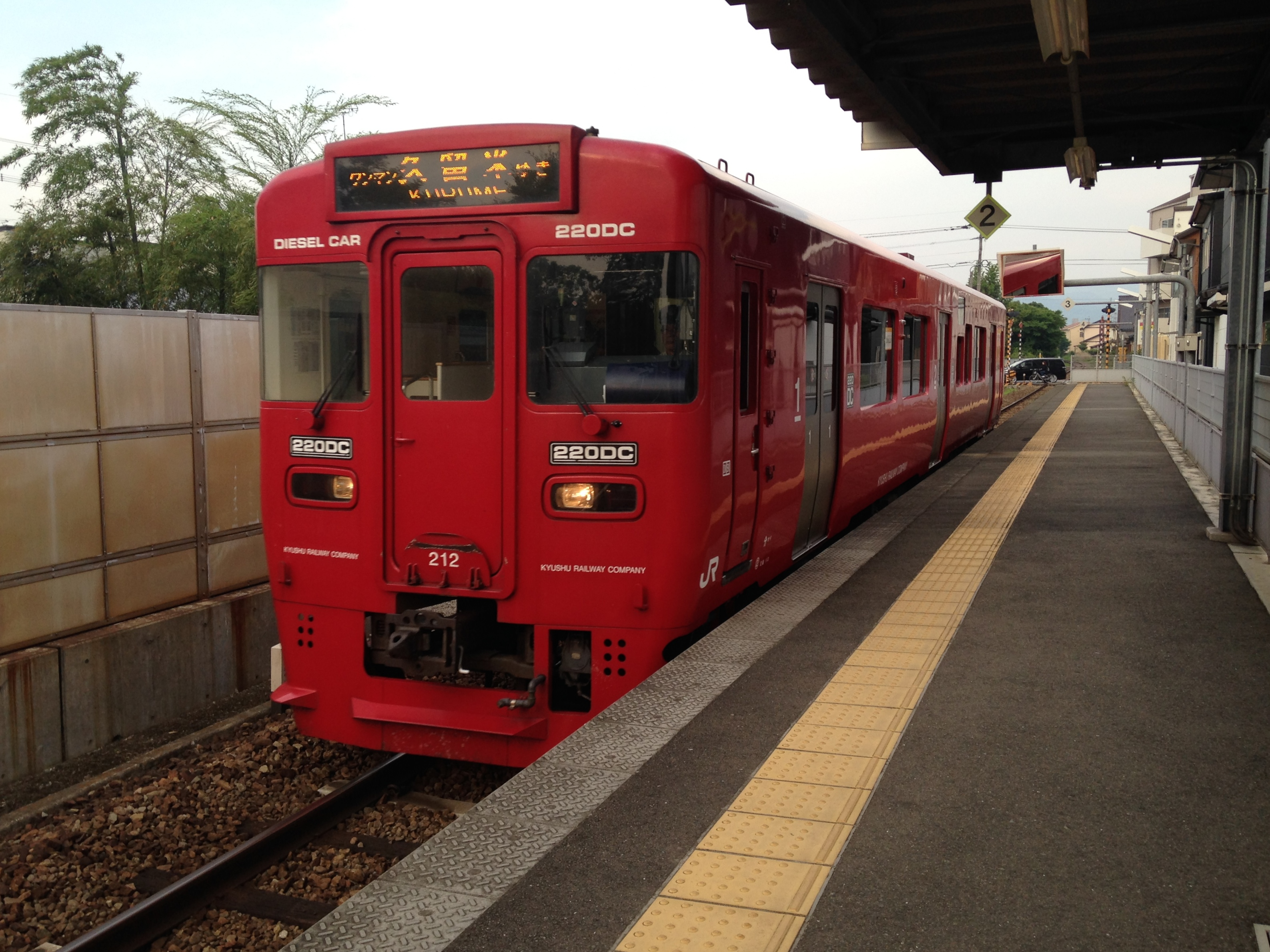
A view of the platform and track.

== History ==
JR Kyushu opened the station on 14 March 2009 as an additional station on the existing track of the Kyudai Main Line.

== Passenger statistics ==
In fiscal 2020, the station was used by an average of 569 passengers daily (boarding passengers only), and it ranked 200th among the busiest stations of JR Kyushu.

== Surrounding area ==
- Fukuoka Prefectural Kurume High School
- Kurume City Kurume Commercial High School
- Kurume Junior High School attached to Fukuoka University of Education

== See also ==
- List of railway stations in Japan
