= Bungo-Mori Station =

Railway station in Kusu, Ōita Prefecture, Japan

Bungo-Mori Station 豊後森駅
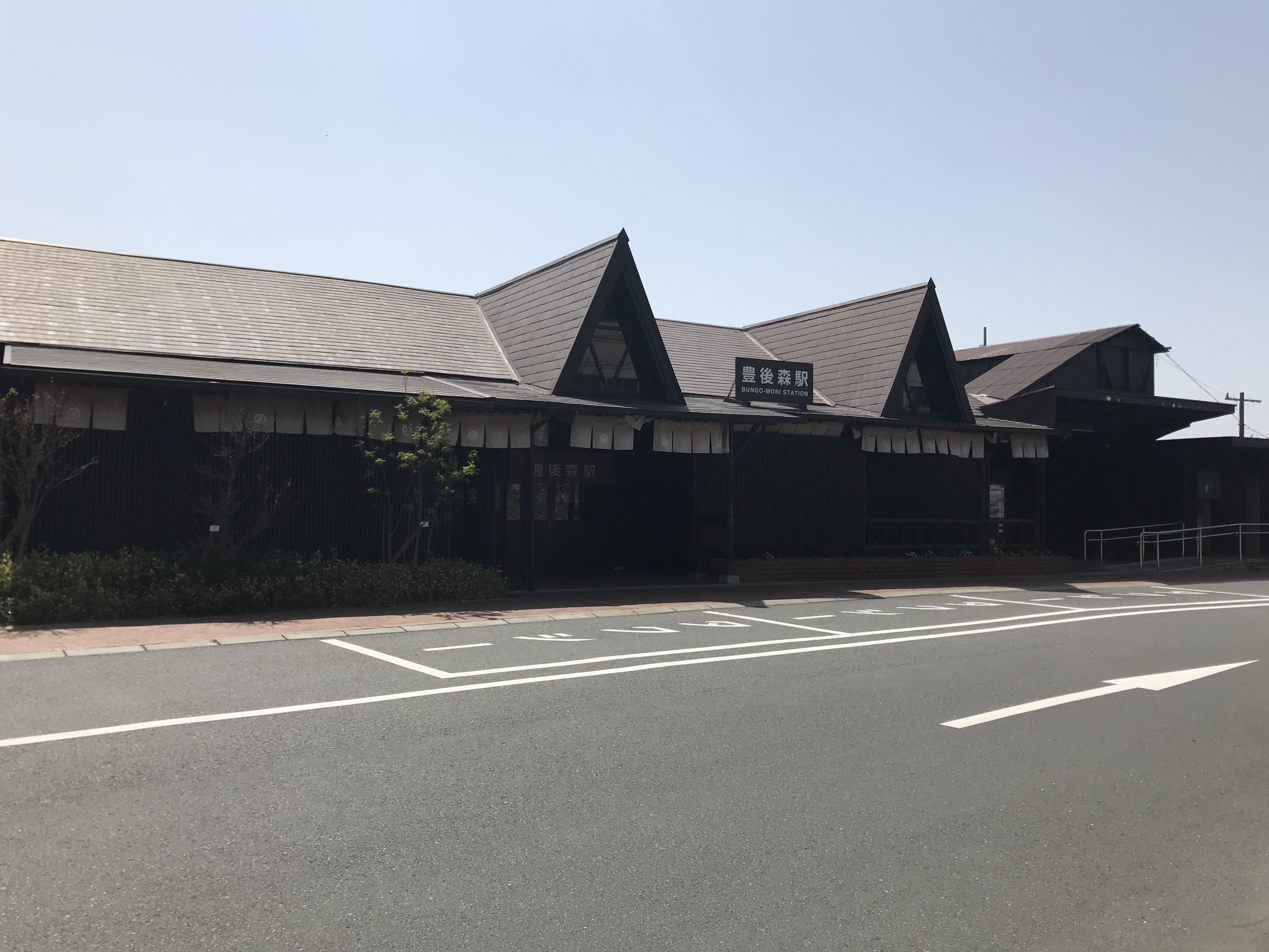
- Bungo-Mori Station in 2018.

General information
- Location: 245-5 Hoashi, Kusu-cho, Kusu-gun, Ōita-ken 879-4403; Japan
- Coordinates: 33°16′58″N 131°09′18″E
- Operator: JR Kyushu
- Line: ■ Kyūdai Main Line
- Distance: 73.2 km from Kurume
- Platforms: 1 side + 1 island platforms
- Tracks: 3 + multiple passing loops and sidings

Construction
- Structure type: At grade
- Accessible: No - platforms linked by footbridge

Other information
- Status: Staffed ticket window (outsourced)
- Website: Official website

History
- Opened: 15 December 1929

Passengers
- FY2016: 338 daily
- Rank: 292nd (among JR Kyushu stations)

Services
Preceding station	JR Kyushu	Following station
Kita-Yamada towards Kurume	Kyūdai Main Line	Era towards Ōita
Location
- Location within Oita Prefecture Location within Japan

Bungo-Mori Station (豊後森駅, Bungo-Mori-eki) is a passenger railway station located in the town of Kusu, Ōita Prefecture, Japan. It is operated by JR Kyushu.

== Lines ==
The station is served by the Kyūdai Main Line and is located 73.2 km from the starting point of the line at Kurume.

== Layout ==
The station consists of a side platform and an island platform serving three tracks at grade. The station building is timber structure, remodelled in 2013, built in traditional Japanese style with tiled roofs and steeply angled eaves. It houses a waiting area and a staffed ticket window. Access to the island platform is by means of a footbridge. To the south of the station are multiple passing loops and sidings.

Management of the station has been outsourced to the JR Kyushu Tetsudou Eigyou Co., a wholly owned subsidiary of JR Kyushu specialising in station services. It staffs the ticket counter which is equipped with a POS machine but does not have a Midori no Madoguchi facility.

=== Platforms ===
1, 2, 3	■ ■ Kyūdai Main Line	for Hita and Kurume; Yufuin and Ōita

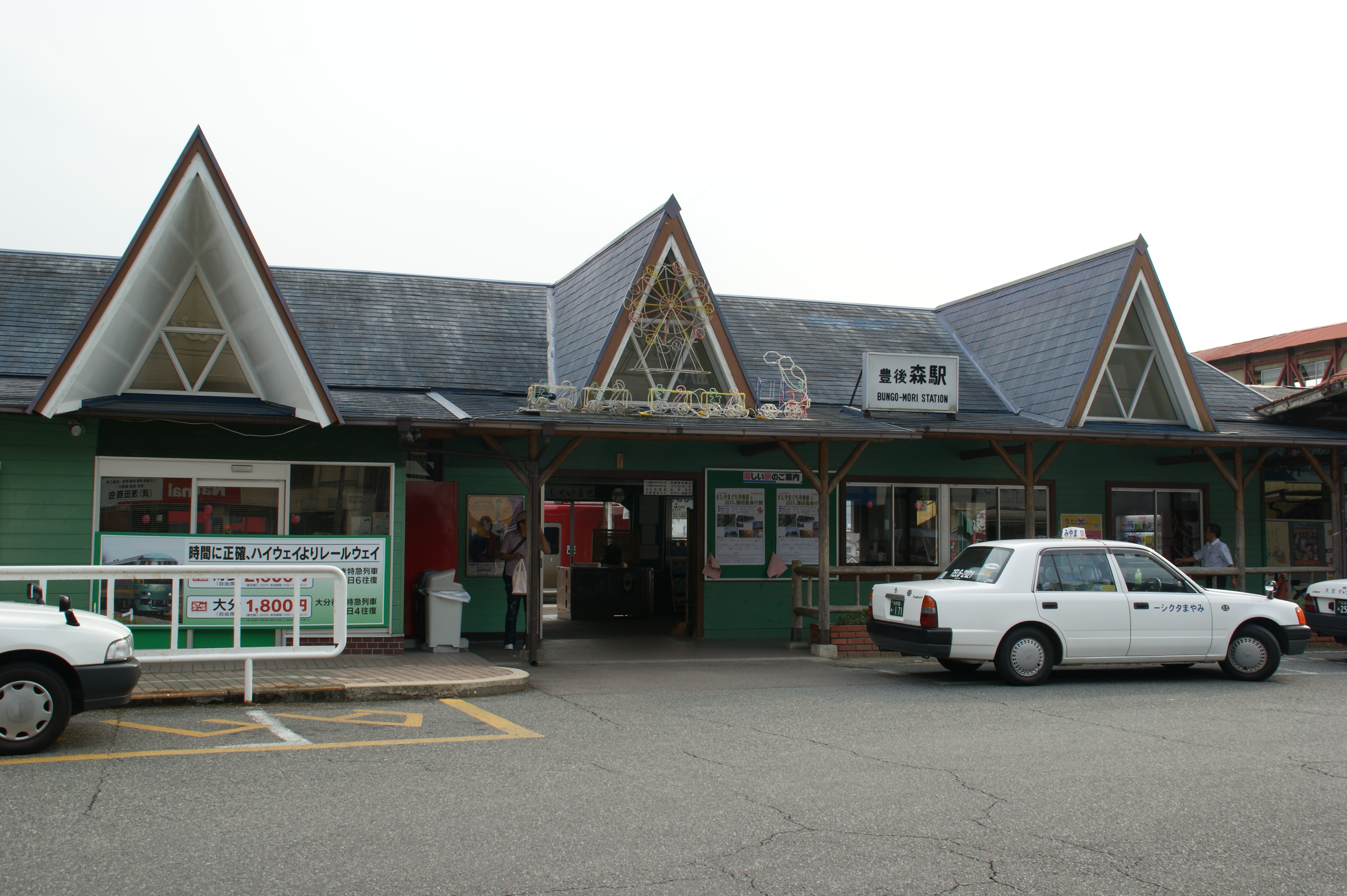
The station building in 2008, before the remodeling.

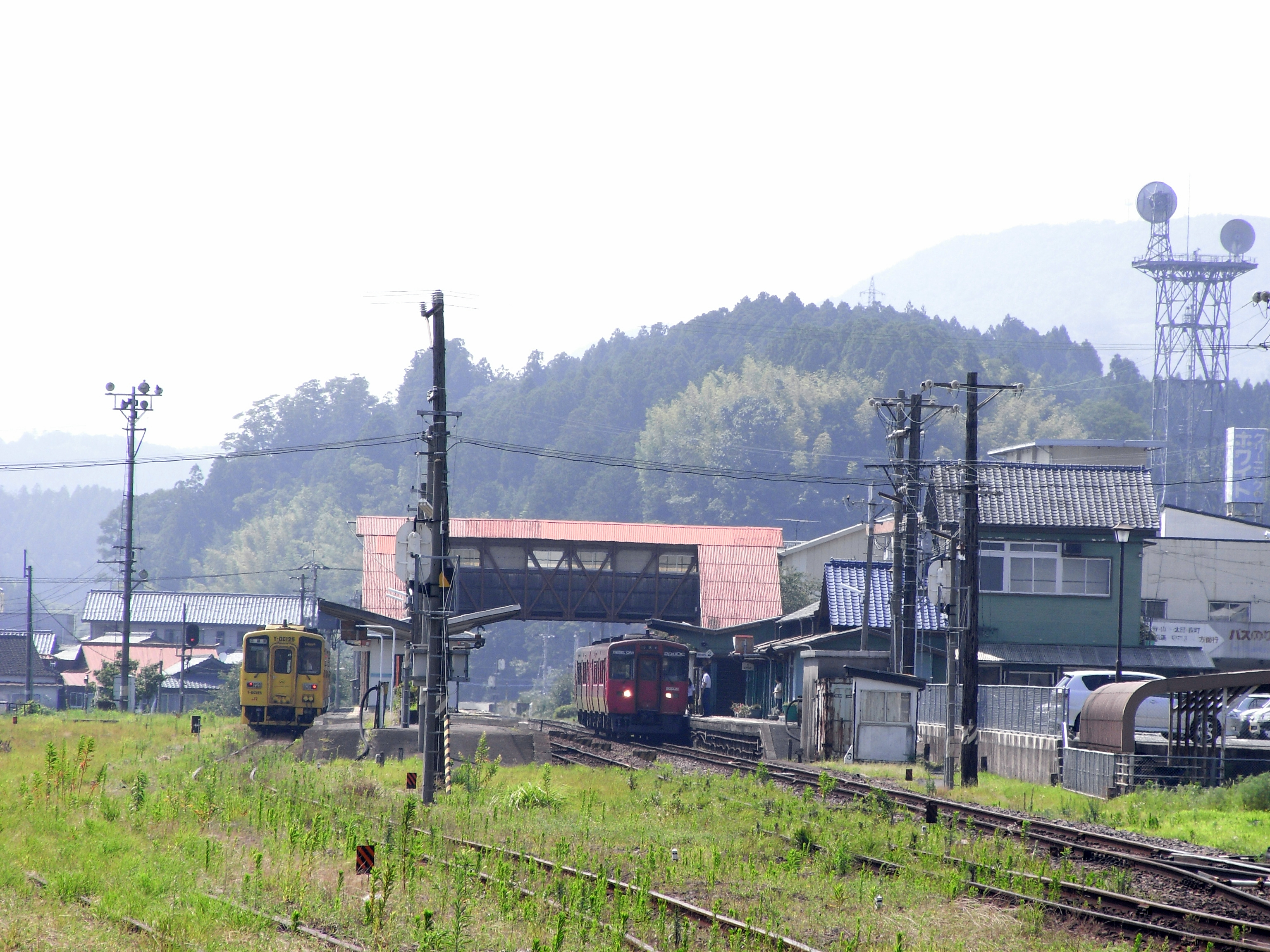
The platforms and tracks in 2007.

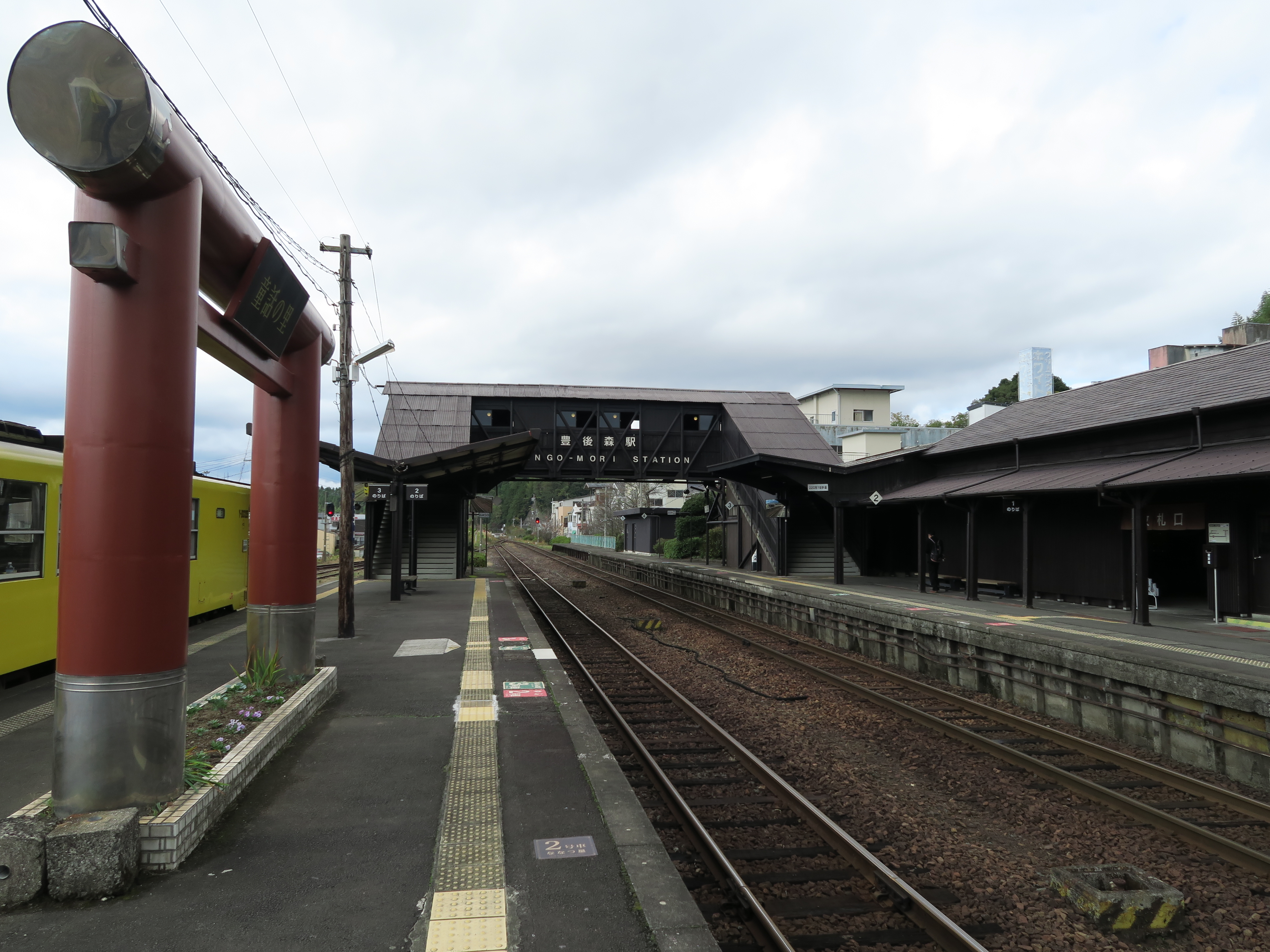
The platforms and tracks in 2015, after the remodeling. Note the torii gate which was not there in 2007.

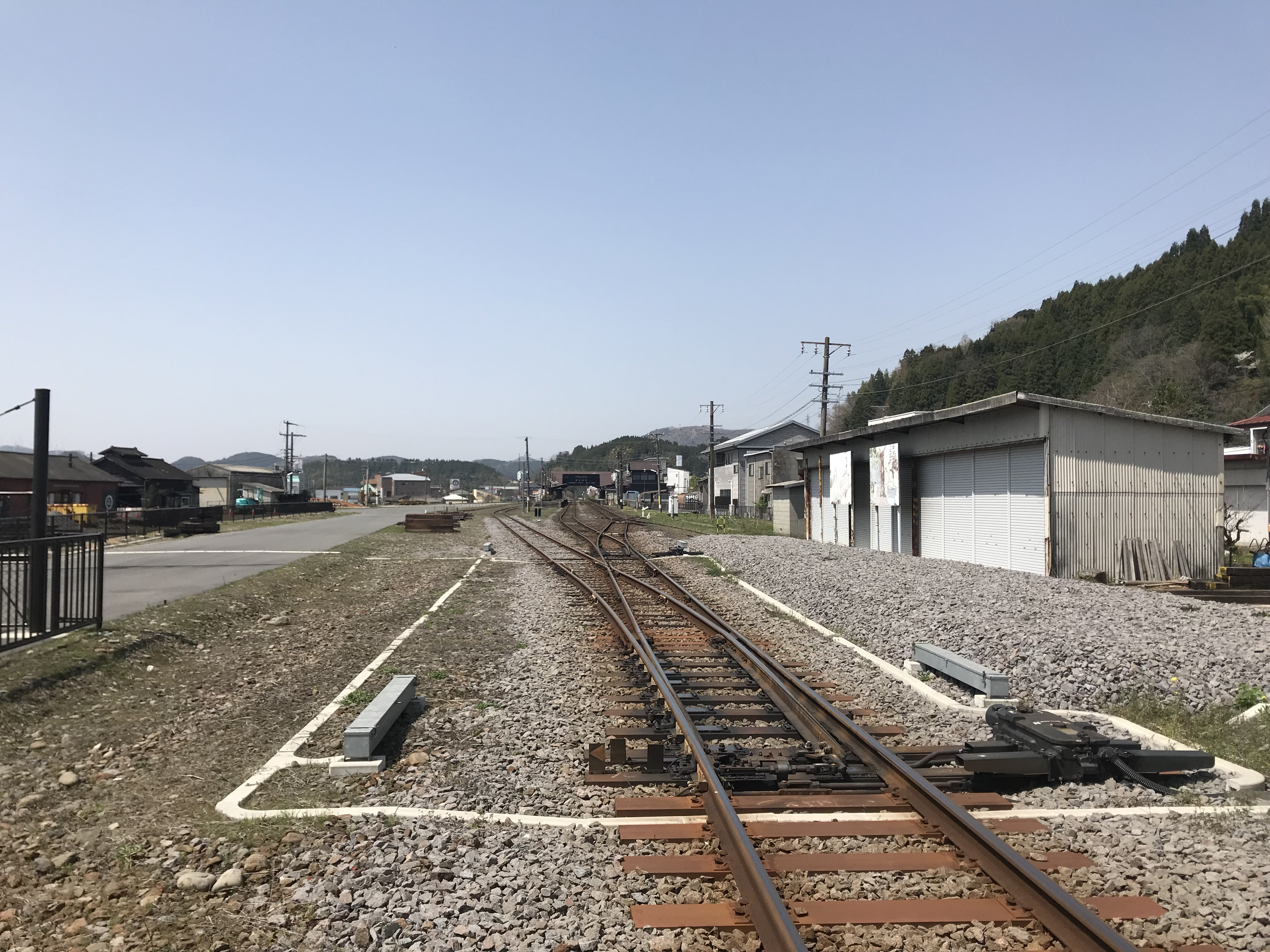
A view of the sidings and passing loops south of the station.

== History ==
The private Daito Railway (大湯鉄道) had opened a track between Ōita and Onoya in 1915. The Daito Railway was nationalized on 1 December 1922, after which Japanese Government Railways (JGR) undertook phased westward expansion of the track which, at the time, it had designated as the Daito Line. By 1928, the track had reached Bungo-Nakamura. Subsequently, the track was extended further west and Bungo-Mori was opened as the new western terminus on 15 December 1929. On 16 September 1932, Bungo-Mori became a through-station when the track was again extended to Kita-Yamada. On 15 November 1934, when the Daito Line had linked up with the Kyudai Main Line further west, JGR designated the station as part of the Kyudai Main Line. With the privatization of Japanese National Railways (JNR), the successor of JGR, on 1 April 1987, the station came under the control of JR Kyushu.

In 2013, the station building was renovated in preparation for the arrival of the luxury train Seven Stars in Kyushu. The station building, station furniture, roof and footbridge were all remodeled in a deep brown colour to reflect an "earth and forest" theme in deference to the location of the station. In 2014, the renovation works won an award from the Japan Association of Railway Architects.

== Passenger statistics ==
In fiscal 2016, the station was used by an average of 338 passengers daily (boarding passengers only), and it ranked 292nd among the busiest stations of JR Kyushu.

== Surrounding area ==
- Oita Prefectural Kusu Miyama High School (formerly Oita Prefectural Kusu Agricultural High School/Oita Prefectural Mori High School)
- Kusu Town Hall
- Bungo-Mori Roundhouse

== See also ==
- List of railway stations in Japan
