= Kyūdai Main Line =

Railway line in Kyushu, Japan

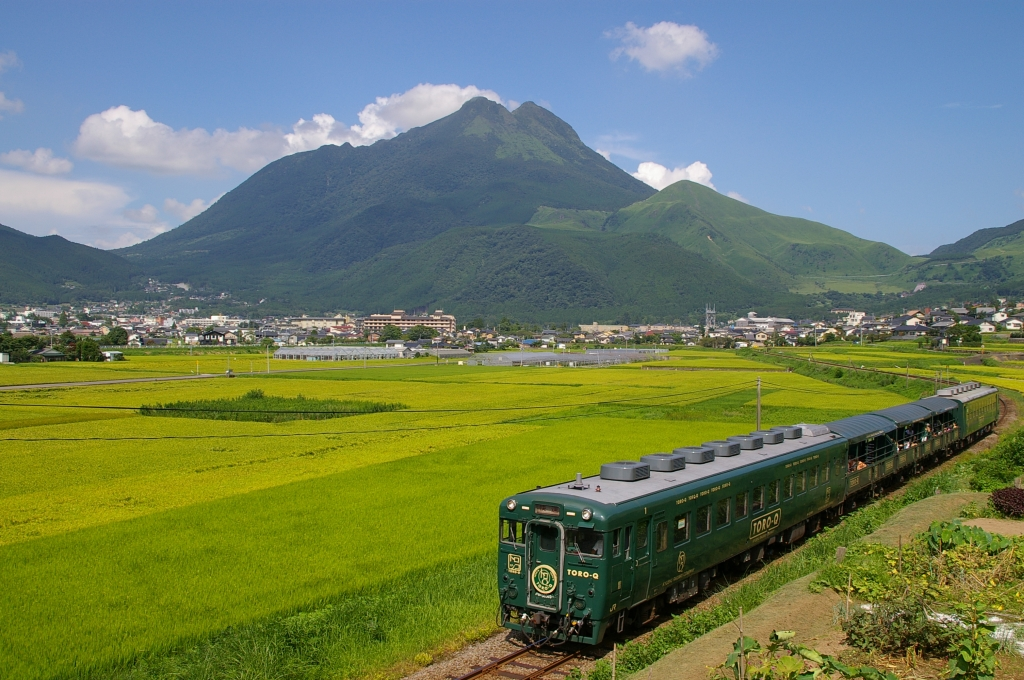
- KiHa 58 DMU between Yufuin and Minami-Yufu

Overview
- Status: In operation
- Owner: JR Kyushu
- Locale: Kyushu
- Termini: Kurume; Ōita
- Stations: 37

Service
- Type: Heavy rail
- Operator(s): JR Kyushu
- Rolling stock: KiHa 71 series DMU, KiHa 72 series DMU, KiHa 185 series DMU, KiHa 40 series DMU, KiHa 200 series DMU, KiHa 125 series DMU, DF200 Diesel locomotive, DE10 Diesel locomotive, 77 series passenger cars

History
- Opened: 30 October 1915; 110 years ago

Technical
- Line length: 141.5 km (87.9 mi)
- Number of tracks: Entire line single tracked
- Character: Mostly rural with a few urban areas
- Track gauge: 1,067 mm (3 ft 6 in)
- Electrification: None
- Operating speed: 95 km/h (59 mph)
- Signalling: Automatic block signaling
Route map
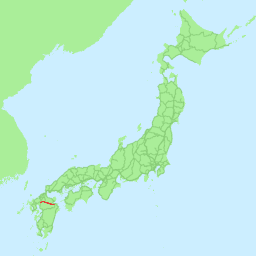

The Kyūdai Main Line (久大本線, Kyūdai-honsen) is a railway line in Kyushu, Japan, operated by the Kyushu Railway Company (JR Kyushu). It connects Kurume Station, Kurume in Fukuoka Prefecture and Ōita Station, Ōita in Ōita Prefecture. It is also known as the Yufu Kōgen Line.

The line crosses the whole of Kyushu, approximately paralleling the Chikugo River and its tributary the Kusu River near Kurume, and along the Ōita River close to Ōita. It also traverses popular tourist resorts such as Hita (known as Little Kyoto) and spa resorts around Yufu.

== Stations ==
Station		Distance (km)	Transfers	Location	
Kurume	久留米	0.0	JB Kagoshima Main Line Kyushu Shinkansen	Kurume	Fukuoka
Kurume-Kōkōmae	久留米高校前	3.4		Kurume	Fukuoka
Minami-Kurume	南久留米	4.9		Kurume	Fukuoka
Kurume-Daigakumae	久留米大学前	6.8		Kurume	Fukuoka
Mii	御井	8.0		Kurume	Fukuoka
Zendōji	善導寺	12.6		Kurume	Fukuoka
Chikugo-Kusano	筑後草野	15.7		Kurume	Fukuoka
Tanushimaru	田主丸	20.8		Kurume	Fukuoka
Chikugo-Yoshii	筑後吉井	26.4		Ukiha	Fukuoka
Ukiha	うきは	30.0		Ukiha	Fukuoka
Chikugo-Ōishi	筑後大石	33.0		Ukiha	Fukuoka
Yoake	夜明	39.1	■ Hitahikosan Line (No service since July 2017 due to rainstorm damage, was replaced by bus rapid transit in August 2023)	Hita	Ōita
Teruoka	光岡	45.2		Hita	Ōita
Hita	日田	47.6		Hita	Ōita
Bungo-Miyoshi	豊後三芳	49.4		Hita	Ōita
Bungo-Nakagawa	豊後中川	55.3		Hita	Ōita
Amagase	天ケ瀬	59.5		Hita	Ōita
Sugikawachi	杉河内	63.6		Kusu	Ōita
Kita-Yamada	北山田	67.8		Kusu	Ōita
Bungo-Mori	豊後森	73.2		Kusu	Ōita
Era	恵良	77.3		Kokonoe	Ōita
Hikiji	引治	80.7		Kokonoe	Ōita
Bungo-Nakamura	豊後中村	83.1		Kokonoe	Ōita
Noya	野矢	88.2		Kokonoe	Ōita
Yufuin	由布院	99.1		Yufu	Ōita
Minami-Yufu	南由布	102.5		Yufu	Ōita
Yunohira	湯平	109.6		Yufu	Ōita
Shōnai	庄内	114.5		Yufu	Ōita
Tenjinyama	天神山	118.1		Yufu	Ōita
Onoya	小野屋	119.6		Yufu	Ōita
Onigase	鬼瀬	124.6		Yufu	Ōita
Mukainoharu	向之原	127.7		Yufu	Ōita
Bungo-Kokubu	豊後国分	131.7		Ōita	Ōita
Kaku	賀来	133.9		Ōita	Ōita
Minami-Ōita	南大分	136.6		Ōita	Ōita
Furugō	古国府	138.9		Ōita	Ōita
Ōita	大分	141.5	■ Nippō Main Line ■ Hōhi Main Line	Ōita	Ōita

== History ==
In 1915, the Daito Railway Co. opened the 22 km Oita - Onoya section. The company was nationalised in 1922, and westerly extensions were undertaken in stages from 1923 until Amagase was reached in 1933. The Kurume - Chikugoyoshi opened in 1928, and easterly extensions to Amagase opened between 1931 and 1934.

CTC signalling was commissioned over the entire line in 1984, and freight services ceased in 1987.

=== Typhoon damage ===
In 2012, a landslide disrupted services for 6 weeks.

On 5 July 2017, torrential rainfall washed out the bridge over the Oita River between Chikugo Oisha and Teruoka, resulting in the closure of the section. According to the Japanese language Wikipedia article, the line was fully re-opened on 14 July 2018.

=== Previous connecting/transfer lines ===
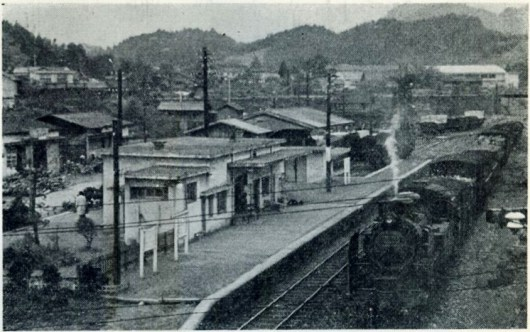
Higo-oguni station, ~1962

- Era Station: the 27 km Miyanoharu Line to Higo-oguni opened between 1937 and 1954. Freight services ceased in 1971, and the line closed on 1 December 1984.
- Kurume Station: the 46 km 3 ft (914 mm) gauge Chigoku Line to Mameda opened between 1904 and 1916, and was electrified at 600 V DC in 1919. It had three short branch lines (1 to 4 km long). The entire system closed in 1929.
