= Hikichi =

Hikichi (written: 曳地 or 挽地 or 引地) is a Japanese surname. Notable people with the surname include:

- Yuya Hikichi (挽地 祐哉, born 1983), Japanese footballer

== See also ==
- Hikiji (disambiguation)
