= Kokonoe, Ōita =

Kokonoe 九重町
- Town
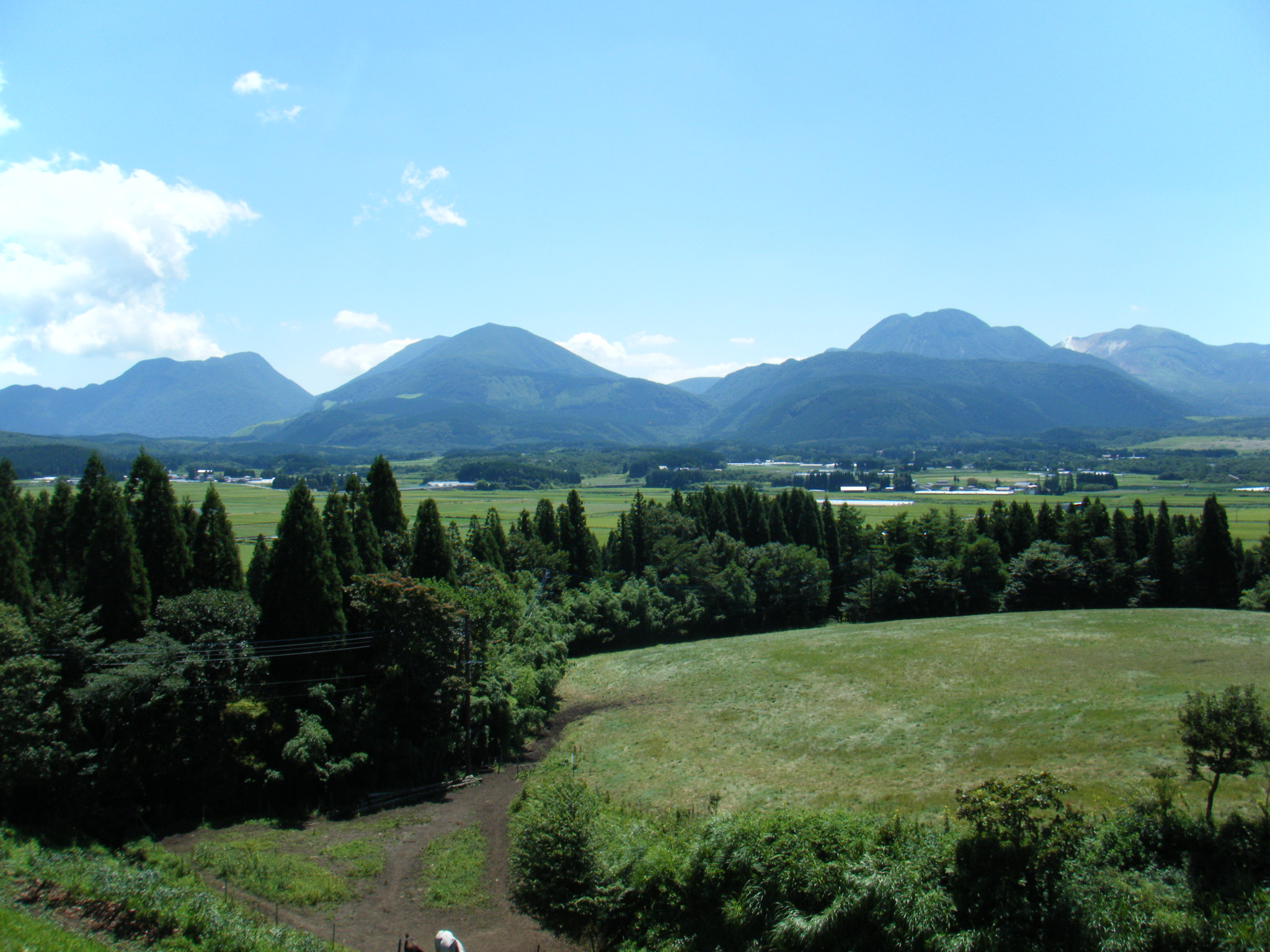
- View of the Kokonoe Mountain Range from Asahidai on Iida Plateau

- Flag Chapter
- Interactive map of Kokonoe
- Location in Japan
- Coordinates: 33°13′42″N 131°11′20″E
- Country: Japan
- Region: Kyushu
- Prefecture: Ōita
- District: Kusu

Area
  - Total: 271.37 km^{2} (104.78 sq mi)

Population (November 30, 2023)
  - Total: 8,536
  - Density: 31.46/km^{2} (81.47/sq mi)
- Time zone: UTC+09:00 (JST)
- City hall address: 8-1 Gonoue, Kokonoe-cho, Kusu-gun, Ōita-ken 879-4895
- Website: Official website
- Symbols
- Bird: Common cuckoo
- Flower: Rhododendron kiusianum
- Tree: Quercus acutissima

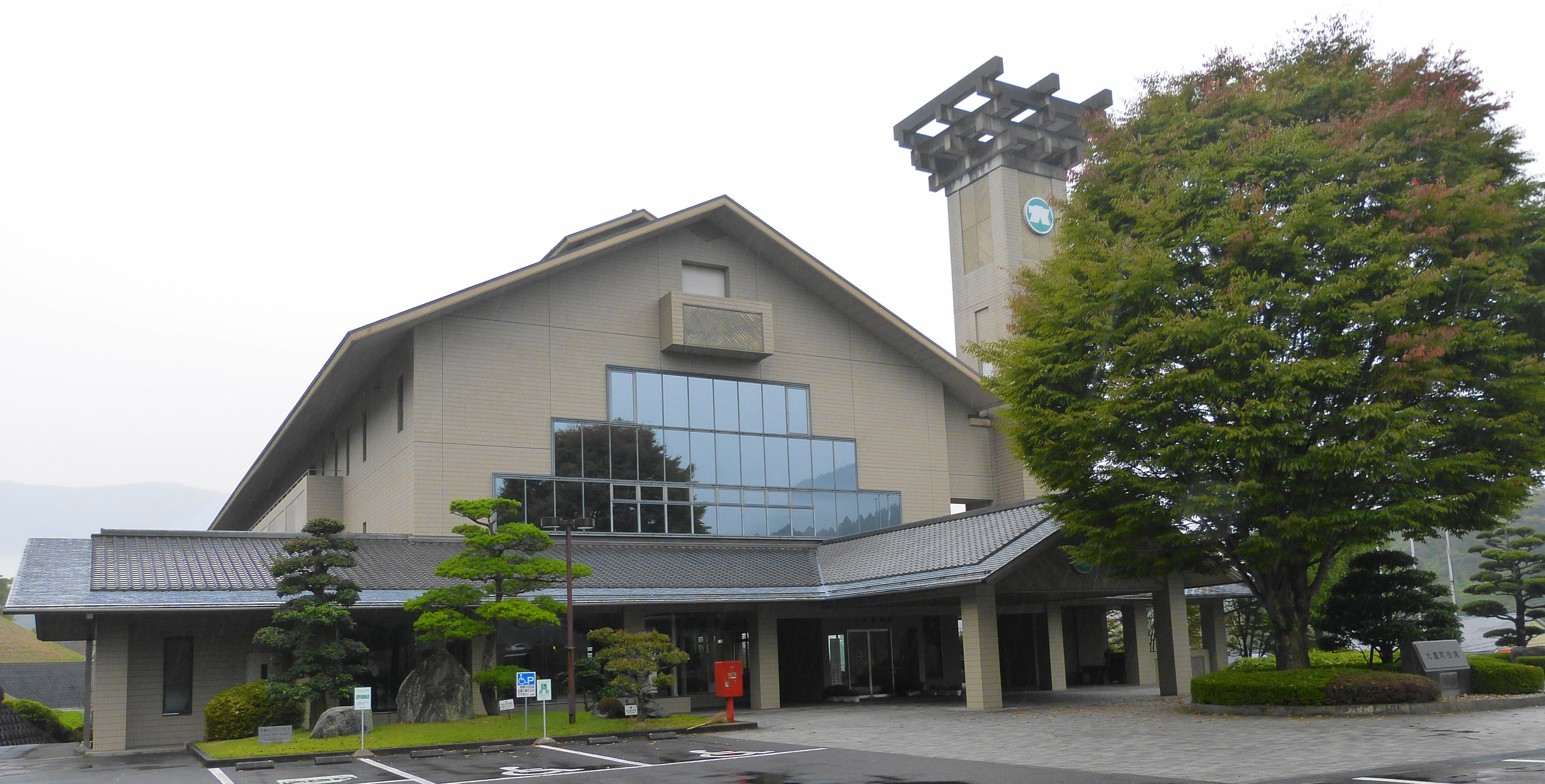
Kokonoe Town Hall

Kokonoe (九重町, Kokonoe-machi) is a town located in Kusu District, Ōita Prefecture, Japan. As of 30 November 2023, the town had an estimated population of 8,536 in 3,881 households, and a population density of 31 persons per km^{2}. The total area of the city is 271.37 km^{2} (104.78 sq mi).

== Geography ==
Kokonoe is located within the mountainous western part of Oita, with most of the area is covered within the Aso Kujū National Park. Mount Kujū is located here with the Kusu River flowing through Kokonoe.

=== Neighbouring municipalities ===
Kumamoto Prefecture

- Minamioguni
- Oguni

Ōita Prefecture

- Kusu
- Taketa
- Yufu

=== Climate ===
Kokonoe has a humid subtropical climate (Köppen Cfa) characterized by warm summers and cool winters with light to no snowfall. The average annual temperature in Kokonoe is 12.0 °C. The average annual rainfall is 1795 mm with September as the wettest month. The temperatures are highest on average in August, at around 23.0 °C, and lowest in January, at around 0.7 °C.

=== Demographics ===
Per Japanese census data, the population of Kokonoe is as shown below

Historical population
Year	Pop.	±%
1950	15,516	—
1960	20,538	+32.4%
1970	20,275	−1.3%
1980	16,324	−19.5%
1990	14,407	−11.7%
2000	12,848	−10.8%
2010	11,566	−10.0%
2020	10,425	−9.9%

== History ==
The area of Kokonoe was part of ancient Bungo Province. During the Edo period the area was mostly tenryō territory under the direct control of the Tokugawa shogunate. Following the Meiji restoration, the villages of Handa, Higashi-Handa and Minami-Yamada within Kusu District, Ōita were established on May 1, 1889, with the creation of the modern municipalities system. The village of Nogami was established on March 29, 1896, out of portions of Handa and Higashi-Handa, and was raised to town status on January 1, 1951. On February 1, 1955, the town of Nogami and villages of Handa, Higashi-Handa and Minami-Yamada merged to form the town of Kokonoe.

== Government ==
Kokonoe has a mayor-council form of government with a directly elected mayor and a unicameral town council of 13 members. Kokonoe, together with Kusu, contributes one member to the Ōita Prefectural Assembly. In terms of national politics, the town is part of the Ōita 2nd district of the lower house of the Diet of Japan.

== Economy ==
The economy of Kokonoe is centered on agriculture, forestry and electrical energy production. The town power plants, with geothermal power generating a large amount of electricity, and the electricity self-sufficiency rate reaches 2,293%, the highest among municipalities in Japan. The town promotes its nine onsen, which are occasionally closed due to flooding; it is also the summer headquarters of Labo Camp Kujū, part of the LABO language program.

== Education ==
Kokonoe has six public elementary schools and one public junior high school operated by the town government. The town does not have a high school.

== Transportation ==
=== Railways ===
JR Kyushu - Kyūdai Main Line

- Era - Hikiji - Bungo-Nakamura - Noya

=== Highways ===
- Ōita Expressway
- National Route 210
- National Route 387
- National Route 326
- National Route 388

== Gallery ==
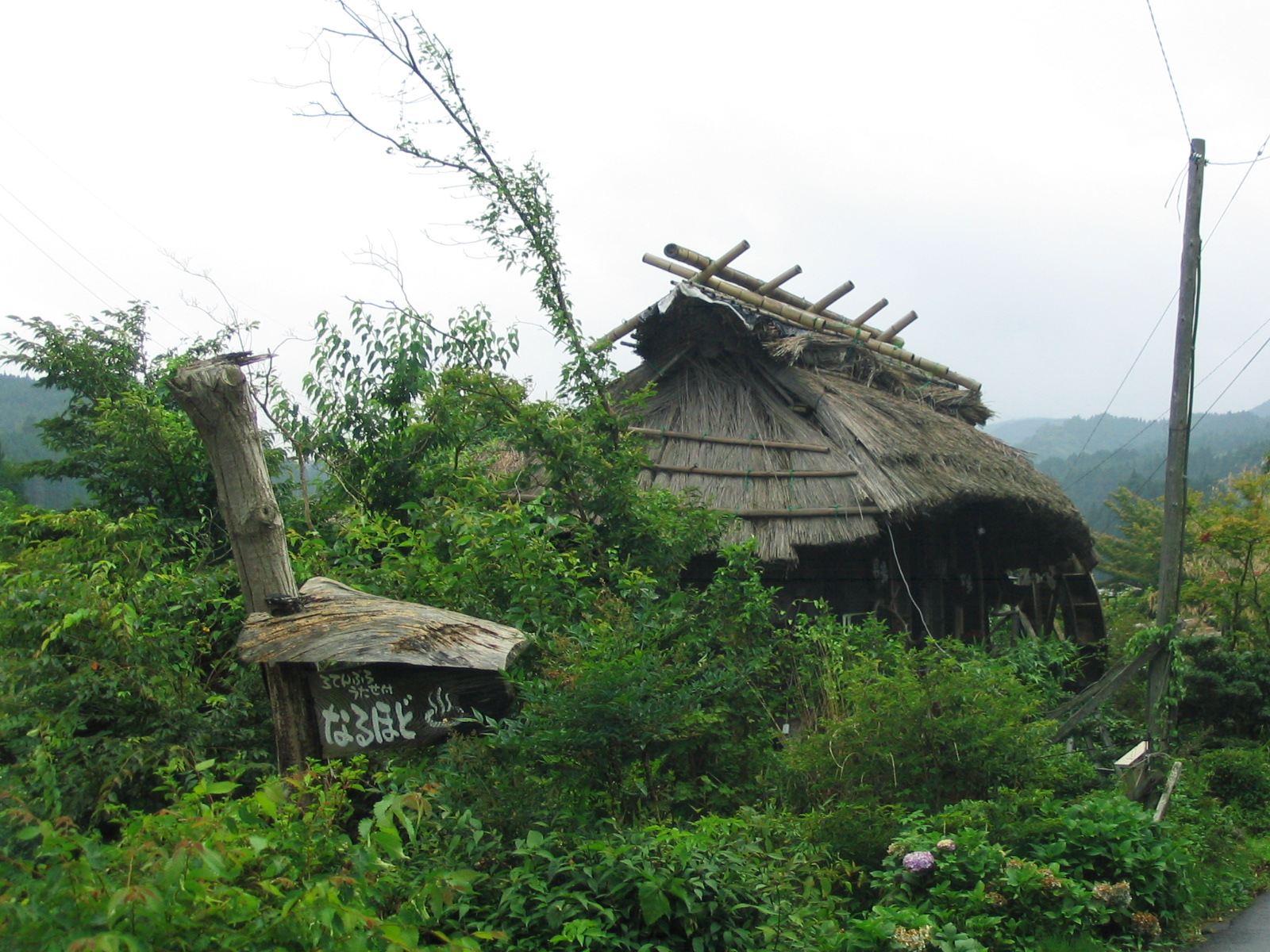
Naruhodo Hot Spring in Kokonoe, not one of the promoted nine

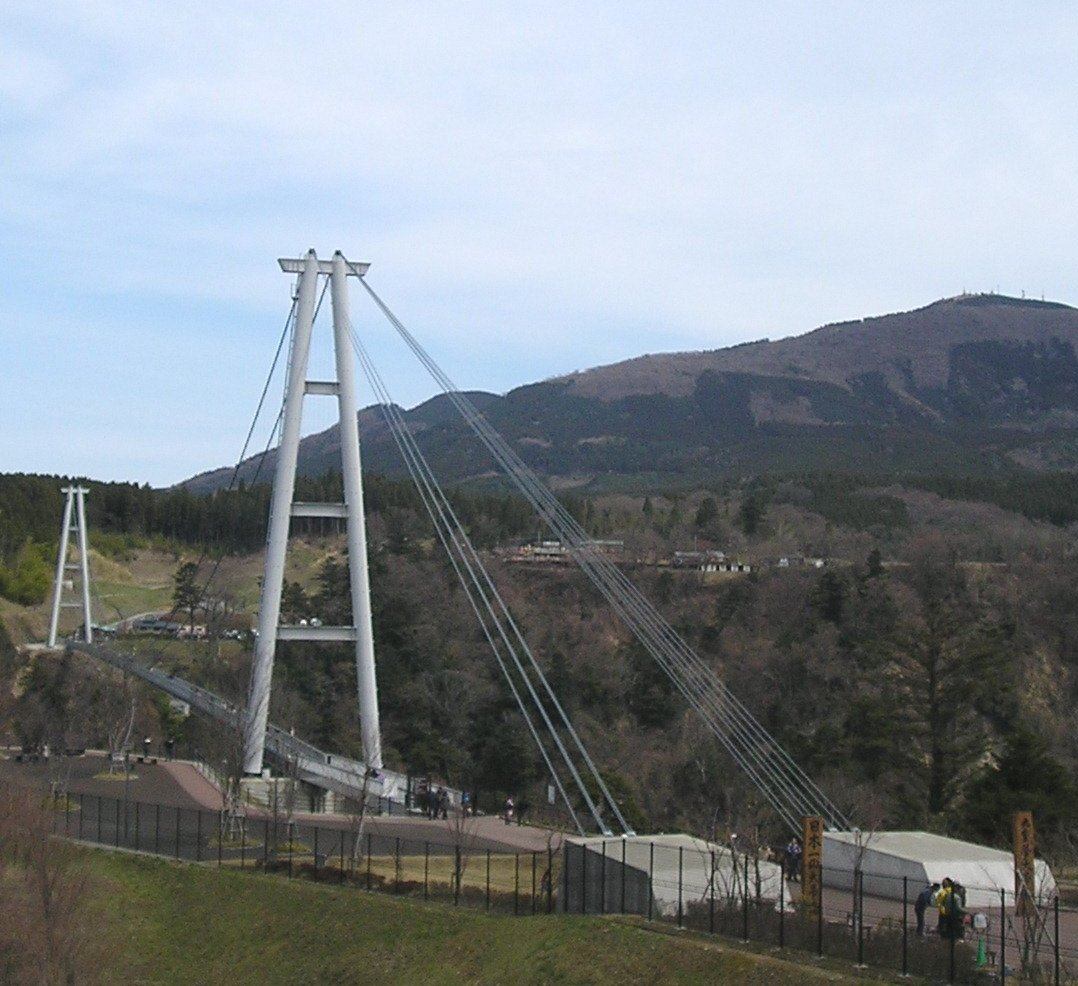
The Kokonoe Yume (Dream) Suspension Bridge
