= Oasis Hiroba 21 =

Skyscraper in Ōita, Japan

Coordinates: 33°14′17″N 131°36′06″E

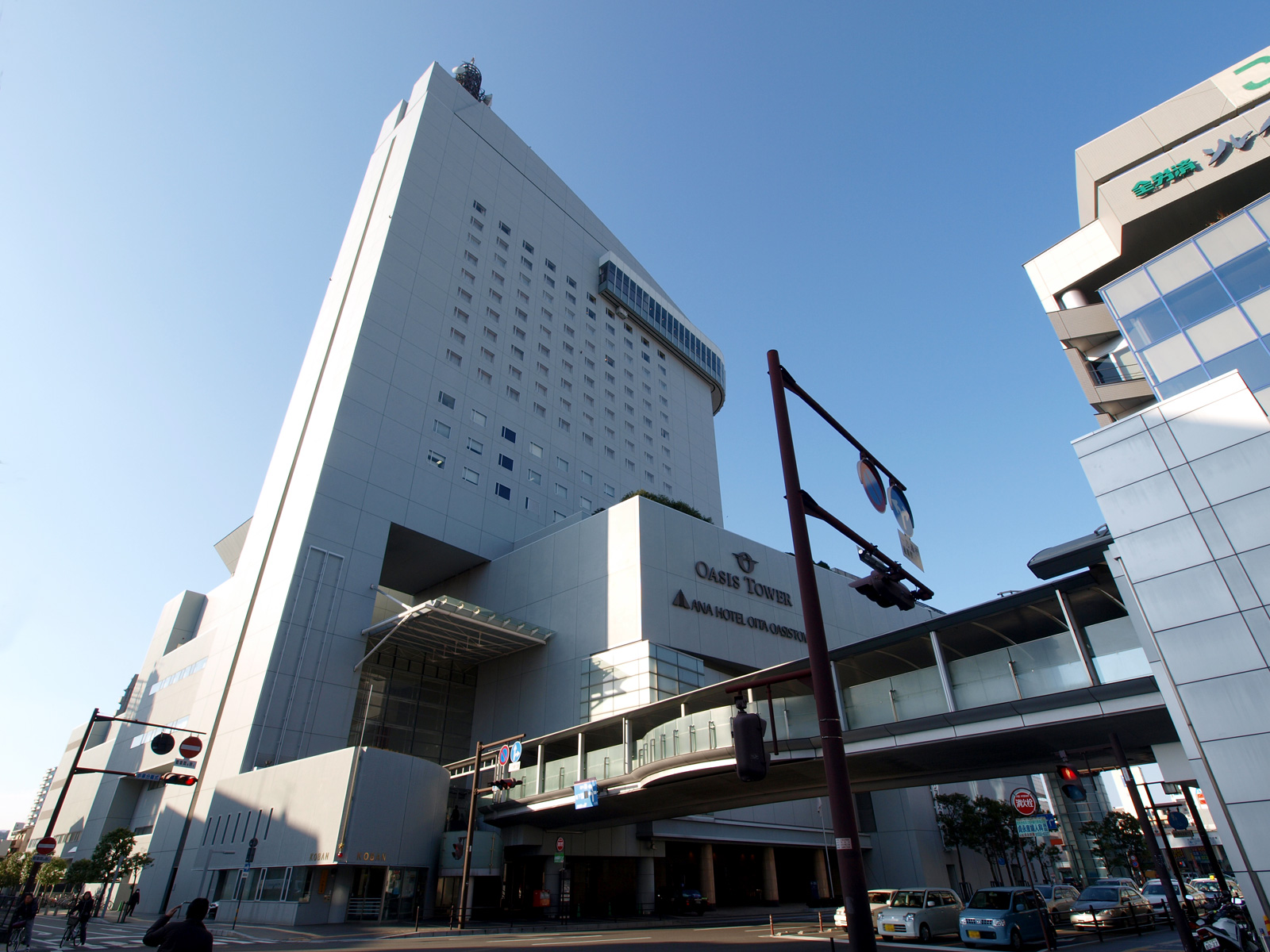
Oasis Hiroba 21

The Oasis Hiroba 21 (OASISひろば21) is a skyscraper located in Ōita, Ōita Prefecture, Japan. Construction of the 102-metre, 21-storey skyscraper was finished in 1998.
