= Hita Station =

Railway station in Hita, Ōita Prefecture, Japan

Hita Station 日田駅
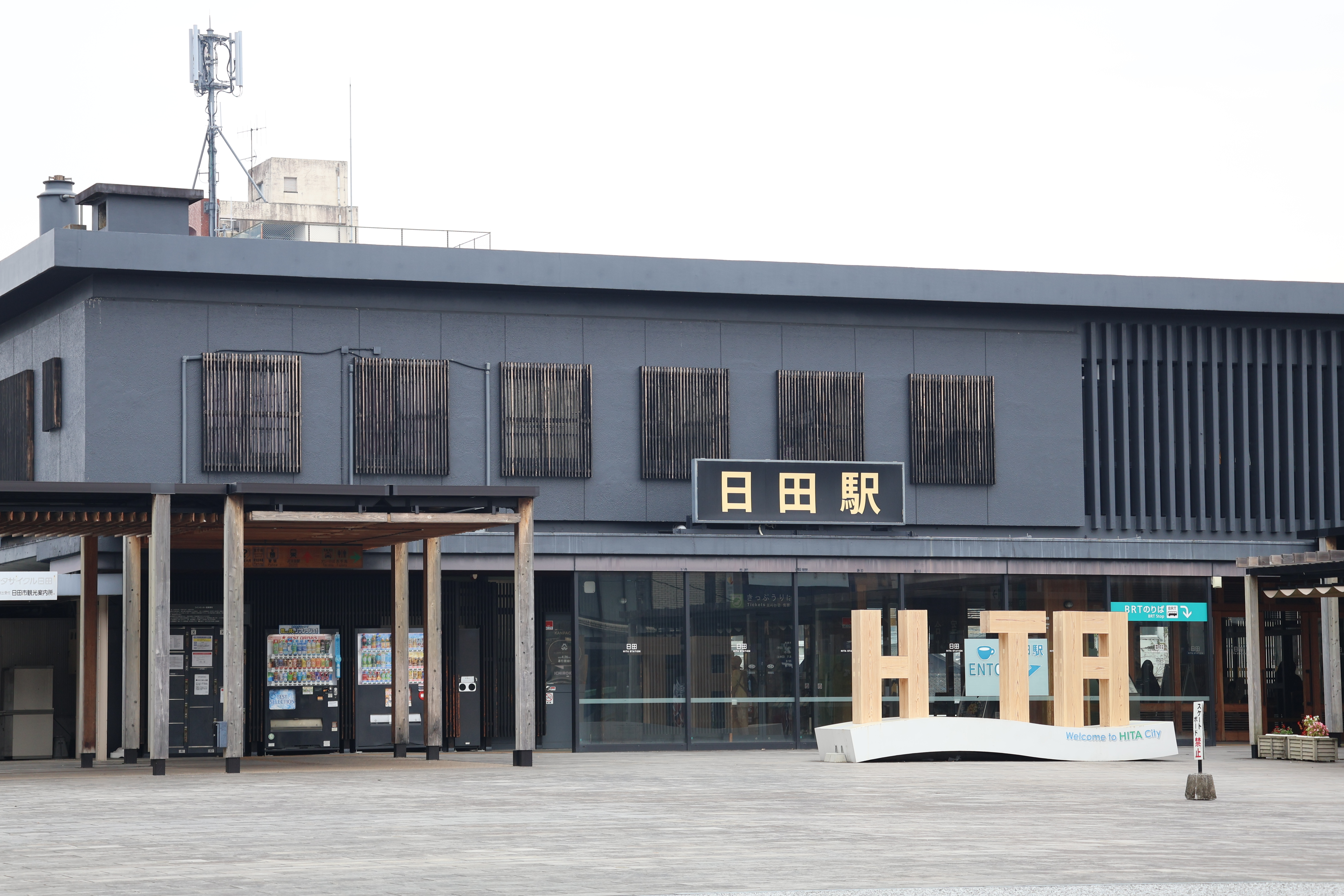
- Station building, 2024

General information
- Location: 11-1 Motomachi, Hita-shi, Ōita-ken 877-0013; Japan
- Coordinates: 33°19′01″N 130°56′19″E
- Operator: JR Kyushu
- Lines: ■ Kyūdai Main Line ■ Hitahikosan Line (BRT)
- Distance: 47.6 km from Kurume
- Platforms: 2 side platforms
- Tracks: 3

Construction
- Structure type: At grade

Other information
- Status: Staffed (Midori no Madoguchi)
- Website: Official website

History
- Opened: 3 March 1934

Passengers
- FY2018: 640 daily

Services
| Preceding station | JR Kyushu | Following station |
|---|---|---|
| Teruoka towards Kurume | Kyūdai Main Line | Bungo-Miyoshi towards Ōita |
Location
- Location within Oita Prefecture Location within Japan

Hita Station (日田駅, Hita-eki) is a railway station on the Kyūdai Main Line operated by JR Kyushu in Hita, Ōita Prefecture, Japan.

== Lines ==
The station is served by the Kyūdai Main Line and is located 47.6 km from the starting point of the line at Kurume. It was also the terminus of the 68.7 kilometer Hitahikosan Line until that line was closed in 2017 and replaced by a BRT.

== Layout ==
The station consists of a side platform and an island platform connected to the reinforced concrete station building by an underground passage. There are also three siding tracks.The station has a Midori no Madoguchi staffed ticket office. The ticket gate is only at the south exit (southwest side) of the station, but there is an underground free passage (different from the underground passage to the platform) adjacent to the station building that connects the south exit and the northeast side.The Hitahikosan Line BRT departs from and arrives at the boarding area located at the rotary in front of the station (south exit).

=== Platforms ===
| 1, 2, 3 | ■ ■ Kyūdai Main Line | for Kurume and Hakata |
| 2, 3 | ■ ■ Kyūdai Main Line | for Bungo-Mori, Yufuin and Ōita |

== History ==
In 1915, the Daito Railway Co. opened the 22 km Oita - Onoya section. The company was nationalised in 1922, and westerly extensions were undertaken in stages from 1923 until Amagase was reached in 1933. The section between Kurume and Chikugoyoshi was opened in 1928, and easterly extensions to Amagase opened between 1931 and 1934. With the privatization of Japanese National Railways (JNR), the successor of JGR, on 1 April 1987, the station came under the control of JR Kyushu.

- 3 March 1934- Kyūdai Line (Kitayamada Station to Hita Station) opened. The station opened along with the line.
- 15 November 1934 - Kyūdai Line was extended from this station to Amagase station.
- 27 June 1937 - Kyūdai Line renamed as Kyūdai Main Line.
- 1972 -Reconstruction of station building.。
- 1984 - reconstruction of surround area and the square in front of the station.
- 1987
  - 5 February - green window opened.
  - 1 April - JNR division and privatization. The station is inherited by Kyushu Railway Company.
- 28 March 2015- station building renovated.
- 2017
  - 5 July - The bridge over the Oita River between Chikugo Oisha and Teruoka was demolished by heavy rain. Sections between Hita Station and Ukiha Station on Kyūdai Main Line and between Hita Station and Soeda Station on Hitahikosan Line were closed.
  - 18 July 2017 - service between Ukiha and Mitsuoka Stations resumed. The service between Mitsuoka Station and Hita Station was connected by shuttle bus.
- 14 July 2018 - section between Mitsuoka Station and Hita Station reopened.

== Passenger statistics ==
In fiscal 2016, the station was used by an average of 783 passengers daily (boarding passengers only), and it ranked 193rd among the busiest stations of JR Kyushu.

== Surrounding area ==
- Hita City Hall
- Kage High School
- Oita Prefectural Hita High School

== See also ==
- List of railway stations in Japan
