= Ōita Station =

Railway station in Ōita, Ōita Prefecture, Japan

Ōita Station 大分駅
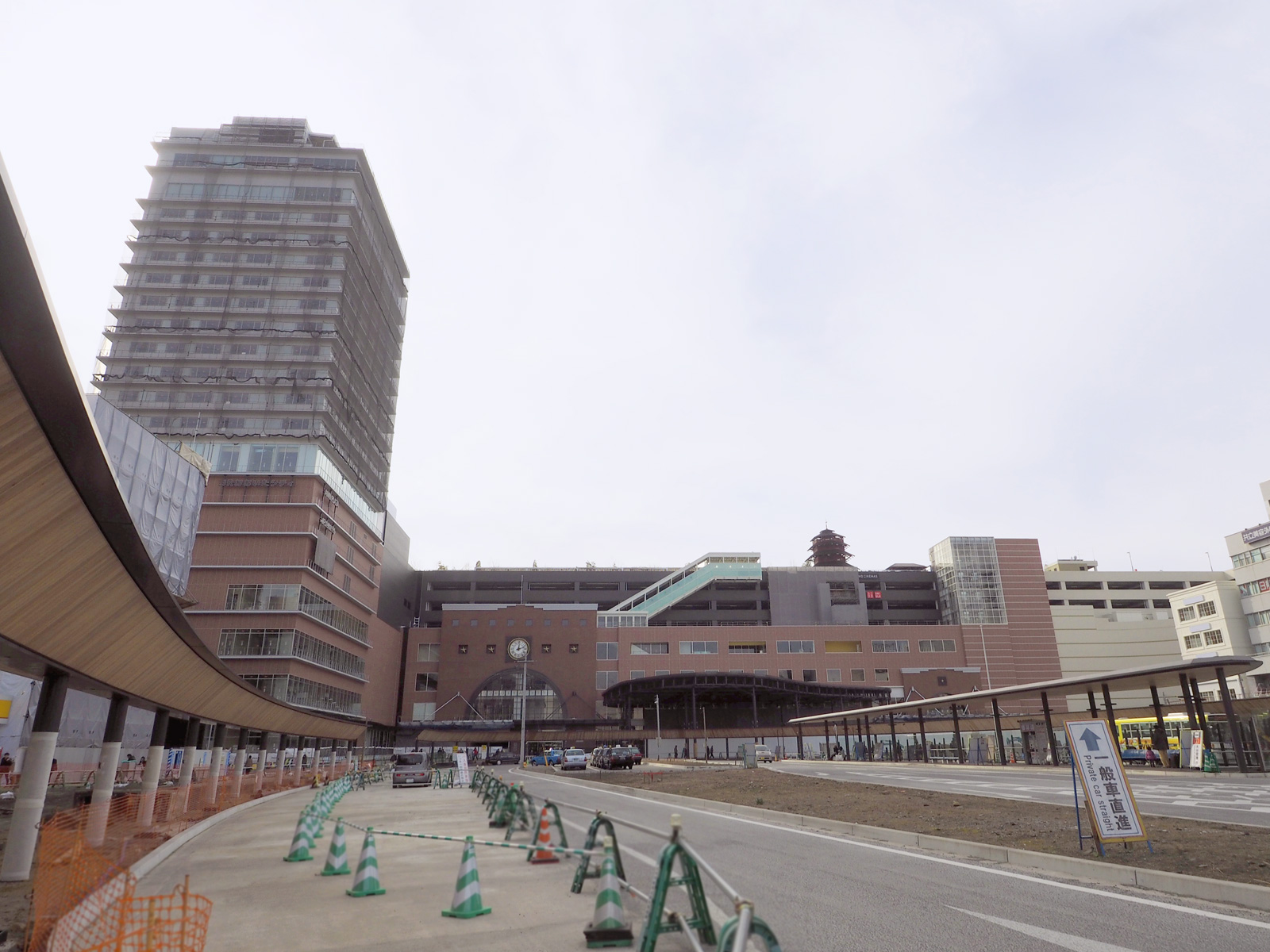
- Ōita Station in January 2015

General information
- Location: 1-1 Kanamemachi, Ōita-shi, Ōita-ken; Japan
- Coordinates: 33.23264°N 131.606705°E
- Operator: JR Kyushu
- Lines: Nippō Main Line; Kyūdai Main Line; Hōhi Main Line
- Platforms: 4 island platforms
- Tracks: 8

Construction
- Structure type: Elevated

History
- Opened: 1 November 1911; 114 years ago

Passengers
- FY2021: 13,724 daily (boarding only)
- Rank: 4th (among JR Kyushu stations)

Services
Preceding station	JR Kyushu	Following station
Maki towards Kagoshima	Nippō Main Line	Nishi-Ōita towards Kokura
Furugō towards Kurume	Kyūdai Main Line	Terminus
Takio towards Kumamoto	Hōhi Main Line	Terminus
Location
- Location within Oita Prefecture Location within Japan

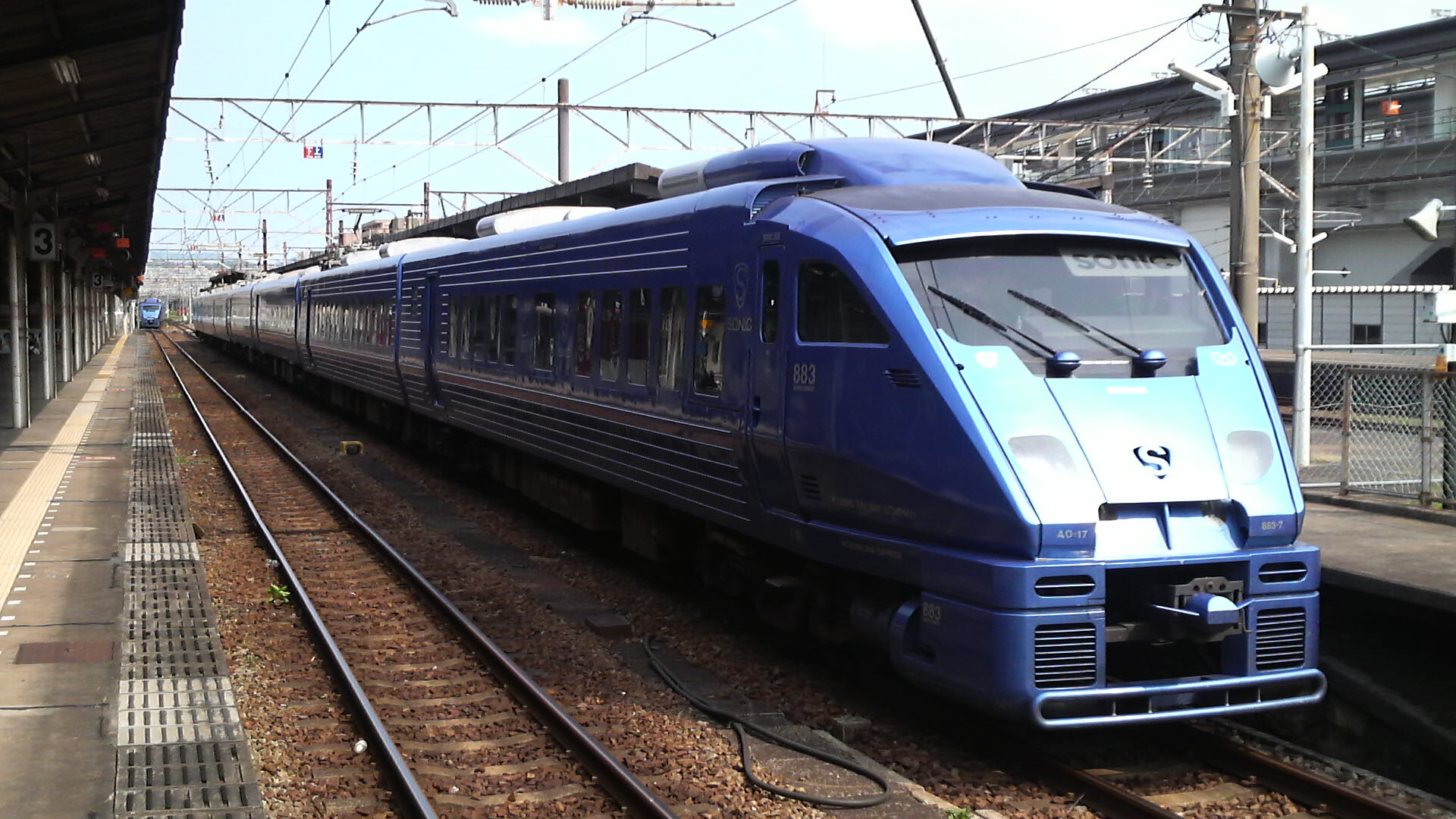
A 883 series at Ōita Station in July 2008

Ōita Station (大分駅, Ōita-eki) is a junction passenger railway station located in Ōita City, Ōita Prefecture, Japan. It is operated by JR Kyushu.

== Lines ==
The station is served by three lines. On the Nippō Main Line it is located 132.9 km from the starting point of the line at Kokura and on the Kyūdai Main Line it is located 141.5 km from the starting point of that line at Kurume. It is also the eastern terminus of 148.0 km Hōhi Main Line from Kumamoto.

== Layout ==
The station consists of four elevated island platforms serving eight tracks. The station building is located underneath the platforms. The ticket gate is located on the west side near the center of the concourse. An automatic ticket gate has been installed, and it has also been compatible with SUGOCA. The station has a Midori no Madoguchi staffed ticket office.

=== Platforms ===
There are four side platforms and eight island platforms.

1	Nippō Main Line (Limited express)	for Kokura, Hakata and Saiki
1	Nippō Main Line (Local trains)	for Tsurusaki and Saiki
2	Nippō Main Line (Limited express)	for Saiki and Miyazaki
2	Nippō Main Line (Local trains)	for Tsurusaki and Saiki
3	Nippō Main Line (Limited express)	for Kokura and Hakata
3	Nippō Main Line (Local trains)	for Beppu and Nakatsu
4 • 5	Nippō Main Line	for Beppu and Nakatsu
4 • 5	Nippō Main Line	for Saiki and Miyazaki
4 • 5	Hōhi Main Line (Local trains)	for Aso and Kumamoto
6 • 7 • 8	Hōhi Main Line	for Aso and Kumamoto
6 • 7 • 8	Kyūdai Main Line	for Yufuin and Kurume

=== Limited Express Trains ===
- Sonic (Hakata - Ōita)
- Nichirin (Hakata - Miyazaki)
- Yufuin-no-mori, Yufu (Hakata - Beppu)
- Trans-Kyushu Limited Express (Beppu - Hitoyoshi)

== History ==
Japanese Government Railways (JGR) opened the station on 1 November 1911 as the southern terminus of its then Hōshū Main Line (豊州本線) which it had been extending southwards in phases since 1907 when it had acquired the former Kyushu Railway's private track from Kokura south to Usa. Ōita became a through-station on 1 April 1914 when the track was extended further south to Kōzaki. On 15 December 1923, this entire stretch of track was redesignated as the Nippo Main Line.

Separately, on 1 April 1914, JGR opened the Inukai Light Rail Line (犬飼軽便線) from Ōita westwards to Nakahanda. This track later linked up with another built eastwards from Kumamoto and the entire stretch was designated as the Hōhi Main Line on 2 December 1928.

The origin of the third line to serve the station, the Kyudai Main Line lay with the private Daito Railway (大湯鉄道) which opened a track from Ōita westwards to Onoya on 30 October 1915. On 1 December 1922, the Daito Railway was nationalized and JGR designated this stretch of track as the Daito Line. By 1934, the track had linked up with a track built eastwards from Kurume and the entire route was designated the Kyudai Main Line.

With the privatization of Japanese National Railways (JNR), the successor of JGR, on 1 April 1987, Ōita came under the control of JR Kyushu.

== Passenger statistics ==
In fiscal 2016, the station was used by an average of 19,165 passengers daily (boarding passengers only), and it ranked 4th among the busiest stations of JR Kyushu.

== In popular culture ==
The JR Ōita City station complex was the main subject of an episode in the NHK World English documentary series Japan Railway Journal titled JR Ōita City: The Station Complex that Changed the Game, first broadcast on 15 February 2018. The episode describes how the station complex, which opened in 2015, contributed to increased ridership at the station and also to the economic revitalization of the surrounding area. The same episode also covered the Bungo-Mori Roundhouse Park, located near Bungo-Mori Station.

== Surrounding area ==
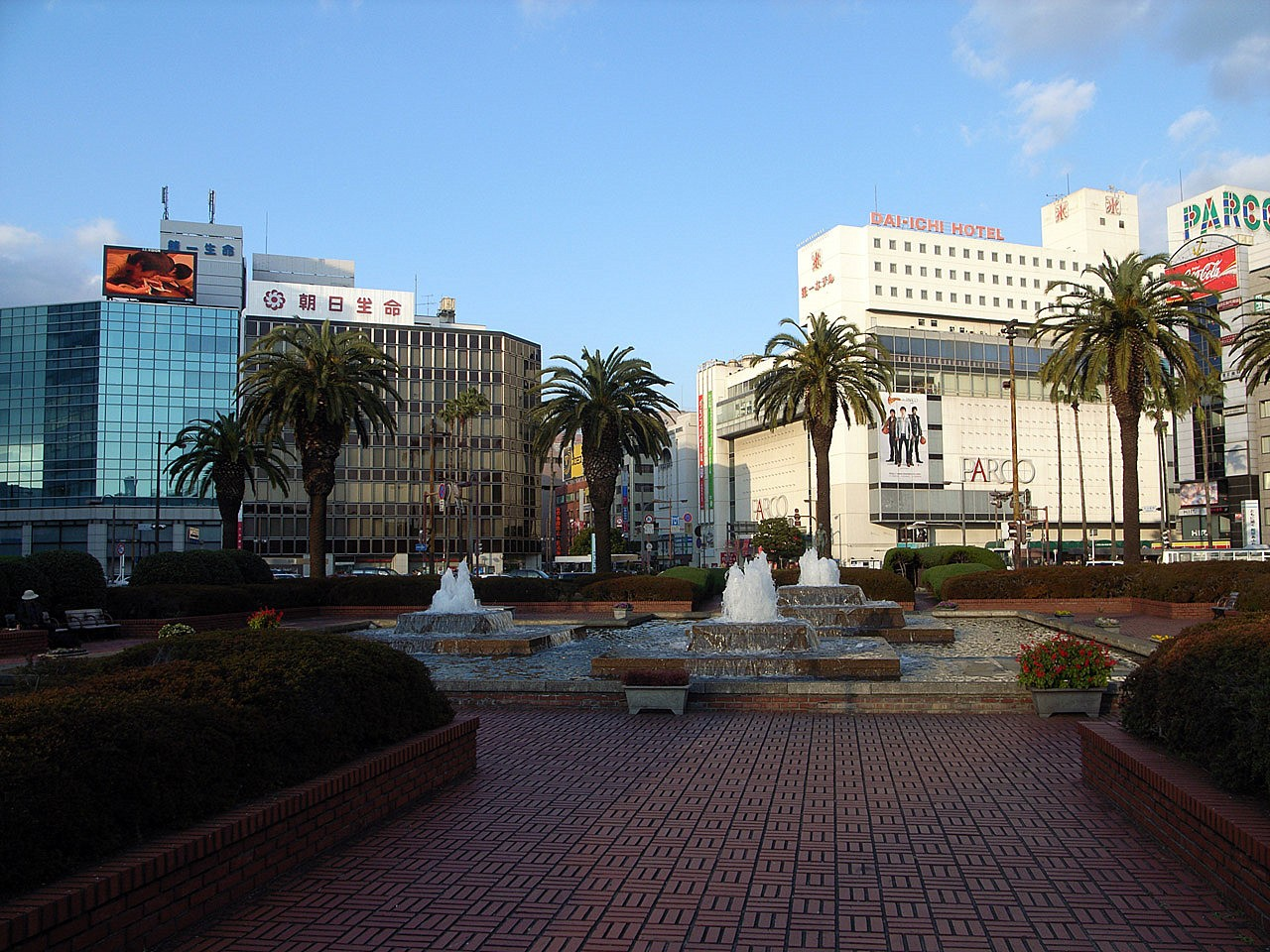
View from the station

- North Entrance
  - Oita Prefectural Government Office
  - Oita City Hall
  - Oasis Hiroba 21 and Oita ANA Hotel OASIS Tower
  - Funai Castle
  - Building of Red Brick (Oita Bank)
  - Oita Chūō Post Office
  - Oita Parco and Oita Daiichi Hotel
  - Tokiwa Department Store
  - Chūōcho Centporta
  - Galleria Takemachi
  - Funai 5 Bangai
  - Oita Washington Hotel Plaza
  - Hotel Hokke Club Oita
  - National Route 10
  - National Route 197 (Chūō-dori main street)
  - Oita Station Bus Terminal
- South Entrance
  - Oita City Museum of Fine Art
  - National Route 210
  - Oita Toyo Hotel
