= Kurume Station =

Railway station in Fukuoka Prefecture, Japan

JB 17 Kurume Station 久留米駅
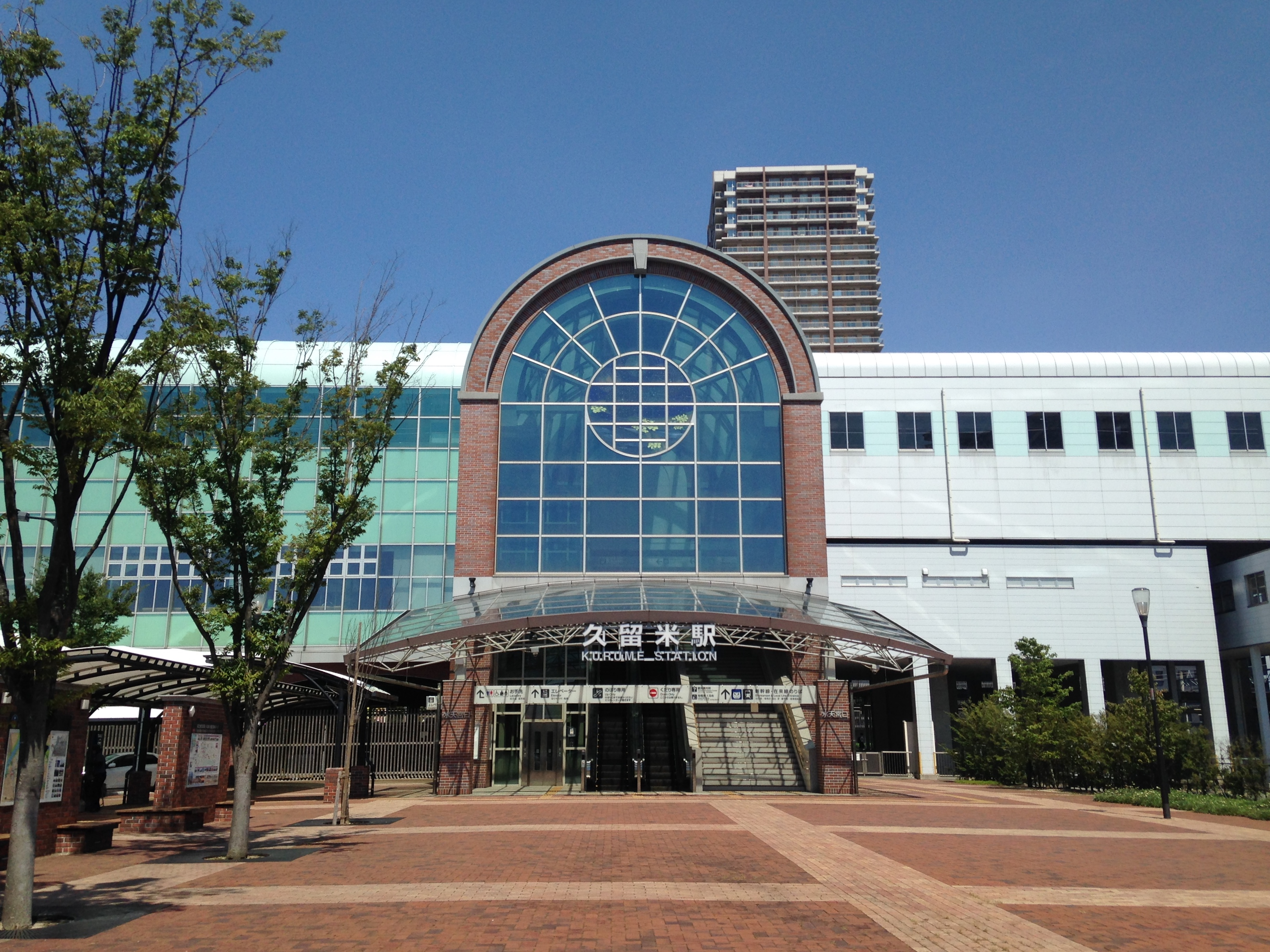
- Kurume Station in July 2016

General information
- Location: 186 Kyōmachi, Kurume-shi, Fukuoka-ken 830-0022; Japan
- Coordinates: 33°19′12″N 130°30′05″E
- Operator: JR Kyushu
- Lines: Kyūshū Shinkansen; JB Kagoshima Main Line; Kyūdai Main Line
- Distance: 113.9 km (70.8 mi) from Mojikō (Kagoshima Main Line); 0.0 km (starting point of the Kyūdai Main Line); 32.0 km (19.9 mi) from Hakata (Kyushu Shinkansen)
- Platforms: 2 side platforms (Shinkansen); 2 island platforms and 1 side platform (Conventional lines)
- Tracks: 7 (2 Shinkansen, 5 conventional line)

Construction
- Structure type: At grade (Shinkansen lines elevated)

Other information
- Status: Staffed ticket window (Midori no Madoguchi)
- Website: Official website

History
- Opened: 1 March 1890; 136 years ago

Passengers
- FY2020: 5430 daily
- Rank: 22nd (among JR Kyushu stations)

Services
Preceding station	JR Kyushu	Following station
Shinkansen
Kumamoto towards Kagoshima-Chūō	Kyūshū Shinkansen Mizuho	Hakata Terminus
Chikugo-Funagoya towards Kagoshima-Chūō	Kyūshū Shinkansen Sakura Tsubame	Shin-Tosu towards Hakata
Local
Hizen-Asahi JB 16 towards Kagoshima	Kagoshima Main Line Local	Araki JB 18 towards Mojikō
Tosu JB 15 towards Kagoshima	Kagoshima Main Line Rapid	Araki JB 18 towards Mojikō
Terminus	Kyūdai Main Line	Kurume-Kōkōmae towards Ōita
Location
- Location within Fukuoka Prefecture Location within Kyushu Location within Japan

Kurume Station (久留米駅, Kurume-eki) is a junction passenger railway station located in the city of Kurume, Fukuoka, Japan. It is operated by JR Kyushu.

== Lines ==
Kurume Station is served by the Kyushu Shinkansen and is 35.7 kilometers from Hakata and 658.0 kilometers from Shin-Osaka. With regards to regular train services, it is served by the Kagoshima Main Line, for which it is 113.9 kilometers from the terminus of the line at Mojikō. It is also the western terminus of the 141.5 kilometer Kyūdai Main Line to Ōita.

== Layout ==
The Shinkansen portion of the station consists of two facing side platforms and two tracks located on the third floor of the station building. There are no passing tracks, and platform safety gates are installed for safety. The conventional line station consists of two island platforms with four tracks and one cutout platform with one track, for a total of three platforms and five tracks. There is also a siding track. The east side (station building side) platform has numbers 1 and 3, and the cutout platform number 2. Platforms 4 and 5 are located on the west side of the platform. The station has a Midori no Madoguchi staffed ticket office.

== Platforms ==
1	Kagoshima Main Line	for Hainuzuka, Setaka, and Ōmuta
1	Kyūdai Main Line	for Chikugo-Yoshii, and Hita
2	Kyūdai Main Line	for Chikugo-Yoshii and Hita
3	■ Limited Express Ariake	for Kumamoto
3	■ Limited Express Yufu, Yufu DX, Yufuin-no-Mori	for Hita, Yufuin, and Oita
3	Kagoshima Main Line	for Hainuzuka, Setaka, and Ōmuta
4	■ Limited Express Ariake	for Hakata
4	■ Limited Express Yufu, Yufu DX, Yufuin-no-Mori	for Hakata
4	Kagoshima Main Line	for Tosu, Hakata, Kokura and Mojikō
5	Kagoshima Main Line	for Tosu, Hakata, Kokura, and Mojikō
11	Kyushu Shinkansen	for Hakata and Shin-Ōsaka
12	Kyushu Shinkansen	for Kumamoto and Kagoshima-Chūō

== History ==
By December 1889, the privately run Kyushu Railway had opened a stretch of track from Hakata to the (now closed) Chitosegawa temporary stop. In the next phase of expansion, the track was extended southwards to Kurume, which opened as the new southern terminus on 1 March 1890. Kurume became a through-station on 1 April 1891 when the track was further extended to Setaka. When the Kyushu Railway was nationalized on 1 July 1907, Japanese Government Railways (JGR) took over control of the station. On 12 October 1909, the station became part of the Hitoyoshi and Nagasaki Main Lines. On 21 November 1909, the Hitoyoshi Main Line was renamed the Kagoshima Main Line. With the privatization of Japanese National Railways (JNR), the successor of JGR, on 1 April 1987, JR Kyushu took over control of the station.

== Passenger statistics ==
In fiscal 2020, the station was used by 5430 passengers daily (boarding passengers only), and it ranked 22nd among the busiest stations of JR Kyushu.

== Surrounding area ==
- Kurume City Hall
- Kurume University School of Medicine/University Hospital
- Fukuoka Prefectural Meizen High School

== See also ==
- List of railway stations in Japan
