= List of mergers in Ōita Prefecture =

Here is a list of mergers in Ōita Prefecture, Japan, since the Heisei era.

== Mergers from April 1, 1999 to2 006 ==
- On January 1, 2005 - the town of Notsu (from Ōno District) was merged into the expanded city of Usuki.
- On January 1, 2005 - the town of Notsuharu (from Ōita District) and the town of Saganoseki (from Kitaamabe District) were merged into the expanded city of Ōita. Kitaamabe District was dissolved as a result of this merger.
- On March 1, 2005 - the towns of Hon'yabakei, Yabakei and Yamakuni, and the village of Sankō (all from Shimoge District) were merged into the expanded city of Nakatsu. Shimoge District was dissolved as a result of this merger.
- On March 3, 2005 - the old city of Saiki absorbed the towns of Kamae, Kamiura, Tsurumi, Ume and Yayoi, and the villages of Honjō, Naokawa and Yonōzu (all from Minamiamabe District) to create the new and expanded city of Saiki. Minamiamabe District was dissolved as a result of this merger.
- On March 22, 2005 - the towns of Amagase and Ōyama, and the villages of Kamitsue, Maetsue and Nakatsue (all from Hita District) were merged into the expanded city of Hita. Hita District was dissolved as a result of this merger.
- On March 31, 2005 - the towns of Asaji, Inukai, Mie, Ogata and Ōno, and the villages of Chitose and Kiyokawa (all from Ōno District) were merged to create the city of Bungo-Ōno. Ōno District was dissolved as a result of this merger.
- On March 31, 2005 - the old city of Usa absorbed the towns of Ajimu and Innai (both from Usa District) to create the new and expanded city of Usa. Usa District was dissolved as a result of this merger.
- On March 31, 2005 - the old city of Bungotakada absorbed the towns of Kakaji and Matama (both from Nishikunisaki District) to create the new and expanded city of Bungotakada.
- On April 1, 2005 - the old city of Taketa absorbed the towns of Kujū, Naoiri and Ogi (all from Naoiri District) to create the new and expanded city of Taketa. Naoiri District was dissolved as a result of this merger.
- On October 1, 2005 - Despite further opposition, the towns of Hasama, Shōnai and Yufuin (all from Ōita District) were merged to create the city of Yufu. Ōita District was dissolved as a result of this merger.
- On October 1, 2005 - the old city of Kitsuki absorbed the village of Ōta (from Nishikunisaki District), and the town of Yamaga (from Hayami District) to create the new and expanded city of Kitsuki. Nishikunisaki District was dissolved as a result of this merger.
- On March 31, 2006 - the former town of Kunisaki absorbed the towns of Aki, Kunimi and Musashi (all from Higashikunisaki District) to create the city of Kunisaki.
