= Yufuin Onsen =

Spa town in Ōita Prefecture, Japan

Coordinates: 33.263247°N 131.356332°E

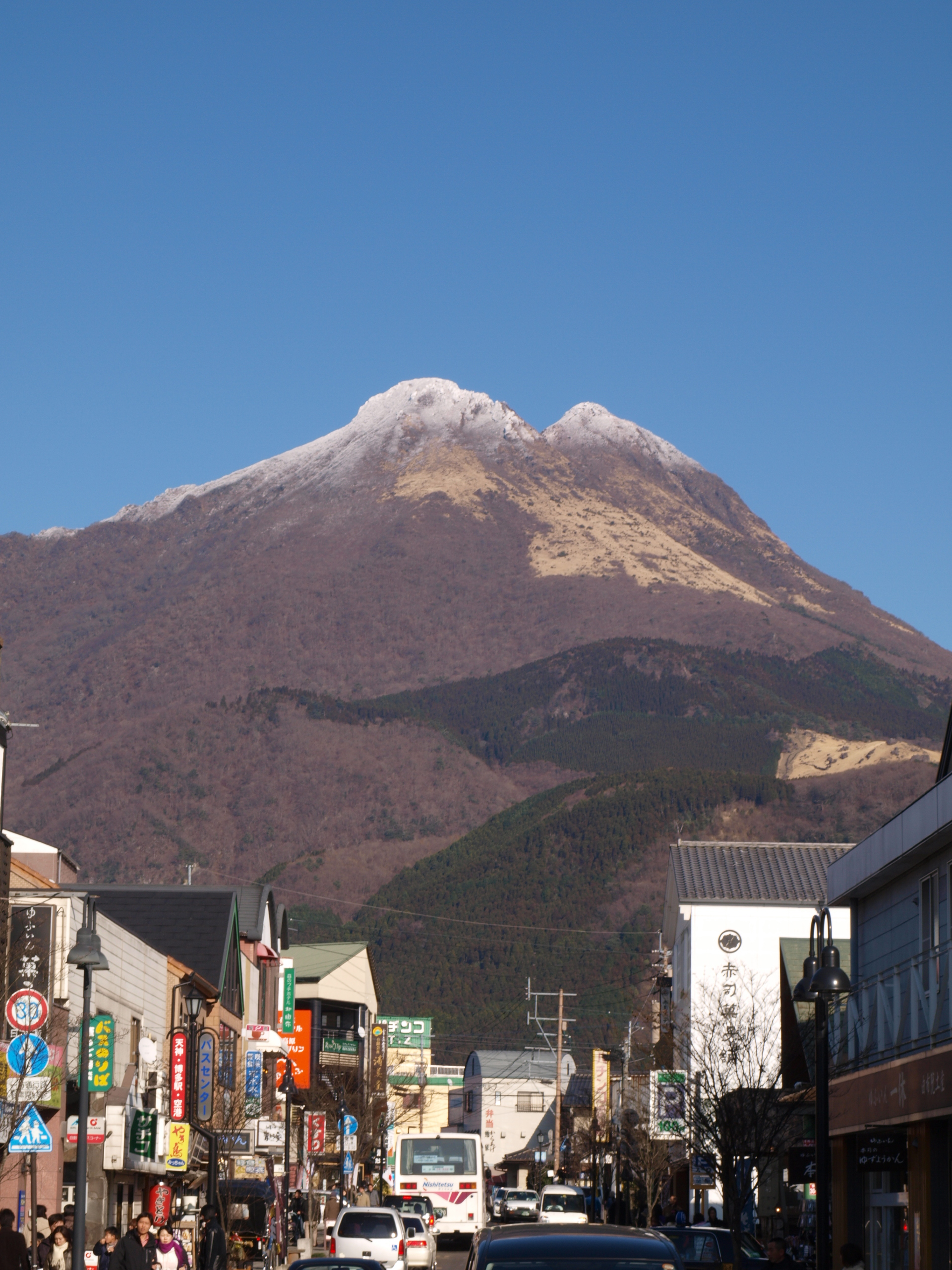
Mount Yufu (由布岳, Yufudake) is the representative sight of Yufuin

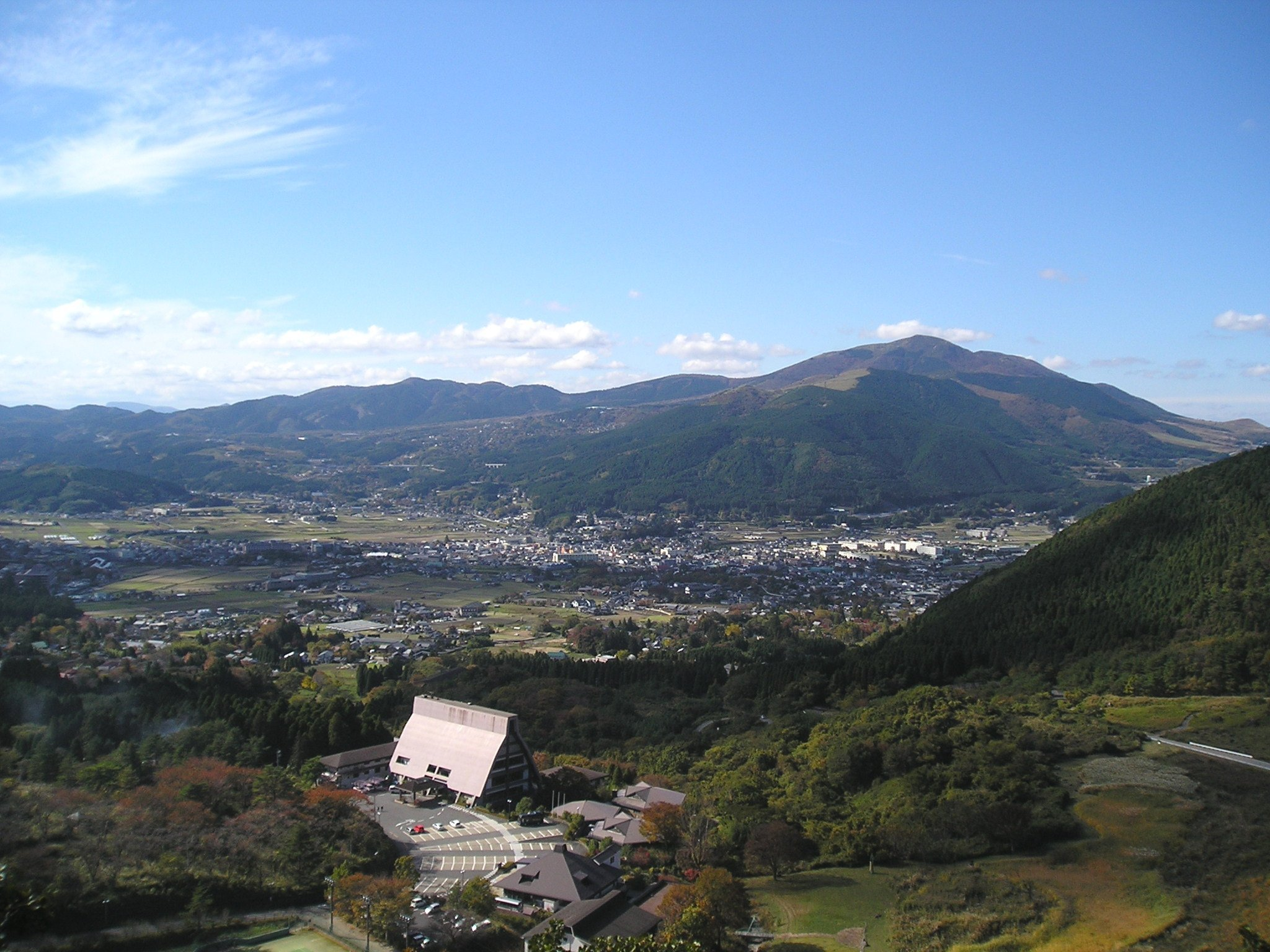
Yufuin panorama

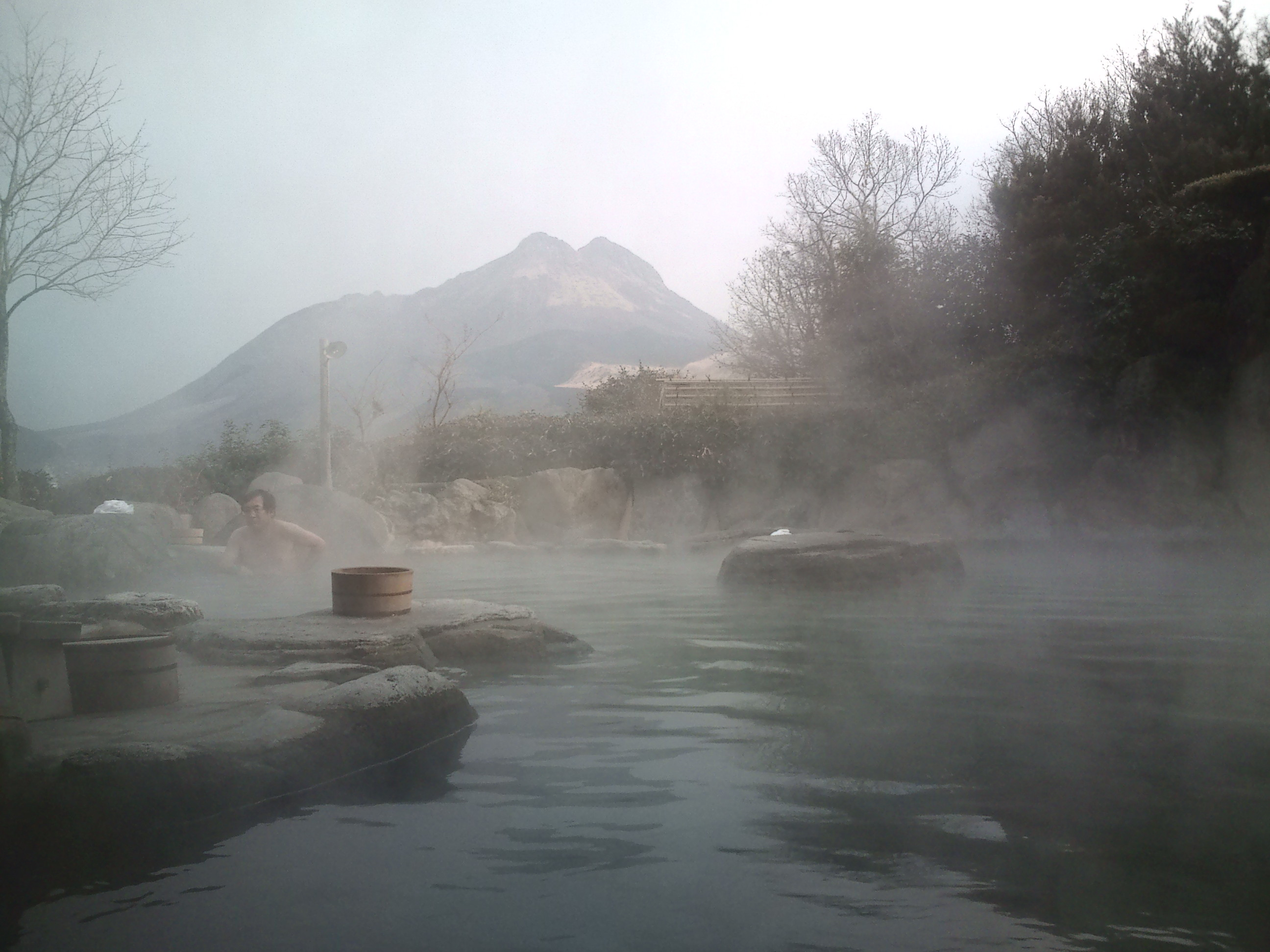
Onsen rotenburo (outdoor bath) with a view of Mount Yufu. Onsens are popular among locals and tourists alike

Yufuin Onsen (由布院温泉, Yufuin Onsen) is an extensive hot spring system in the city of Yufu, Ōita Prefecture, Japan.

Yufuin is famous for natural hot springs (温泉, onsen), resulting in a local economy based on domestic tourism, gift shops and hot-spring bathing. Some onsen are available to day tourists, but many are strictly for overnight guests. There are also sentō, which are the traditional public baths used by locals. Some of these, soaplands, can be used by tourists, while the others are for use by local residents only.

Located in a green valley beneath the spectacular Mount Yufu (由布岳, Yufudake), a short walk from the town centre is a mix of paddy fields, housing and upmarket ryokan, with a few temples. Mount Yufu, or Yufu-dake, can be hiked in about 90 minutes. Although still connected to its rural roots, Yufuin is a tourist town and a popular destination for coach tours, especially among South Korean, Chinese, Thai, and Taiwanese tourists. There is the picturesque Lake Kinrin and rivers flow down and across the valley. Some hotels have outdoor baths called rotenburo with a view of Mount Yufu.

== Sightseeing ==
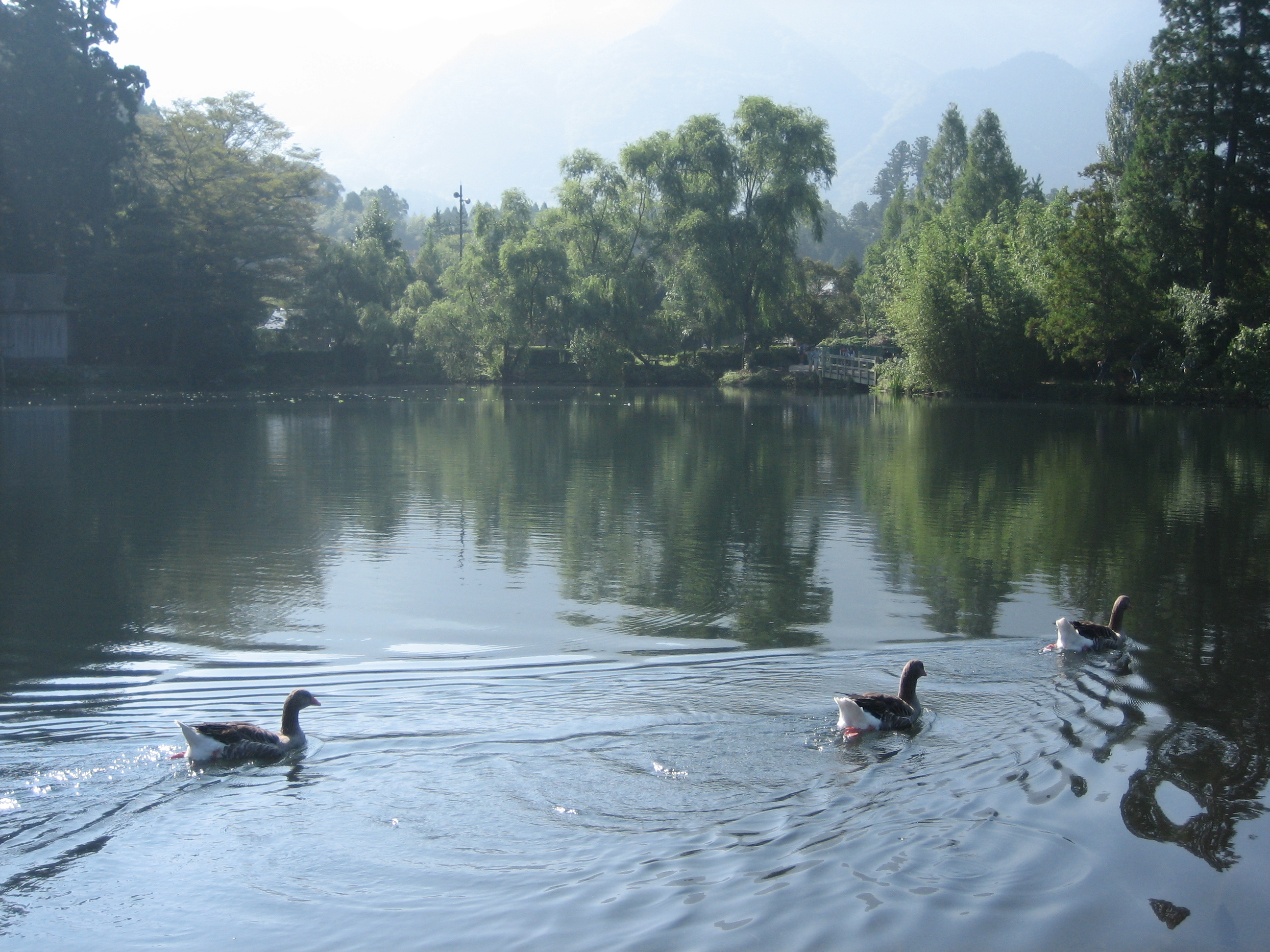
Kinrin-ko (金鱗湖; lit. 'Golden Scale Lake') is a tourist attraction in Yufuin

The two-peaked Mount Yufu and Lake Kinrin (金鱗湖, kinrin-ko) are commonly viewed and photographed by tourists. Lake Kinrin is known for its fall leaves and the steam that rises from the lake's surface on cold mornings.

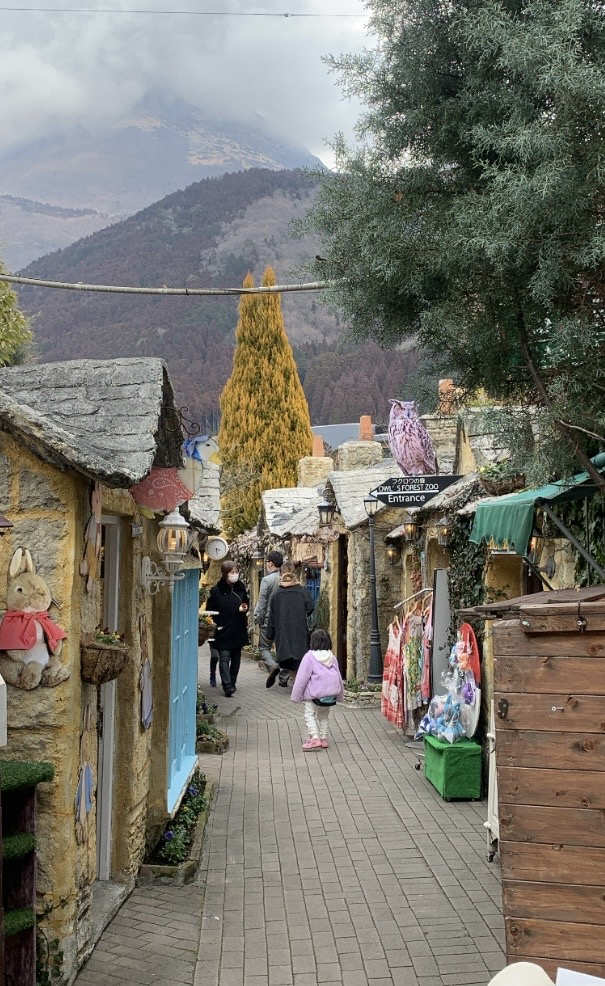
Yufuin Floral Village's small houses

Yufuin Floral Village (湯布院フローラルヴィレッジ) is another well-known tourist attraction in Yufuin. It features many small houses (acting as gift shops) modeled after the Cotswolds region of England.

With a suspension in COVID-19-related travel restrictions and the reintroduction of flights connecting Incheon International Airport and Oita Airport in 2024 for the first time in five years, Yufuin has seen a large increase in tourism from South Korea. In December 2023, 55,000 Korean tourists stayed overnight in Yufuin, more than four times higher than pre-COVID numbers.

== Annual events ==
- July: Yufuin Music Festival (ゆふいん音楽祭)
- August: Yufuin Film Festival (湯布院映画祭)
- October: Ushikurai Shouting Tournament (牛喰い絶叫大会)

== Transport ==
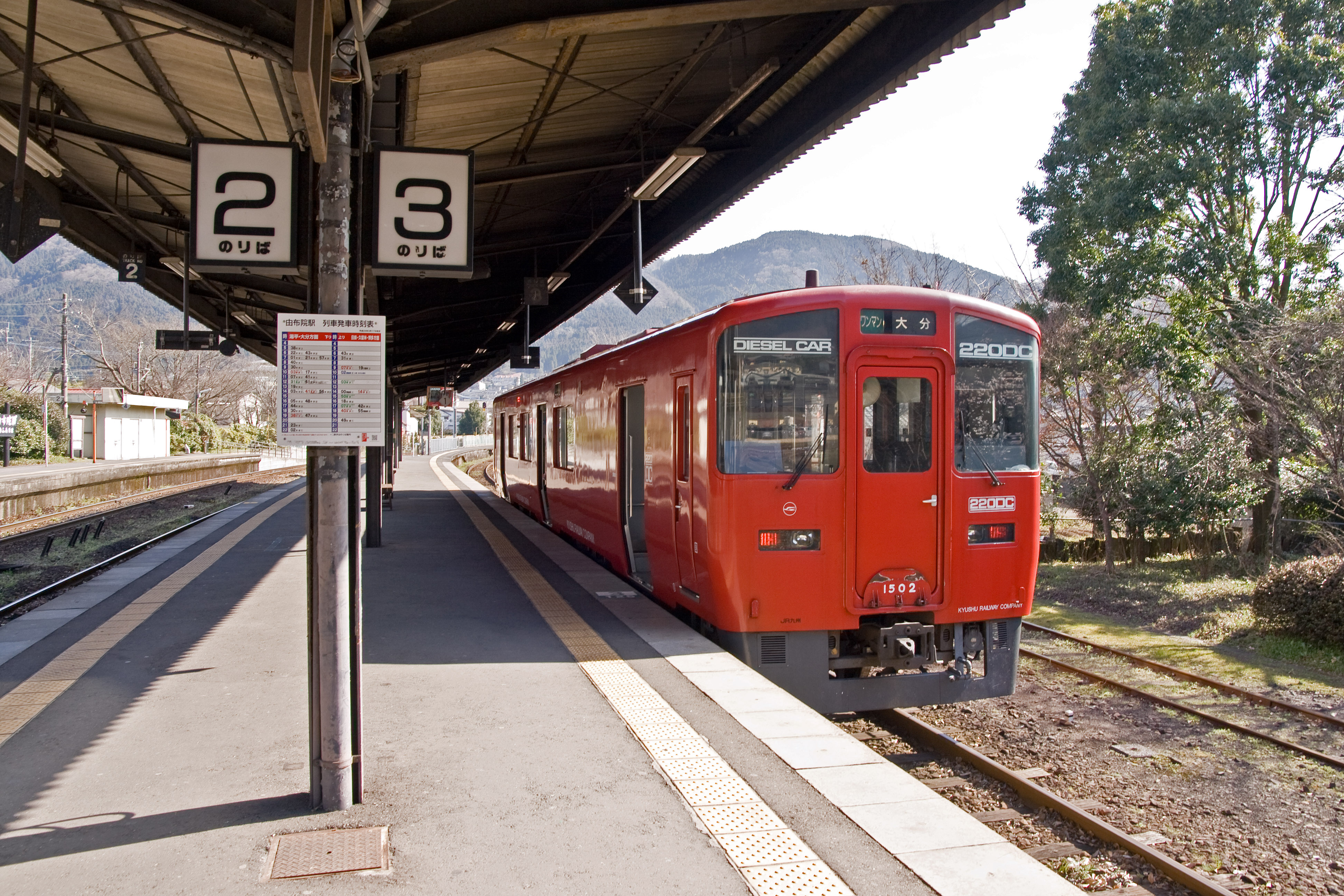
Yufuin Station

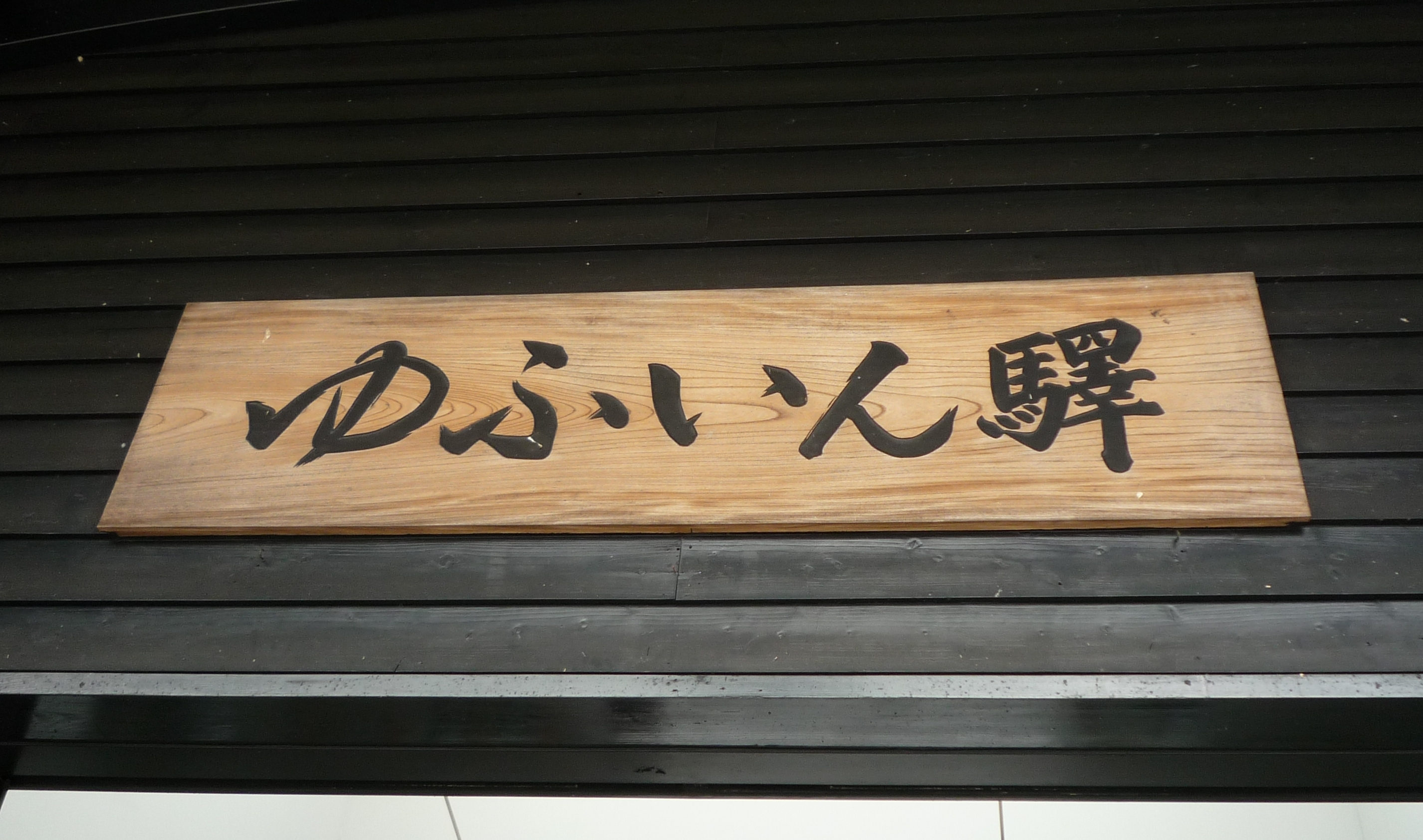
Yufuin Station sign in hiragana (ゆふいん)

=== Railway ===
JR Kyushu – Kyūdai Main Line

- Yufuin - Minami-Yufu - Yunohira

=== Highway ===
- Ōita Expressway – Yufuin interchange
- National Route 210

=== Bus ===
- Highway bus from Fukuoka

== TV drama ==
- Yufuin is the setting for the NHK Japanese television drama "Kaze no Haruka"
