= Mukainoharu Station =

Railway station in Yufu, Ōita Prefecture, Japan

Mukainoharu Station 向之原駅
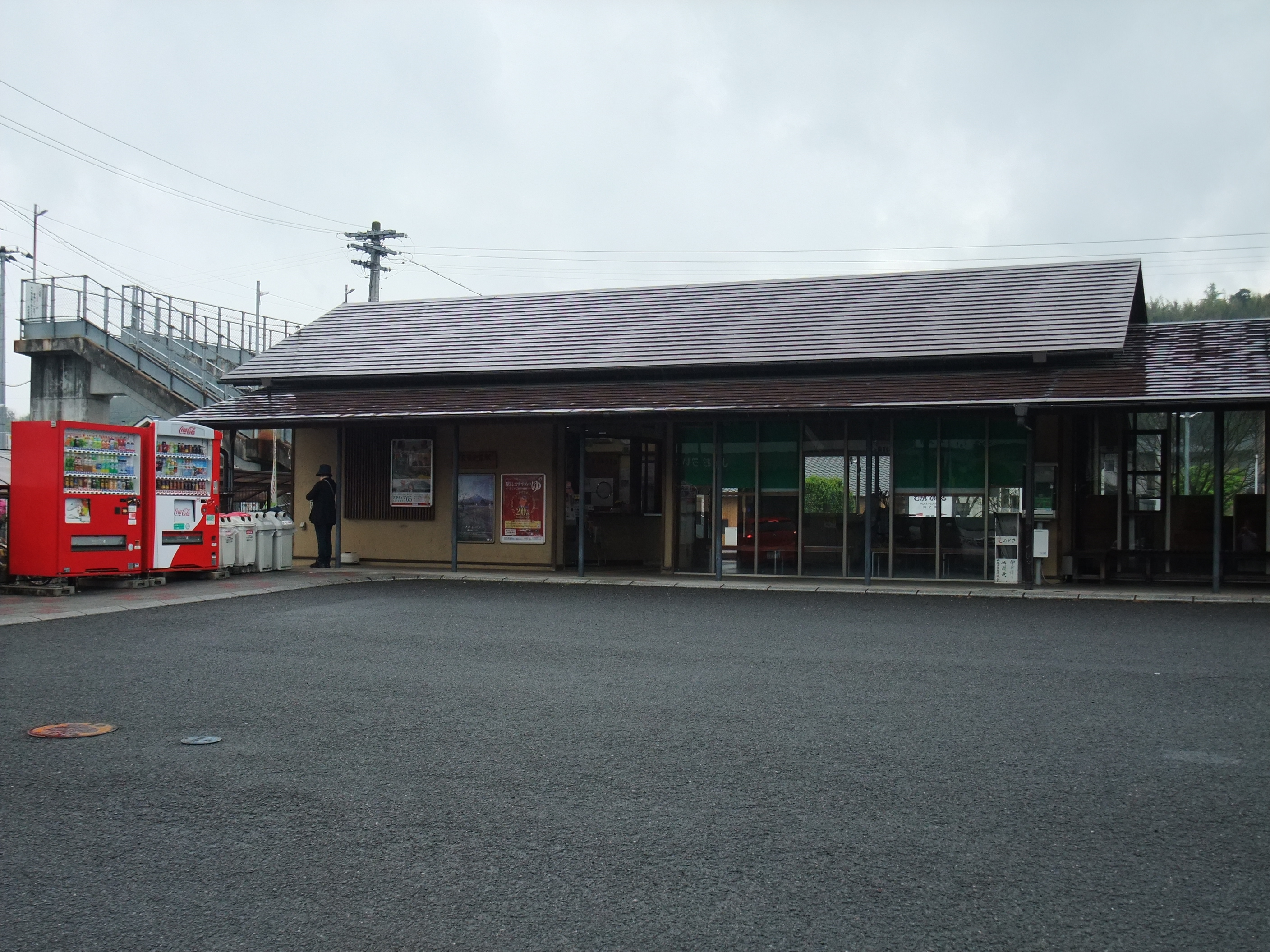
- Mukainoharu Station in April 2014

General information
- Location: Hasamamachi Mukainoharu, Yufu-shi, Ōita-ken 879-5502; Japan
- Coordinates: 33°11′48″N 131°30′50″E
- Operator: JR Kyushu
- Line: ■ Kyūdai Main Line
- Distance: 127.7 km from Kurume
- Platforms: 2 side platforms
- Tracks: 2 + 1 siding

Construction
- Accessible: No - platforms linked by footbridge

Other information
- Status: Staffed ticket window (outsourced)
- Website: Official website

History
- Opened: 30 October 1915
- Former names: Mukainohara (until 1 December 1922)

Passengers
- FY2016: 609 daily
- Rank: 221st (among JR Kyushu stations)

Services
Preceding station	JR Kyushu	Following station
Onigase towards Kurume	Kyūdai Main Line	Bungo-Kokubu towards Ōita
Location
- Location within Oita Prefecture Location within Japan

Mukainoharu Station (向之原駅, Mukainoharu-eki) is a passenger railway station located in Hasama neighborhood of the city of Yufu, Ōita Prefecture, Japan, operated by JR Kyushu.

== Lines ==
Mukainoharu Station is served by the Kyudai Main Line and is located 127.7 km from the starting point of the line at Kurume.

== Station layout ==
The station has two opposed side platforms serving two tracks with a siding. The platforms are connected by a footbridge. The station building is a modern steel frame structure which houses a waiting area, a staffed ticket window, an automatic ticket vending machine, a SUGOCA card charge machine and a SUGOCA card reader.

Management of the station has been outsourced to the JR Kyushu Tetsudou Eigyou Co., a wholly owned subsidiary of JR Kyushu specialising in station services. It staffs the ticket counter which is equipped with a POS machine but does not have a Midori no Madoguchi facility.

=== Platforms ===
1	■ ■ Kyūdai Main Line	for Yufuin, Hita and Kurume
2	■ ■ Kyūdai Main Line	for Kaku and Ōita

== History ==
The station opened on 30 October 1915 as a station on the Daito Railway (大湯鉄道) with the name originally read as "Mukainohara". The Daito Railway was nationalized and absorbed into the Japanese Government Railways on 1 December 1922, and the reading of the station name was changed to "Mukainoharu" from this date, although the Japanese characters for the name remained unchanged. With the privatization of Japanese National Railways (JNR) on 1 April 1987, the station came under the control of JR Kyushu.

== Passenger statistics ==
In fiscal 2016, the station was used by an average of 609 passengers daily (boarding passengers only), and it ranked 221st among the busiest stations of JR Kyushu.

== Surrounding area ==
- National Route 210
- Yufu City Hasama Elementary School
- Yufu City Hasama Junior High Scho

== See also ==
- List of railway stations in Japan
