= Shōnai Station (Ōita) =

Railway station in Yufu, Ōita Prefecture, Japan

Shōnai Station 庄内駅
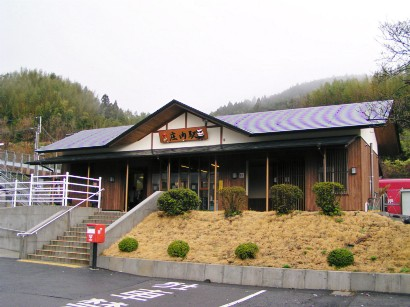
- Shōnai Station in September 2005

General information
- Location: Shōnaichō Shōnaibaru, Yufu-shi, Ōita-ken 879-5434; Japan
- Coordinates: 33°11′06″N 131°24′07″E
- Operator: JR Kyushu
- Line: ■ Kyūdai Main Line
- Distance: 114.5 km from Kurume
- Platforms: 2 side platforms
- Tracks: 2 + 1 siding

Construction
- Structure type: At grade
- Accessible: No - platforms linked by footbridge

Other information
- Status: Kan'i itaku agent on site
- Website: Official website

History
- Opened: 29 September 1923

Passengers
- FY2015: 110 daily

Services
Preceding station	JR Kyushu	Following station
Yunohira towards Kurume	Kyūdai Main Line	Tenjinyama towards Ōita
Location
- Location within Oita Prefecture Location within Japan

Shōnai Station (庄内駅, Shōnai-eki) is a passenger railway station located in Shōnai neighborhood of the city of Yufu, Ōita Prefecture, Japan, operated by JR Kyushu.

== Lines ==
The station is served by the Kyūdai Main Line and is located 114.5 km from the starting point of the line at Kurume.

== Layout ==
The station consists of two side platforms serving two tracks at grade with a siding. The station building is a modern structure built in 2004 in Japanese style. It houses a waiting area and there is a ticket window staffed by a kan'i itaku agent which sells some types of tickets. A ramp leads up to the station building from the forecourt but access to the opposite side platform is by means of a footbridge.

=== Platforms ===
1, 2	■ ■ Kyūdai Main Line	for Yufuin and Hita for Ōita

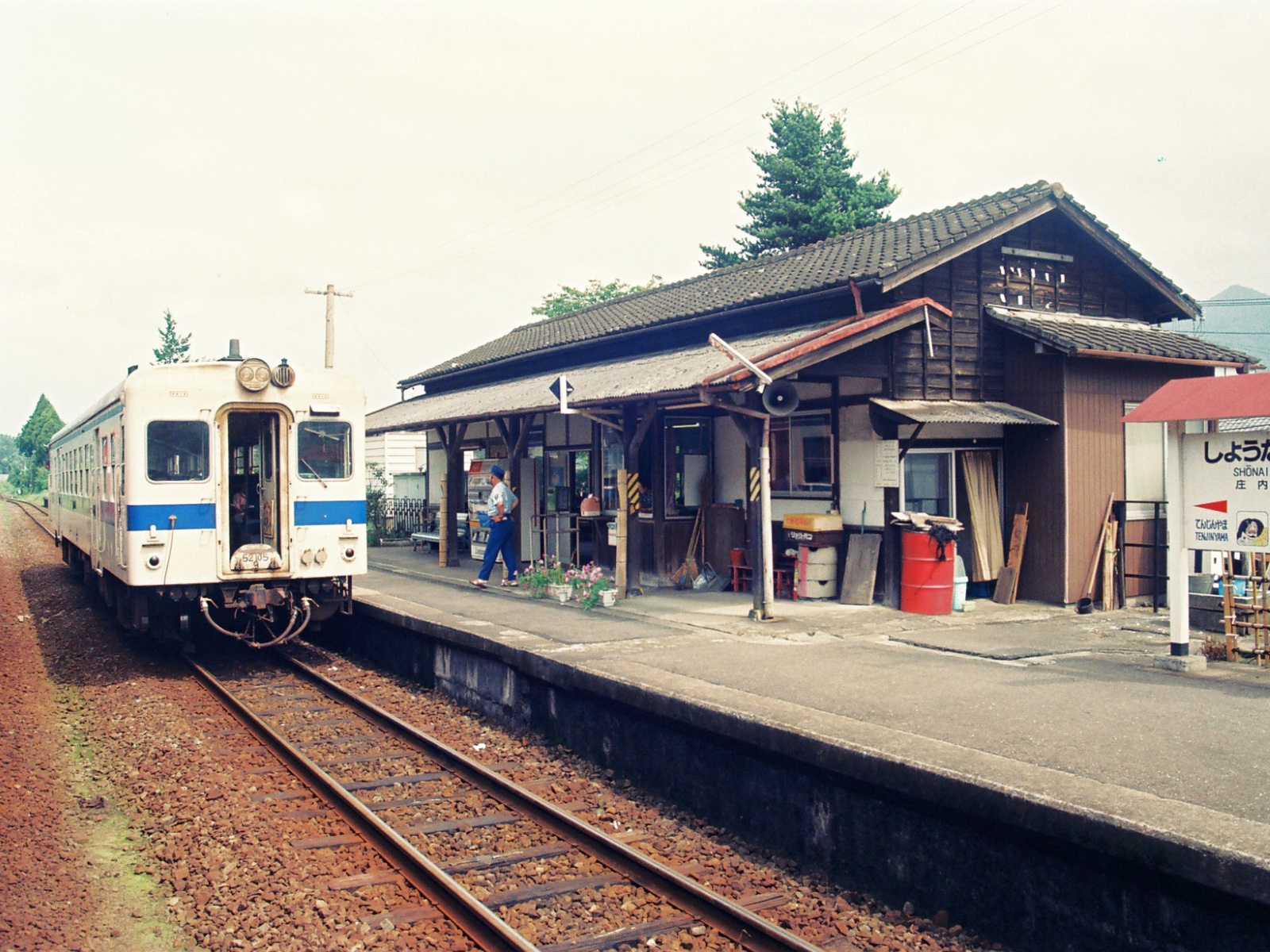
The old station building which was replaced in 2004. This picture was taken in 1991.

== History ==
The private Daito Railway (大湯鉄道) had opened a track between Ōita and Onoya in 1915. The Daito Railway was nationalized on 1 December 1922, after which Japanese Government Railways (JGR) undertook the next phase of expansion of what it designated as the Daito Line, extending the track and opening Yunohira as the new western terminus on 29 September 1923. On the same day, Shōnai was opened as an intermediate station along the new track. On 15 November 1934, when the Daito Line had linked up with the Kyudai Main Line further west, JGR designated the station as part of the Kyudai Main Line. With the privatization of Japanese National Railways (JNR), the successor of JGR, on 1 April 1987, the station came under the control of JR Kyushu.

== Passenger statistics ==
In fiscal 2015, there were a total of 40,094 boarding passengers, giving a daily average of 110 passengers.

== Surrounding area ==
- Japan National Route 210
- Yufu City Minami-Shonai Elementary School

== See also ==
- List of railway stations in Japan
