= Shōnai (disambiguation) =

Shōnai is a town in Yamagata Prefecture, Japan.

Shōnai may also refer to:

- Shōnai, Fukuoka, a former town in Fukuoka Prefecture
- Shōnai, Ōita, a former town in Ōita Prefecture
- Shōnai Domain, an Edo period domain
- Shōnai River, a river in Gifu Prefecture and Aichi Prefecture

== See also ==
- Shōnai Station (disambiguation)
