= Onigase Station =

Railway station in Yufu, Ōita Prefecture, Japan

Onigase Station 鬼瀬駅
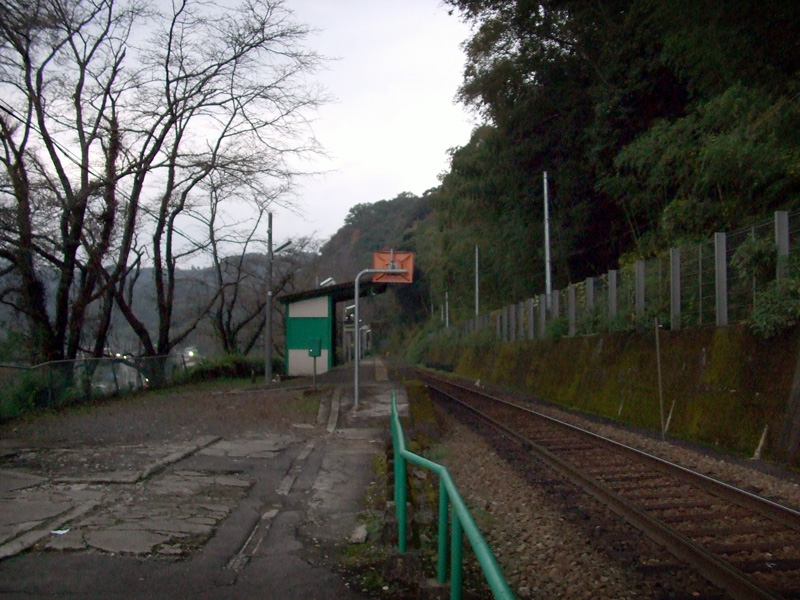
- Onigase Station in 2008

General information
- Location: Hasamamachi Onigase, Yufu-shi, Ōita-ken 879-5521; Japan
- Coordinates: 33°11′43″N 131°29′08″E
- Operator: JR Kyushu
- Line: ■ Kyūdai Main Line
- Distance: 124.6 km from Kurume
- Platforms: 1 side platform
- Tracks: 1

Construction
- Structure type: Side hill cutting

Other information
- Status: Unstaffed
- Website: Official website

History
- Opened: 30 October 1915

Passengers
- FY2015: 18 daily

Services
| Preceding station | JR Kyushu | Following station |
|---|---|---|
| Onoya towards Kurume | Kyūdai Main Line | Mukainoharu towards Ōita |
Location
- Location within Oita Prefecture Location within Japan

Onigase Station (鬼瀬駅, Onigase-eki) is a passenger railway station located in Hasama neighborhood of the city of Yufu, Ōita Prefecture, Japan, operated by JR Kyushu.

== Lines ==
The station is served by the Kyūdai Main Line and is located 124.6 km from the starting point of the line at Kurume.

== Layout ==
The station, which is unstaffed, consists of a side platform serving a single track on a side hill cutting. There is no station building, only a shelter on the platform and a toilet shed. A long ramp leads up to the platform from the access road.

== History ==
The private Daito Railway (大湯鉄道) opened a track from Ōita to Onoya on 30 October 1915. This station was opened on the same day as one of several intermediate stations along the track. On 1 December 1922, the Daito Railway was nationalized and absorbed into Japanese Government Railways, (JGR) which closed the station. Subsequently, JGR reopened the station on 3 February 1925. On 15 November 1934, when the Daito Line had linked up with the Kyudai Main Line further west, JGR designated the station as part of the Kyudai Main Line. With the privatization of Japanese National Railways (JNR), the successor of JGR, on 1 April 1987, the station came under the control of JR Kyushu.

== Passenger statistics ==
In fiscal 2015, there were a total of 6,393 boarding passengers, giving a daily average of 18 passengers.

== Surrounding area ==
- Oita River
- Kyushu Electric Power Shinohara Hydroelectric Power Plant/Shinohara Dam
- National Route 210

== See also ==
- List of railway stations in Japan
