= List of cities in Ōita Prefecture by population =

The following list sorts all cities (including towns) in the Japanese prefecture of Ōita with a population of more than 5,000 according to the 2020 Census. As of October 1, 2020, 17 places fulfill this criterion and are listed here. This list refers only to the population of individual cities, towns and villages within their defined limits, which does not include other municipalities or suburban areas within urban agglomerations.

== List ==
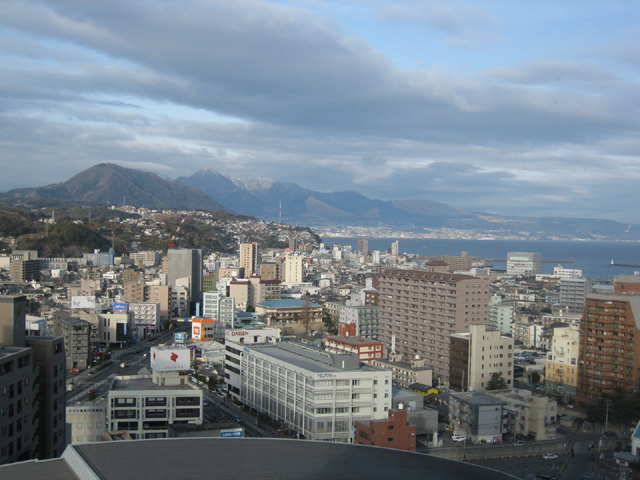
Ōita

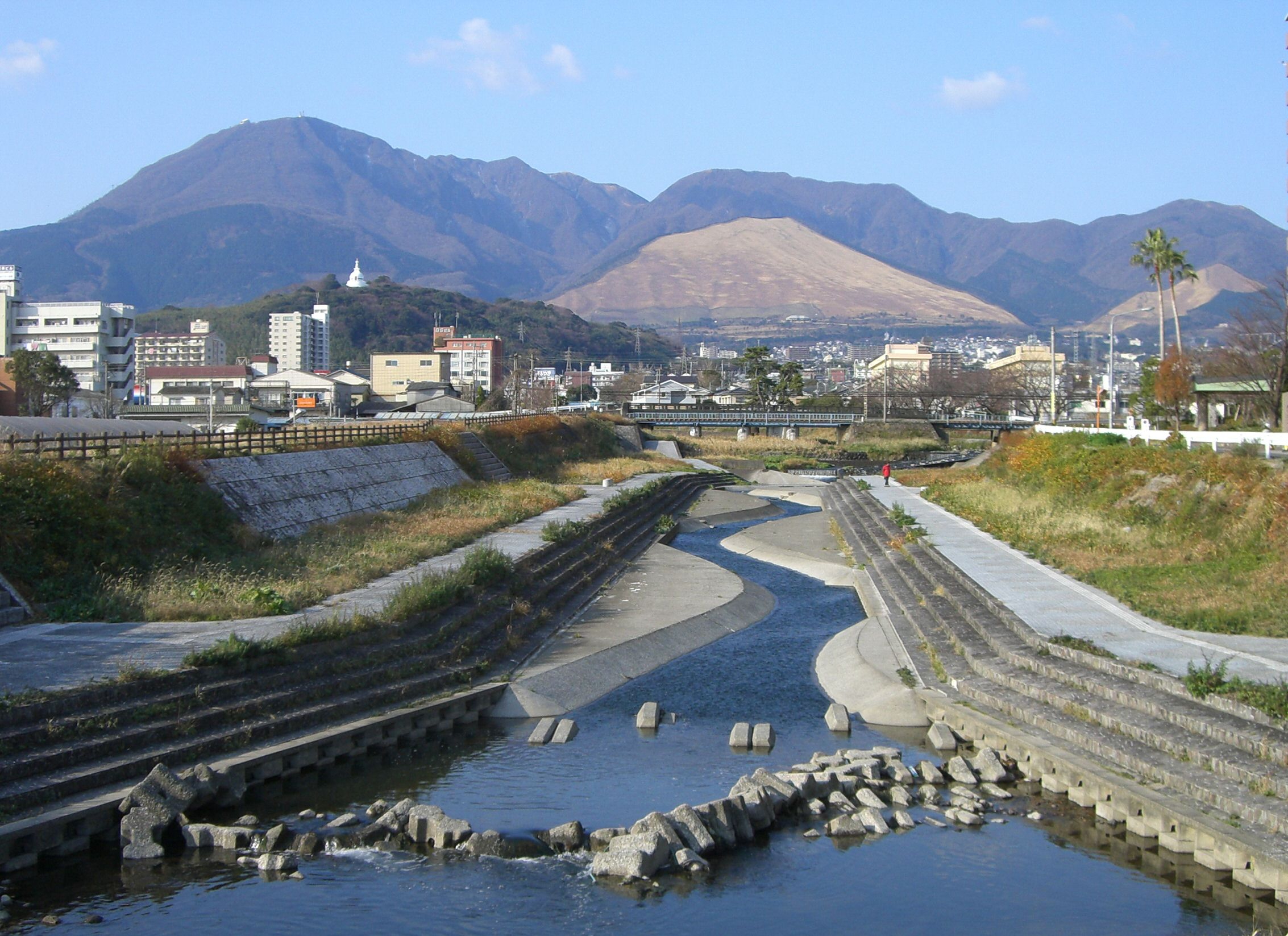
Beppu

The following table lists the 17 cities and towns in Ōita with a population of at least 5,000 on October 1, 2020, according to the 2020 Census. The table also gives an overview of the evolution of the population since the 1995 census.

Rank (2020)	Name	Status	2020	2015	2010	2005	2000	1995
1	Ōita	City	475,852	478,146	474,094	462,317	454,424	446,581
2	Beppu	City	115,416	122,138	125,385	126,959	126,523	128,255
3	Nakatsu	City	82,911	83,965	84,312	84,368	85,617	86,679
4	Saiki	City	66,908	72,211	76,951	80,297	84,449	88,116
5	Hita	City	62,697	66,523	70,940	74,165	77,369	79,776
6	Usa	City	52,810	56,258	59,008	60,809	62,349	63,819
7	Usuki	City	36,176	38,748	41,469	43,352	45,486	46,830
8	Bungo-ōno	City	33,741	36,584	39,452	41,548	43,371	45,191
9	Yufu	City	32,787	34,262	34,702	35,386	35,248	34,773
10	Kitsuki	City	28,025	30,185	32,083	33,567	33,363	33,370
11	Hiji	Town	27,747	28,058	28,221	27,640	26,142	24,433
12	Kunisaki	City	26,246	28,647	32,002	34,206	35,425	36,253
13	Bungotakada	City	22,142	22,853	23,906	25,114	26,206	27,337
14	Taketa	City	20,357	22,332	24,423	26,534	28,689	30,368
15	Tsukumi	City	16,109	17,969	19,917	21,456	23,164	24,848
16	Kusu	Town	14,399	15,823	17,054	18,276	18,988	19,659
17	Kokonoe	Town	8,548	9,645	10,421	11,108	11,566	12,022
