= Tenjinyama Station =

Railway station in Yufu, Ōita Prefecture, Japan

Tenjinyama Station 天神山駅
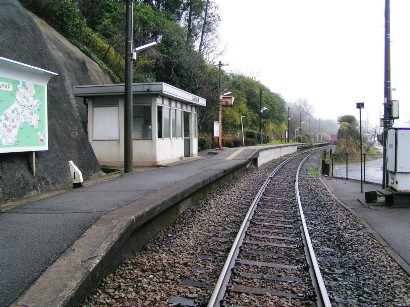
- Tenjinyama Station in September 2005

General information
- Location: Shōnaichō Nishichōhō, Yufu-shi, Ōita-keYufu, Oita 879-5406; Japan
- Coordinates: 33°11′14″N 131°26′19″E
- Operator: JR Kyushu
- Line: ■ Kyūdai Main Line
- Distance: 118.1 km from Kurume
- Platforms: 1 side platform
- Tracks: 1

Construction
- Structure type: At grade
- Accessible: No - steps up from access road

Other information
- Status: Unstaffed
- Website: Official website

History
- Opened: 29 September 1923

Passengers
- FY2015: 110 daily

Services
Preceding station	JR Kyushu	Following station
Shōnai towards Kurume	Kyūdai Main Line	Onoya towards Ōita
Location
- Location within Oita Prefecture Location within Japan

Tenjinyama Station (天神山駅, Tenjinyama-eki) is a passenger railway station located in Shōnai neighborhood of the city of Yufu, Ōita Prefecture, Japan, operated by JR Kyushu.

== Lines ==
The station is served by the Kyūdai Main Line and is located 118.1 km from the starting point of the line at Kurume.

== Layout ==
The station consists of a side platform serving a single track at grade. From the access road, a short flight of steps leads up to the track bed where a level crossing is used to cross the track to reach the platform. There is no station building but an enclosed shelter is provided.

== History ==
The private Daito Railway (大湯鉄道) had opened a track between Ōita and Onoya in 1915. The Daito Railway was nationalized on 1 December 1922, after which Japanese Government Railways (JGR) undertook the next phase of expansion of what it designated as the Daito Line, extending the track and opening Yunohira as the new western terminus on 29 September 1923. On the same day, Tenjinyama was opened as an intermediate station along the new track. On 15 November 1934, when the Daito Line had linked up with the Kyudai Main Line further west, JGR designated the station as part of the Kyudai Main Line. With the privatization of Japanese National Railways (JNR), the successor of JGR, on 1 April 1987, the station came under the control of JR Kyushu.

== Passenger statistics ==
In fiscal 2015, there were a total of 40,304 boarding passengers, giving a daily average of 110 passengers.

== Surrounding area ==
- Yufu City Shonai Junior High School
- Mt. Kurodake - Selected as one of Japan's top 100 natural landscapes.
- Yufu City Hall Main Office (formerly Shonai Town Hall)

== See also ==
- List of railway stations in Japan
