= Shōnai Station =

Shōnai Station (庄内駅) is the name of two train stations in Japan:

- Shōnai Station (Ōita)
- Shōnai Station (Osaka)

== See also ==
- Shōnai-dōri Station
- Chikuzen-Shōnai Station
- Shōnai Ryokuchi Kōen Station
