= Ōita District, Ōita =

Former district in Ōita prefecture, Japan

Ōita (大分郡, Ōita-gun) was a district located in Ōita Prefecture, Japan.

As of 2003, the district had an estimated population of 40,723 and density of 99.35 persons per km^{2}. The total area was 409.90 km^{2}.

== Dissolution ==
As of January 1, 2005 the district had 4 towns.

- Hasama
- Notsuharu
- Shōnai
- Yufuin

== Merger ==
- On January 1, 2005 - the town of Notsuharu, along with the town of Saganoseki (from Kitaamabe District), was merged with the expanded city of Ōita.
- On October 1, 2005 - the towns of Hasama, Shōnai and Yufuin were merged to create the city of Yufu. Therefore, Ōita District was dissolved as a result of this merger.

== See also ==
- Merger and dissolution of municipalities of Japan
