= Japan National Route 211 =

Road in Japan

National Route 211
- 国道211号
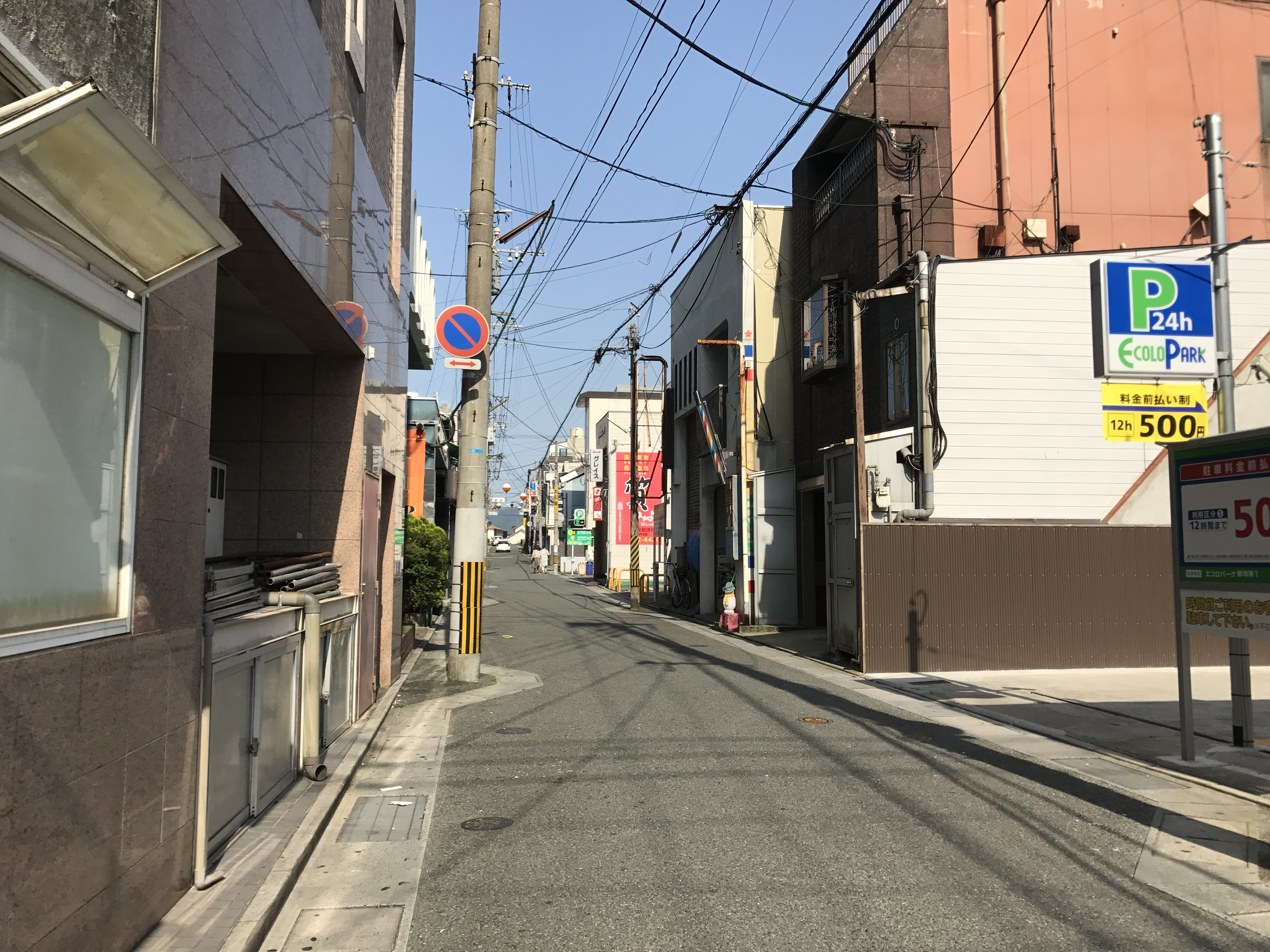

Route information
- Length: 76.3 km (47.4 mi)
- Existed: 18 May 1953–present

Major junctions
- North end: National Route 3 in Yahatanishi-ku, Kitakyūshū
- South end: National Route 210 in Hita

Location
- Country: Japan

Highway system
- National highways of Japan; Expressways of Japan
← National Route 210	→ National Route 212

National Route 211 is a national highway of Japan connecting Hita, Ōita and Yahatanishi-ku, Kitakyūshū in Japan, with a total length of 76.3 km (47.41 mi).
