= Onoya Station =

Railway station in Yufu, Ōita Prefecture, Japan

Onoya Station 小野屋駅
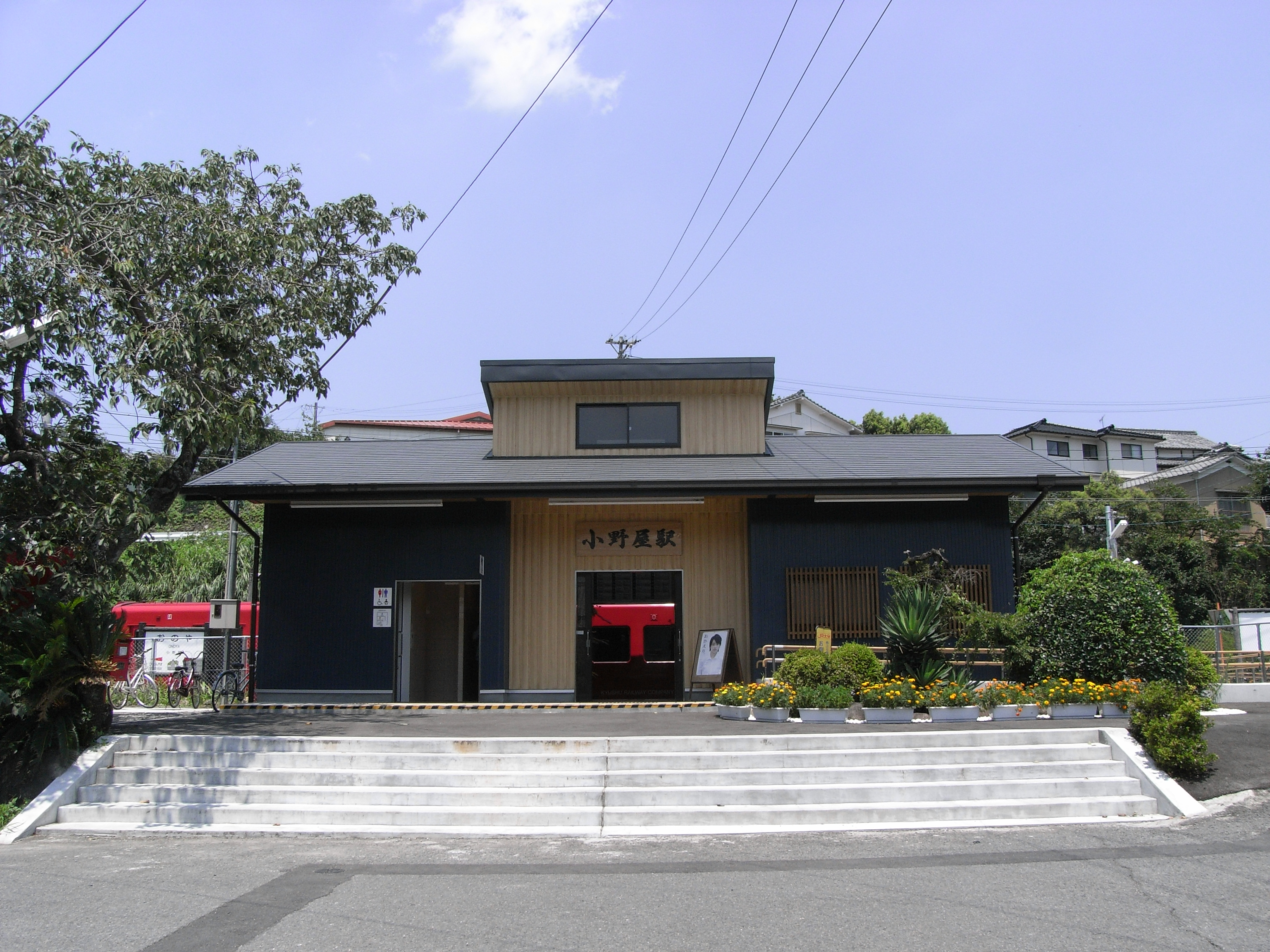
- Onoya Station in July 2007

General information
- Location: Shōnaichō Higashichōhō, Yufu-shi, Ōita-ken 879-5405; Japan
- Coordinates: 33°11′07″N 131°27′09″E
- Operator: JR Kyushu
- Line: ■ Kyūdai Main Line
- Distance: 119.6 km from Kurume
- Platforms: 2 side platforms
- Tracks: 2

Construction
- Structure type: At grade
- Accessible: No - platforms linked by footbridge

Other information
- Status: Unstaffed
- Website: Official website

History
- Opened: 30 October 1915

Passengers
- FY2016: 357 daily
- Rank: 284th (among JR Kyushu stations)

Services
Preceding station	JR Kyushu	Following station
Tenjinyama towards Kurume	Kyūdai Main Line	Onigase towards Ōita
Location
- Location within Oita Prefecture Location within Japan

Onoya Station (小野屋駅, Onoya-eki) is a passenger railway station located in Shōnai neighborhood of the city of Yufu, Ōita Prefecture, Japan, operated by JR Kyushu.

== Lines ==
The station is served by the Kyūdai Main Line and is located 119.6 km from the starting point of the line at Kurume.

== Layout ==
The station consists of two side platforms serving two tracks at grade. The station building, a modern steel structure, is unstaffed and serves only to house a waiting area and an automatic ticket vending machine. From the access road, it is necessary to go up a short flight of steps to enter the station building. Access to the opposite side platform is by means of a footbridge.

=== Platforms ===
1	■ ■ Kyūdai Main Line	for Yufuin and Hita
2	■ ■ Kyūdai Main Line	for Ōita

== History ==
The private Daito Railway (大湯鉄道) opened the station on 30 October 1915 as the western terminus of a track which it had laid from Ōita. On 1 December 1922, the Daito Railway was nationalized and absorbed into Japanese Government Railways, (JGR) which designated the track which served the station as part of the Daito Line. On 29 September 1923, Onoya became a through-station when the track was extended further west to Yunohira. On 15 November 1934, when the Daito Line had linked up with the Kyudai Main Line further west, JGR designated the station as part of the Kyudai Main Line. With the privatization of Japanese National Railways (JNR), the successor of JGR, on 1 April 1987, the station came under the control of JR Kyushu.

The station, which formerly had an outsourced ticket window, became unstaffed from April 2016.

== Passenger statistics ==
In fiscal 2016, the station was used by an average of 357 passengers daily (boarding passengers only), and it ranked 284th among the busiest stations of JR Kyushu.

== Surrounding area ==
- Monument to Santoka Taneda
- Yufu City Anan Elementary School

== See also ==
- List of railway stations in Japan
