= Mount Yufu =

Volcano on the island of Kyushu, Japan

- 由布岳
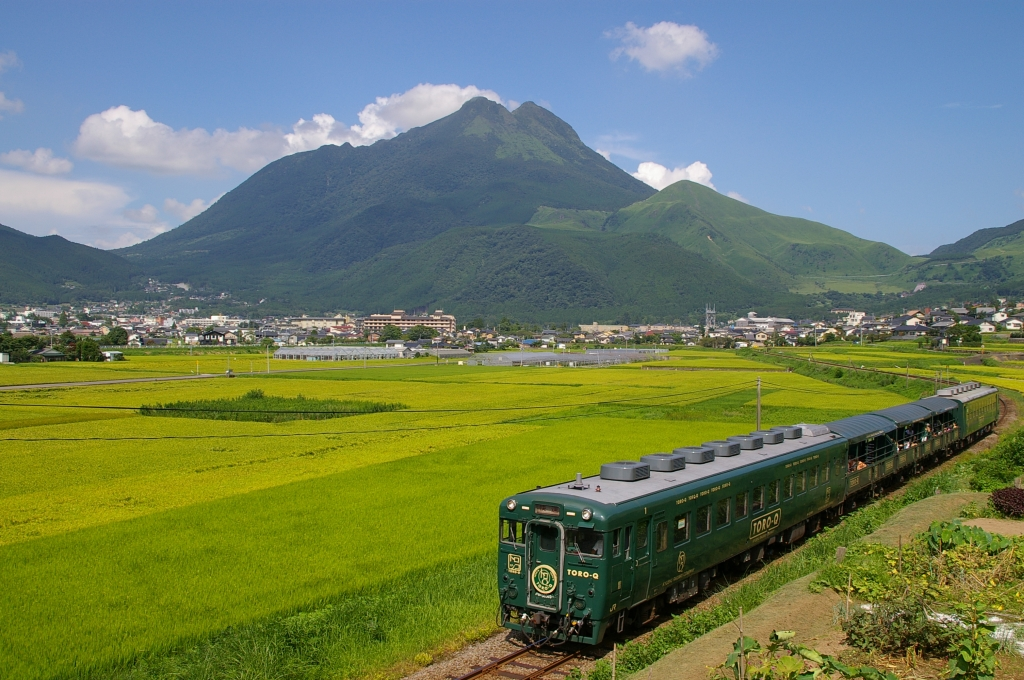
- Mount Yufu from the southwest

Highest point
- Elevation: 1,583.3 m (5,195 ft)
- Listing: List of mountains and hills of Japan by height
- Coordinates: 33°16′56″N 131°23′24″E

Naming
- Language of name: Japanese
- Pronunciation: [juɸudake]

Geography
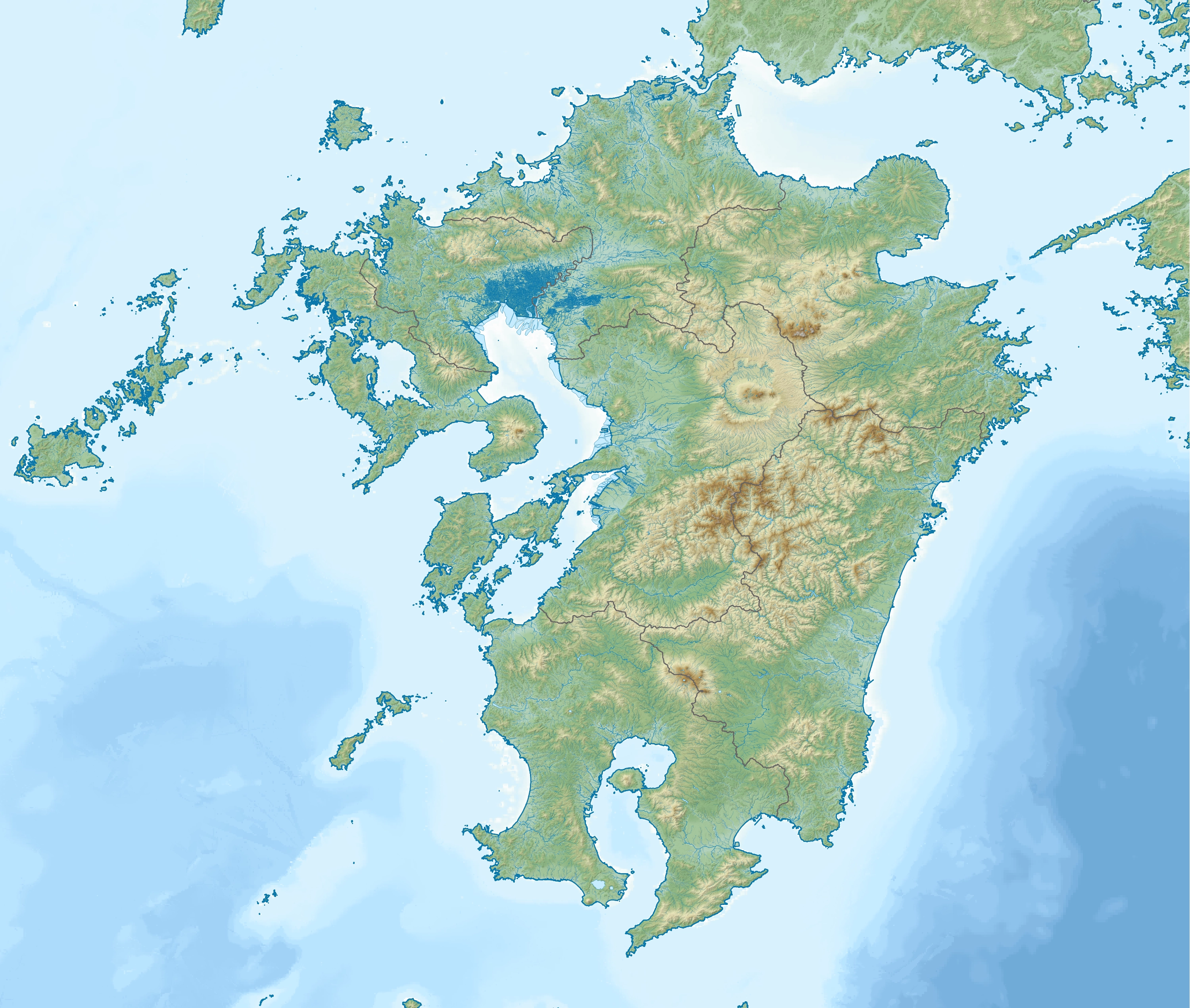
- Location within Japan Location within Kyushu
- Location: On the border of Yufu and Beppu, Ōita, Japan
- Topo map: Geographical Survey Institute 25000:1 別府西

Geology
- Mountain type: Stratovolcano

Mount Yufu (由布岳, Yufudake) is a 1,583.3 m (5,195 ft) volcano located on the border of Yufu and Beppu, Ōita, Japan. It is located within Aso Kujū National Park.

== Overview ==
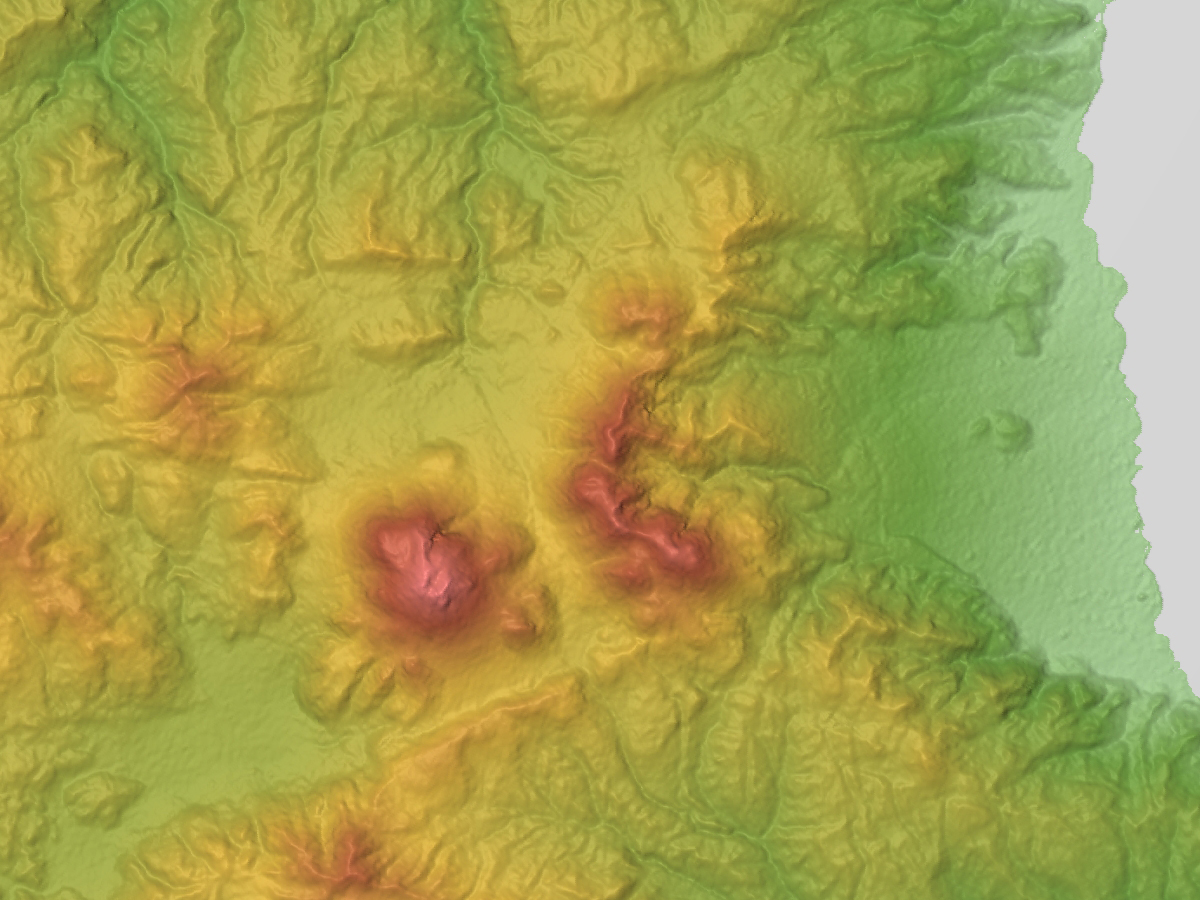
Relief map of Yufu Volcano (Left) & Tsurumi Volcano (Center)

Mount Yufu is a stratovolcano. Its most recent eruption about 2,200 years ago caused part of the mountain to collapse. Sometimes referred to as "Bungo Fuji," it has two peaks. The west peak (西峰, nishi-mine) is about one meter higher than the east peak (東峰, higashi-mine).

At the base of the mountain is Yufuin, a tourist town famous for its onsen. Some onsen baths in the town offer a view of Mount Yufu.

== Route ==
The most popular route is from Yufu Tozanguchi Bus Stop of Kamenoi Bus. It takes two and half hours. There are other routes from Yufu City and Higashi Tozanguchi Bus Stop. From the summit, Beppu Bay, Yufuin, and the Kujū Mountain Range are visible. Both the east peak and west peak are climbable, with the west peak being considered more challenging than the east.

== Gallery ==
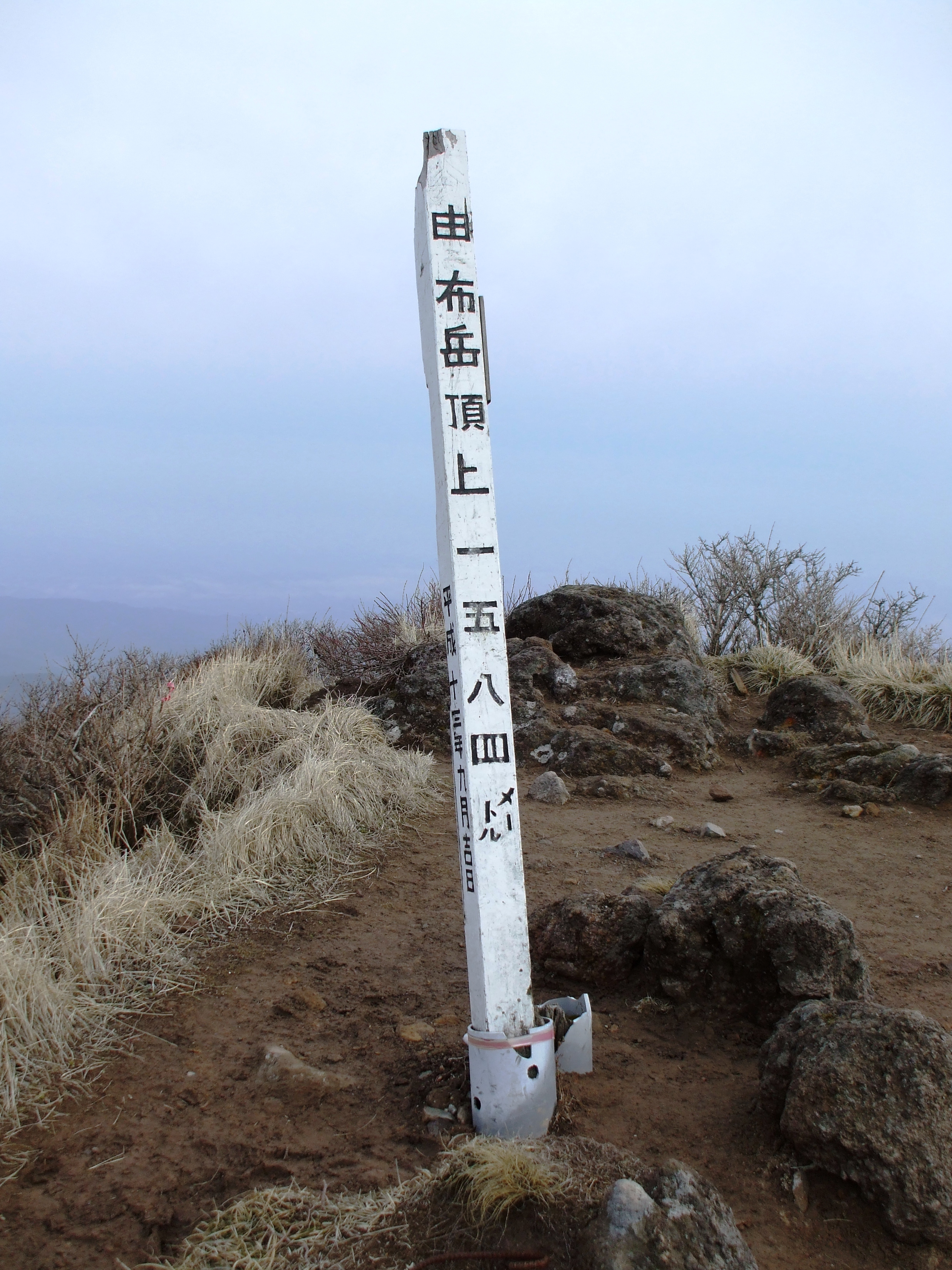
Summit

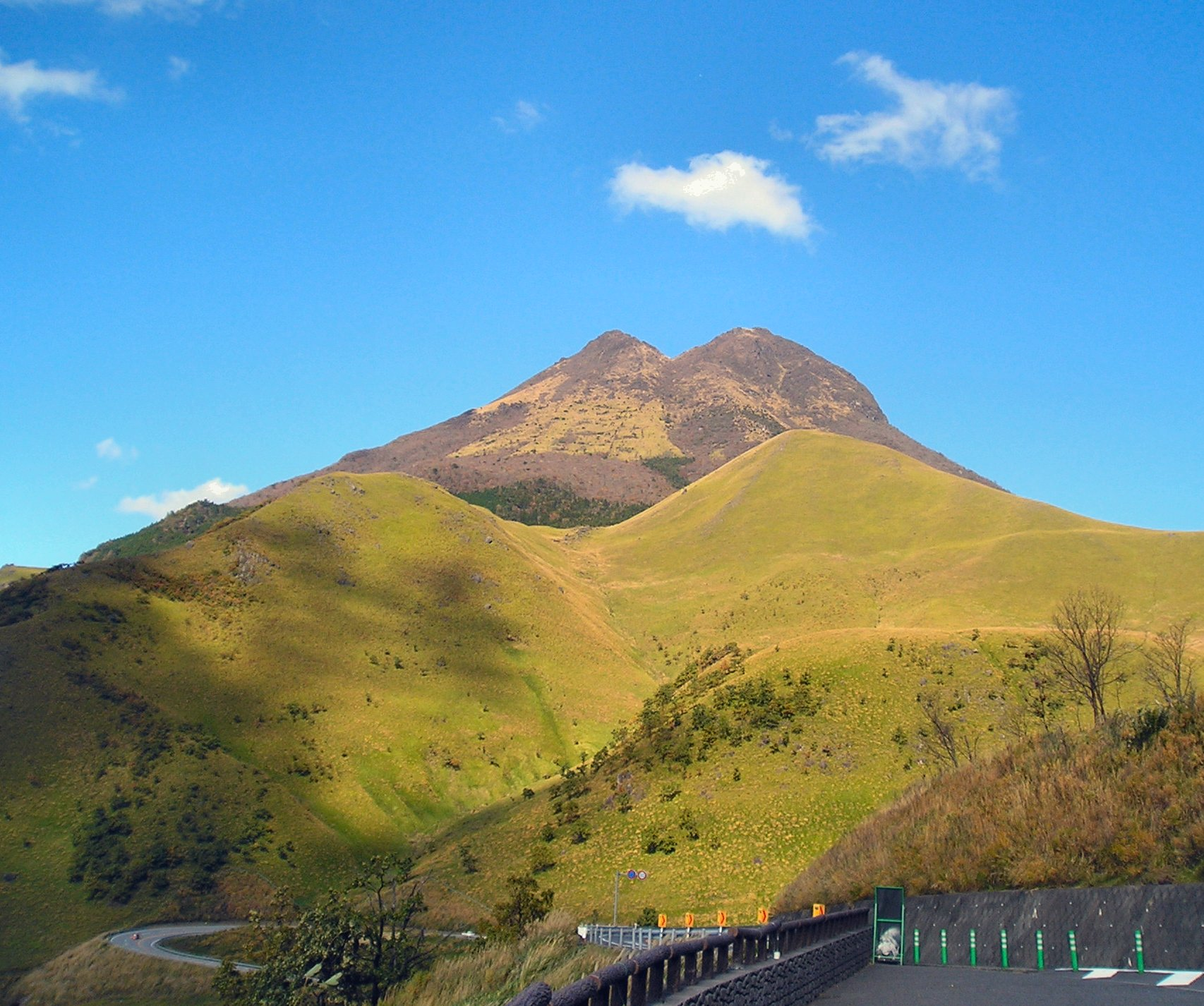
Southwest side

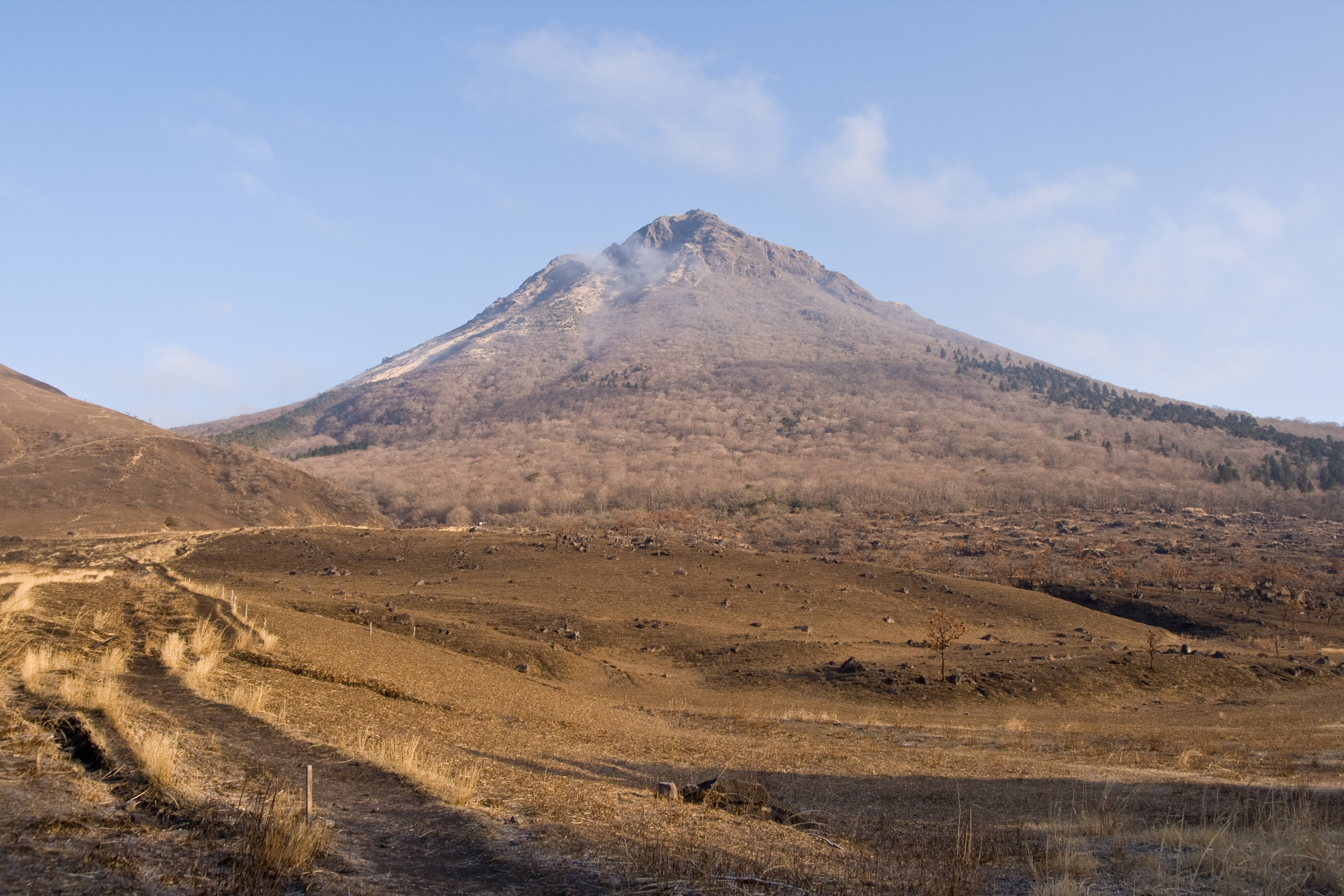
South side

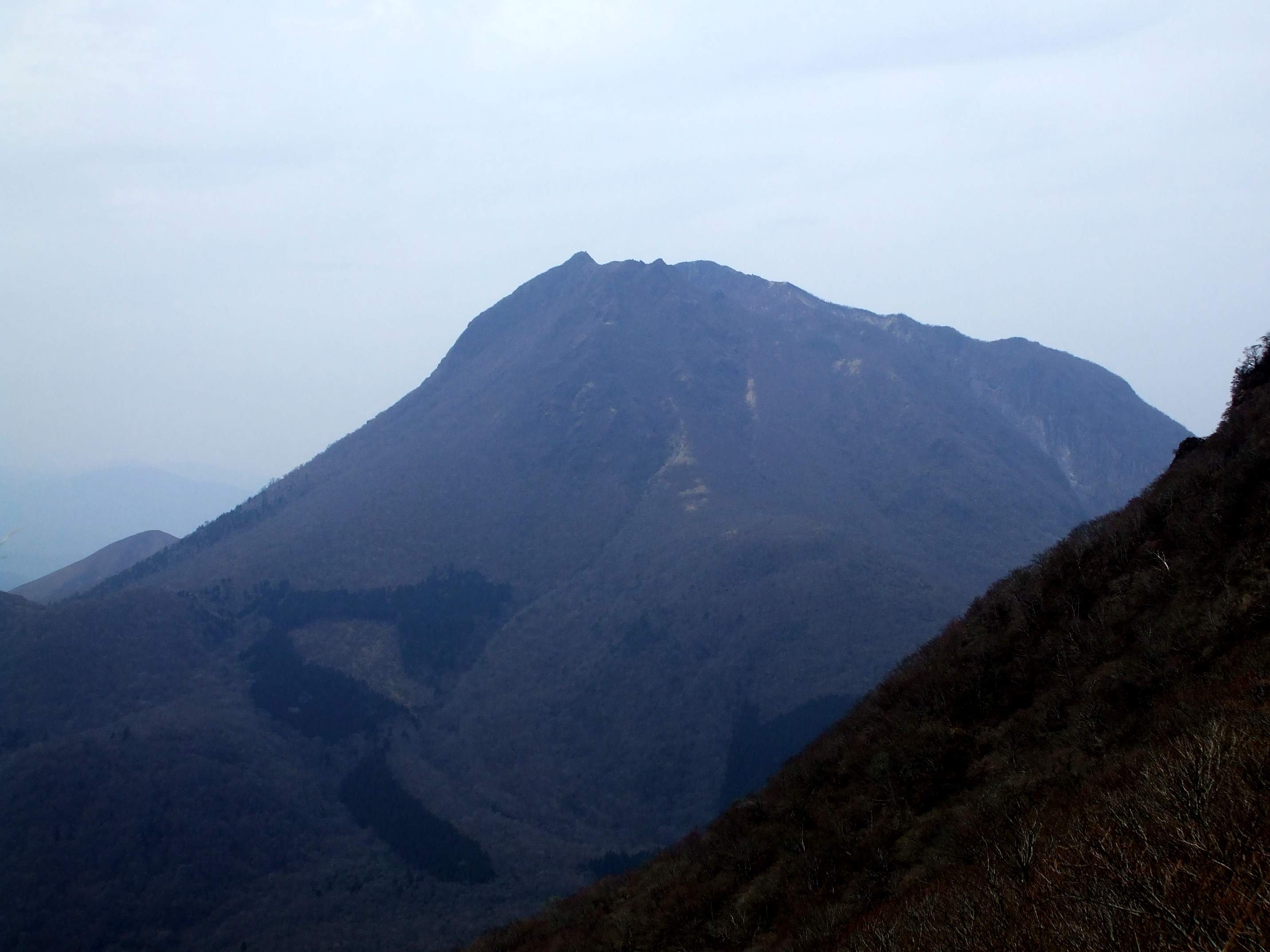
Viewed from Mt. Tsurumi

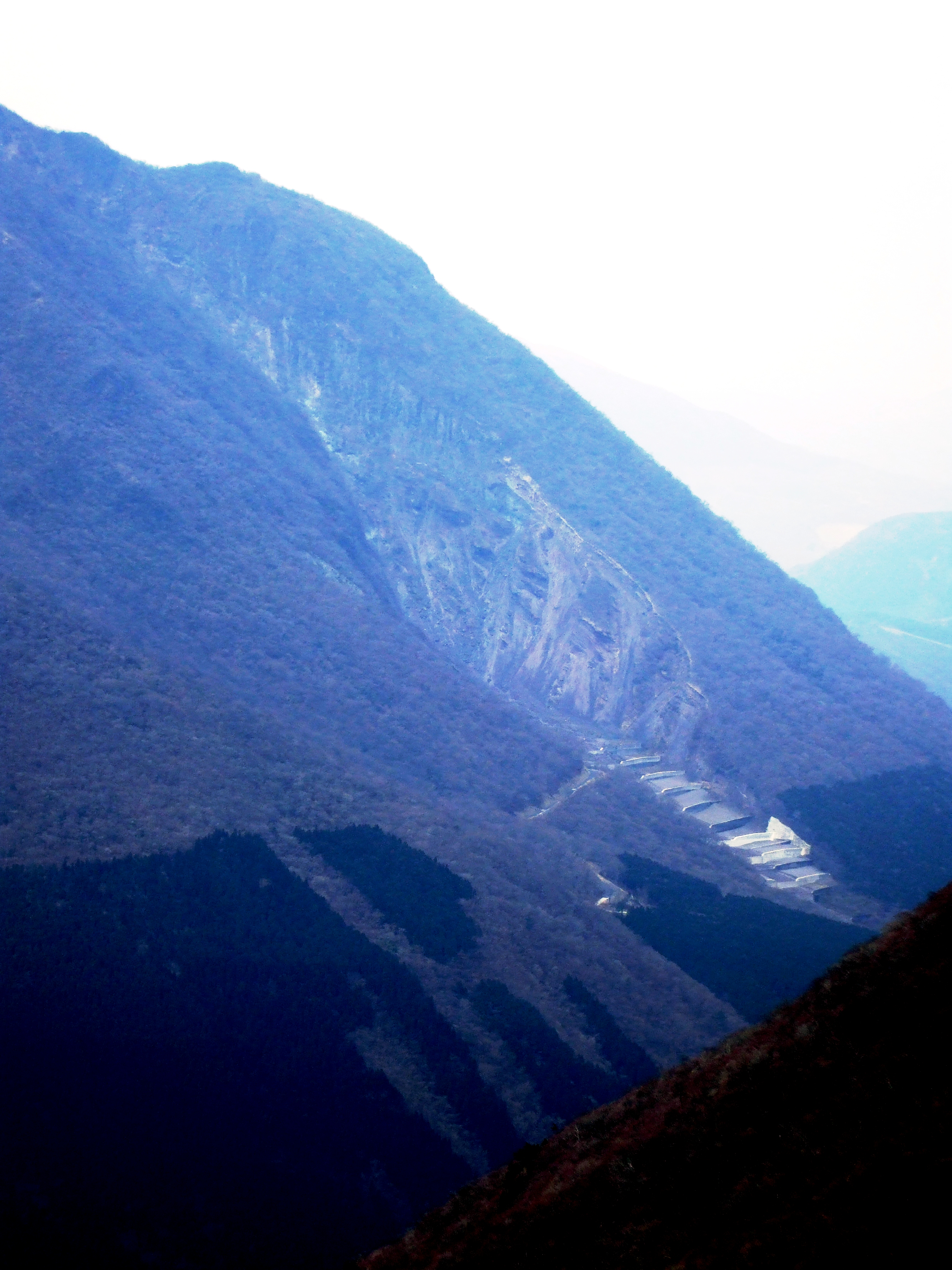
Collapsed section

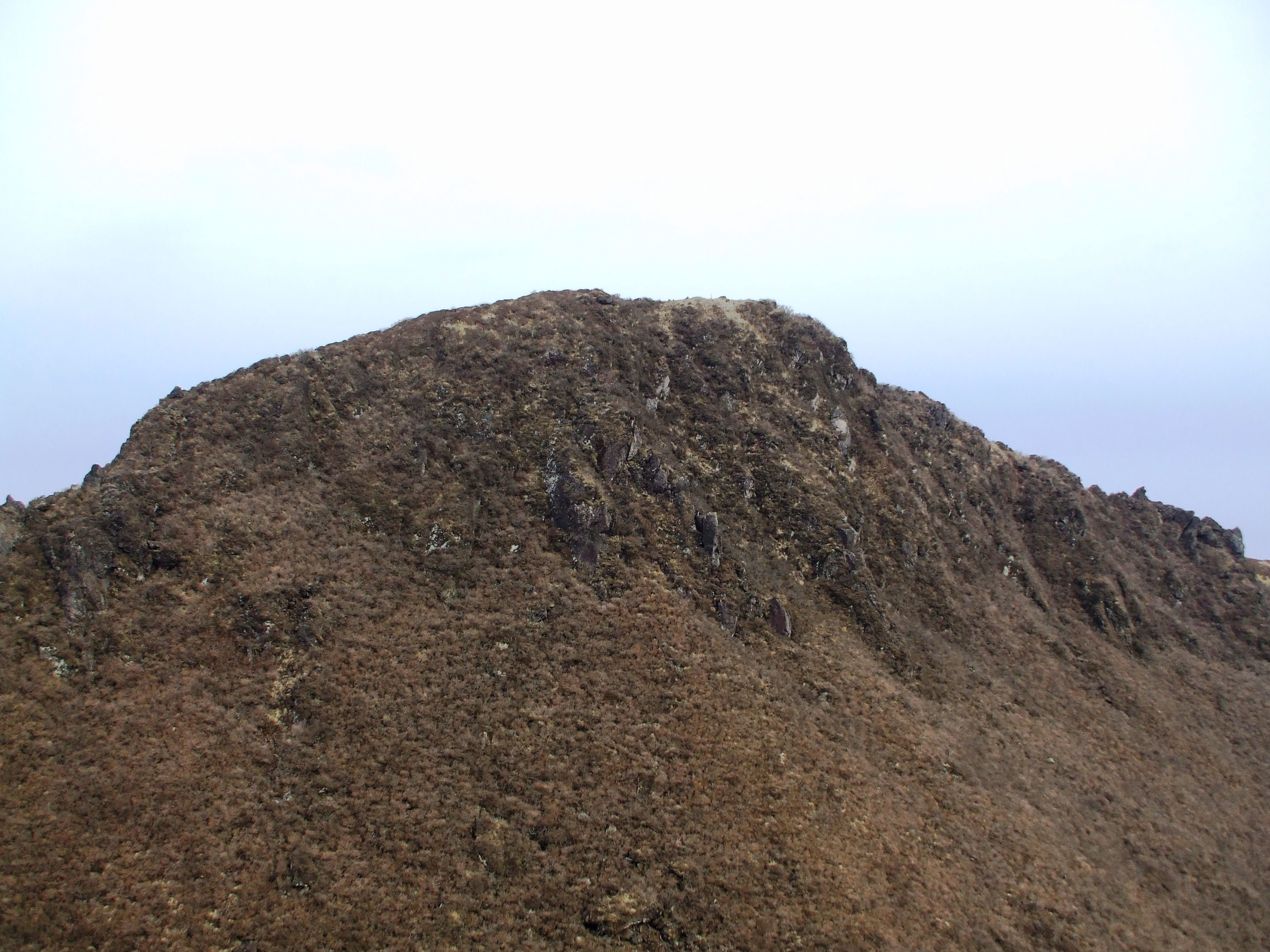
West Peak

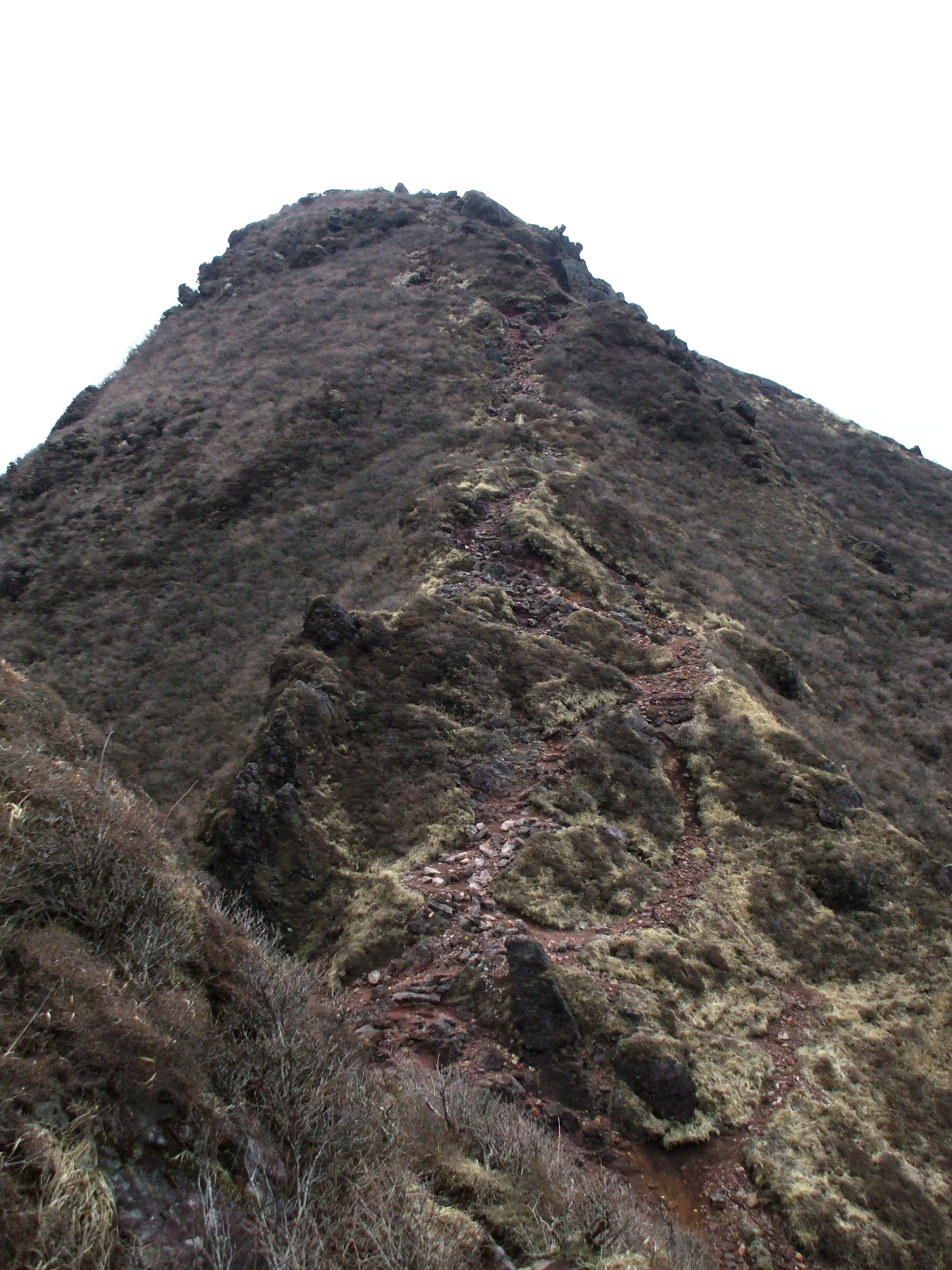
East Peak

== See also ==
- List of volcanoes in Japan
- List of mountains in Japan
