= Notsuharu, Ōita =

Dissolved municipality in Ōita prefecture, Japan

Notsuharu (野津原町, Notsuharu-machi) was a town located in Ōita District, Ōita Prefecture, Japan.

== Population ==
As of 2003, the town had an estimated population of 5,055 and the density of 55.71 persons per km^{2}. The total area was 90.74 km^{2}.

== Merge ==
On January 1, 2005, Notsuharu, along with the town of Saganoseki (from Kitaamabe District), was merged with the expanded city of Ōita.
