= Kitaamabe District, Ōita =

Former district in Ōita prefecture, Japan

Kita-Amabe (北海部郡, Kita-Amabe-gun) was a district located in Ōita Prefecture, Japan.

The district had only the town of Saganoseki until December 31, 2004. But on January 1, 2005, Saganoseki, along with the town of Notsuharu (from Ōita District), was merged into the expanded city of Ōita, and Kita-Amabe District was dissolved as a result of this merger.

== Municipal Timeline ==
- July 22, 1878 - Kita-Amabe District was founded after Amabe District broke off into Kita-Amabe and Minami-Amabe Districts.
- April 1, 1889 - Prior to the town and village status activated, Kita-Amabe District founded the town of Usuki and Saganoseki, as well as 25 villages.
- October 28, 1892:
  - The village of Saga (佐加村) renamed to the village of Saga (佐賀村).
  - The village of Hotojima broke off from the village of Shihoto. Shihoto was later renamed to Youra.
- June 1, 1907 - The villages of Higashi-Ōzai and Nishi-Ōzai were merged to create the village of Ōzai.
- July 1, 1907:
  - The village of Saga and Ichi were merged to create the village of Sagaichi.
  - The villages of Kōmeki and Ōjūki were merged to create the village of Kanzaki.
  - The village of Naka-Usuki and Kami-Minamitsuru were merged to create the village of Minamitsuru.
  - The town of Usuki, and the villages of Ichihama, Shimo-minamitsuru and Kamiura were merged to create the town of Usuki.
- January 1, 1920 - The village of Sagaichi was elevated to town status and renamed as the town of Sakanoichi.
- January 1, 1921 - The village of Tsukumi was elevated to town status and renamed as the town of (津組村->津久見町).
- April 1, 1928 - The village of Aoe was elevated to town status.
- April 1, 1933 - The towns of Tsukumi and Aoe, and the village of Shitaura were merged to create the town of Tsukumi.
- November 3, 1941 - The town of Sakanoichi, and the villages of Kozai and Nyū were merged to create the town of Sakanoichi.
- January 1, 1950 - The village of Kawazoe was sent to Ōita District.
- April 1, 1950 - The town of Usuki, and the village of Amabe were merged to create the city of Usuki.
- April 1, 1951 - The town of Tsukumi, and the villages of Hijiro, Youra and Hotojima were merged to create the city of Tsukumi.
- March 31, 1954 - The villages of Sashiu, Shitanoe, Shimo-kitatsuru, Kami-kitatsuru and Minamitsuru were absorbed into the city of Usuki.
- January 1, 1955 - The town of Saganoseki, and the villages of Kanzaki and Isshakuya were merged to create the town of Saganoseki.
- March 10, 1963 - The town of Sakanoichi, and the village of Ōzai were merged with the town of Oita and Dainan (both from Ōita District) and the cities of Ōita and Tsurusaki to create the city of Ōita.
- January 1, 2005 - The town of Saganoseki was merged into the expanded city of Ōita. Kita-Amabe District was dissolved as a result of this merger.
