= Yufu =

Yufu 由布市
- City
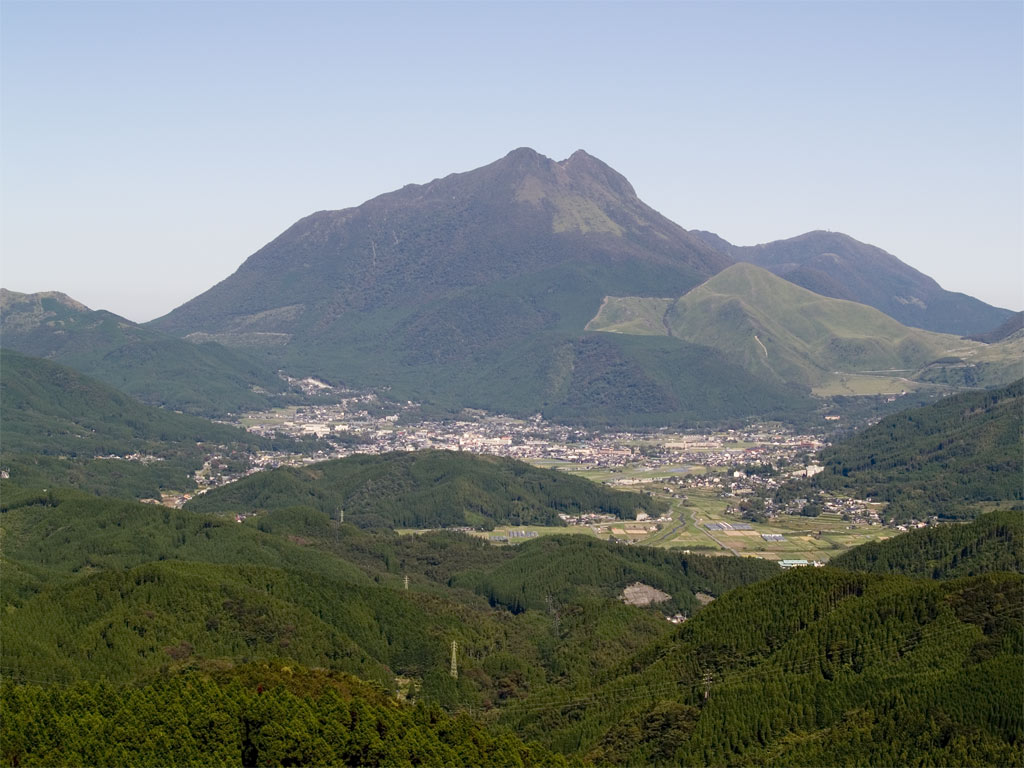
- Mount Yufu (Yufu-dake) is a symbol of Yufu City

- Flag Chapter
- Location of Yufu in Ōita Prefecture

- Location in Japan
- Coordinates: 33°10′48″N 131°25′36″E
- Country: Japan
- Region: Kyushu
- Prefecture: Ōita

Area
  - Total: 319.32 km^{2} (123.29 sq mi)

Population (November 30, 2023)
  - Total: 33,556
  - Density: 105.09/km^{2} (272.17/sq mi)
- Time zone: UTC+09:00 (JST)
- City hall address: 302 Kakihara, Shōnai-chō, Yufu-shi, Ōita-ken 879-5498
- Climate: Cfa
- Website: Official website
- Symbols
- Bird: Japanese bush warbler
- Flower: Cosmos
- Tree: Japanese Blue Oak

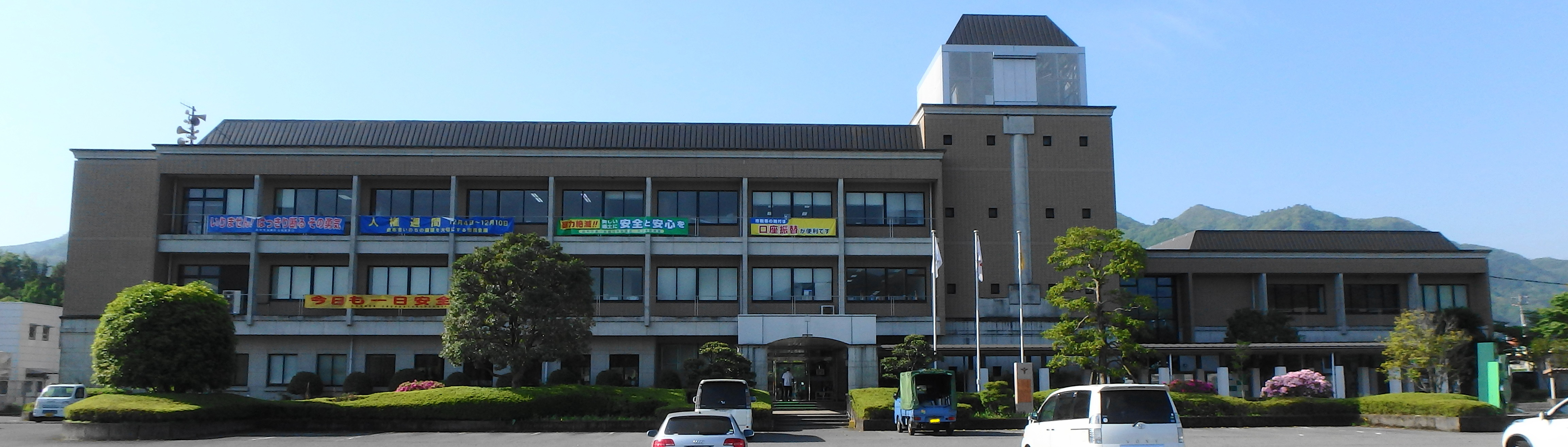
Yufu City Hall

Yufu (由布市, Yufu-shi) is a city in Ōita Prefecture. As of 30 November 2023, the city had an estimated population of 33,556 in 15,883 households, and a population density of 110 inhabitants per square kilometer (280/sq mi). The total area of the city is 319.32 km^{2} (123.29 sq mi).

== Geography ==
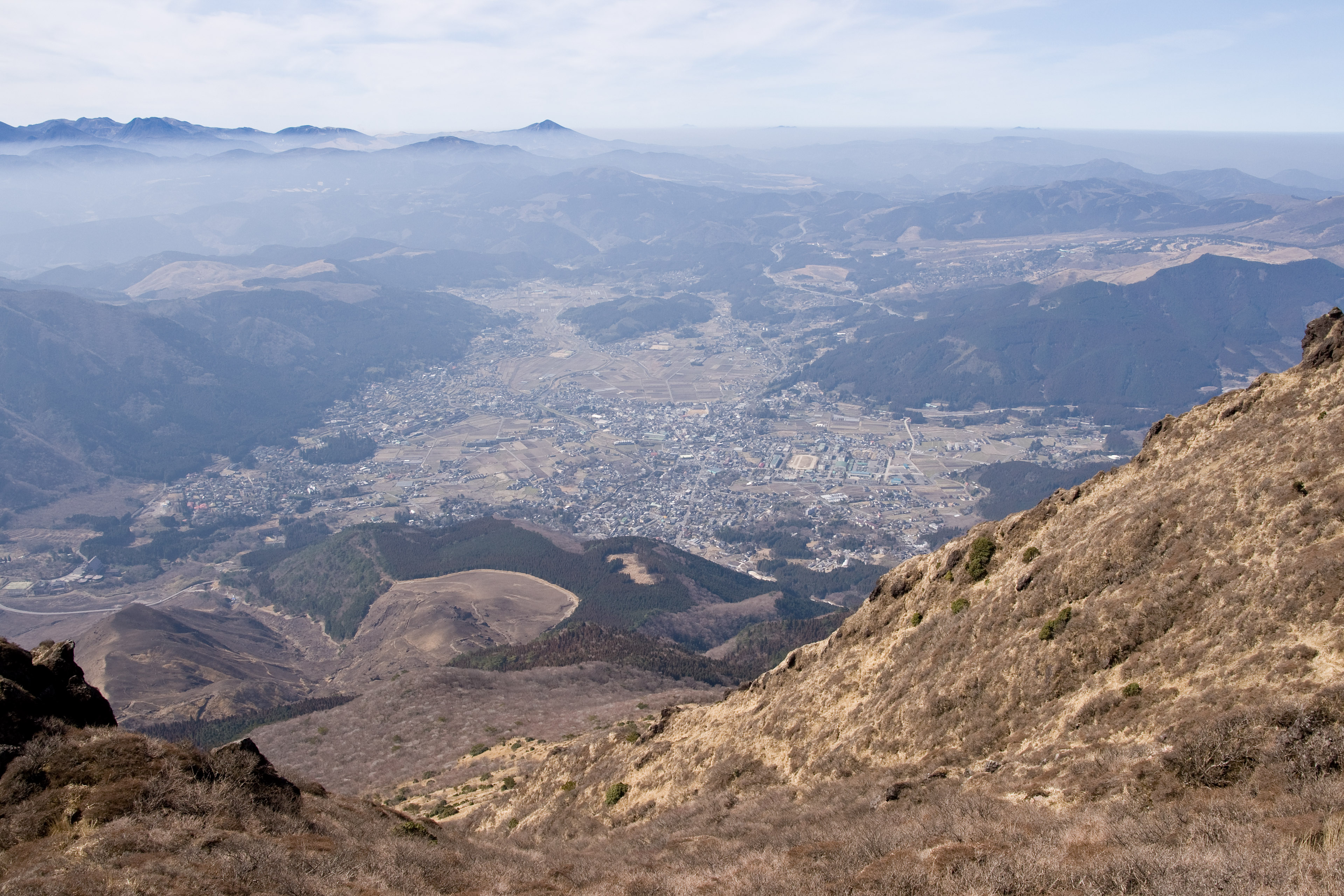
Busy area of Yufu City. Taken from Mount Yufu.

Yufu is located almost in the center of Ōita Prefecture, with high mountains such as Mt. Yufudake (1,583 meters or 5,194 feet) and Mt. Jogatake in the north, and Mt. Kurodake, Mt. Hanamure, and Mt. Toki in the south. The urban area is concentrated near the flatland formed by the alluvial fan of the Ōita River that flows through the center of the city, with the former Yufuin Town near the headwaters and Yufuin Basin, the former Shōnai Town on the left and right of the river terraces in the middle, and the former Hasama Town on the downstream and plain areas. Some areas of the former Shōnai Town and former Yufuin Town have been designated as Aso Kujū National Park. Mizuki Pass, located on the border with Kokonoe Town along Japan National Route 210, forms one of the central watersheds in Kyushu, separating the Ōita River water system on the Yufu City side and the Chikugo River water system on the Kokonoe Town side. There are five hot springs located throughout the city, including the nationally famous Yufuin Onsen, and most of the city has been designated as the national hot spring resort, Yufuin Onsenkyo.

=== Rivers ===
- Iwaki River
- Ōita River
- Yufu River

=== Lakes ===
- Lake Kinrin
- Lake Yamashita

=== Neighboring municipalities ===
Ōita Prefecture

- Beppu
- Kujū
- Kusu
- Ōita
- Usa
- Taketa

=== Climate ===
Yufu has a humid subtropical climate (Köppen climate classification Cfa) with hot summers and cool winters. Precipitation is significant throughout the year, but is somewhat lower in winter. The average annual temperature in Yufu is 13.3 °C (55.9 °F). The average annual rainfall is 1,992.2 mm (78.43 in) with June as the wettest month. The temperatures are highest on average in August, at around 24.5 °C (76.1 °F), and lowest in January, at around 2.3 °C (36.1 °F). The highest temperature ever recorded in Yufu was 35.9 °C (96.6 °F) on 10 August 2013; the coldest temperature ever recorded was −13.2 °C (8.2 °F) on 3 February 2012.

Climate data for Yufuin, Yufu (1991−2020 normals, extremes 1977−present)
Month	Jan	Feb	Mar	Apr	May	Jun	Jul	Aug	Sep	Oct	Nov	Dec	Year
Record high °C (°F)	19.6 (67.3)	23.5 (74.3)	24.5 (76.1)	28.3 (82.9)	31.7 (89.1)	32.5 (90.5)	35.7 (96.3)	35.9 (96.6)	33.2 (91.8)	29.9 (85.8)	26.1 (79.0)	21.8 (71.2)	35.9 (96.6)
Mean daily maximum °C (°F)	7.3 (45.1)	9.0 (48.2)	12.9 (55.2)	18.5 (65.3)	23.0 (73.4)	25.2 (77.4)	29.1 (84.4)	29.8 (85.6)	26.0 (78.8)	21.0 (69.8)	15.5 (59.9)	9.7 (49.5)	18.9 (66.1)
Daily mean °C (°F)	2.3 (36.1)	3.4 (38.1)	6.8 (44.2)	11.9 (53.4)	16.8 (62.2)	20.4 (68.7)	24.2 (75.6)	24.5 (76.1)	20.7 (69.3)	15.0 (59.0)	9.4 (48.9)	4.1 (39.4)	13.3 (55.9)
Mean daily minimum °C (°F)	−2.2 (28.0)	−1.6 (29.1)	1.1 (34.0)	5.5 (41.9)	10.9 (51.6)	16.3 (61.3)	20.3 (68.5)	20.4 (68.7)	16.5 (61.7)	9.9 (49.8)	4.1 (39.4)	−0.8 (30.6)	8.4 (47.1)
Record low °C (°F)	−12.3 (9.9)	−13.2 (8.2)	−10.1 (13.8)	−4.9 (23.2)	−0.6 (30.9)	5.8 (42.4)	10.7 (51.3)	12.0 (53.6)	3.8 (38.8)	−1.6 (29.1)	−5.2 (22.6)	−9.9 (14.2)	−13.2 (8.2)
Average precipitation mm (inches)	59.2 (2.33)	76.1 (3.00)	109.6 (4.31)	121.5 (4.78)	153.4 (6.04)	362.9 (14.29)	355.2 (13.98)	240.9 (9.48)	264.6 (10.42)	117.3 (4.62)	76.1 (3.00)	55.4 (2.18)	1,992.2 (78.43)
Average precipitation days (≥ 1.0 mm)	7.8	9.2	11.8	10.3	9.6	14.8	13.7	12.0	11.6	8.1	8.4	7.9	125.2
Mean monthly sunshine hours	108.8	122.1	151.1	176.1	185.5	118.5	141.2	155.4	118.7	145.8	128.3	114.5	1,665.9
Source: Japan Meteorological Agency

=== Demographics ===
Per Japanese census data, the population of Yufu in 2020 is 32,772 people. Yufu has been conducting censuses since 1920.

Historical population
Year	Pop.	±%
1960	39,956	—
1965	37,102	−7.1%
1970	33,804	−8.9%
1975	32,994	−2.4%
1980	34,708	+5.2%
1985	35,945	+3.6%
1990	35,119	−2.3%
1995	34,773	−1.0%
2000	35,248	+1.4%
2005	35,386	+0.4%
2010	34,708	−1.9%
2015	34,262	−1.3%
2020	32,772	−4.3%
Yufu population statistics

== History ==
The area of Yufu was part of ancient Bungo Province. From the Heian period, the area was dominated by descendants of the kokushi of the province, the Ogami clan. After the Kamakura period, the Ogami frequently clashed with the Kamakura shogunate-appointed shugo, the Ōtomo clan; however in the Sengoku period both clans joined forces to fight the invading Shimazu clan. During the Edo period, the area was largely under the control of Oka Domain. Following the Meiji restoration, the villages of Kitayufu and Minamiyufu within Hayami District, Ōita were established on May 1, 1889 with the creation of the modern municipalities system. The two villages merged to form Yufuin Village on April 1, 1936, which was raised to town status on April 1, 1948. The city of Yufu was established on October 1, 2005, from the merger of the towns of Hasama, Shōnai, and Yufuin (all from Ōita District).

=== Timeline ===
- 1889: Villages Anan, Higashishōnai, Nishishōnai, Minamishōnai, Asono, Tani, Yufugawa, Yunohira, Iwakigawa, and Hasama are created in Ōita District. Kitayufu, Minamiyufu, and Yunohira are created in Hayami District.
- 1899: Yunohira village is moved to Ōita District.
- 1936: Minamiyufu and Kitayufu are merged, creating Yufuin village.
- 1948: Yufuin village is renamed Yufuin town.
- 1950: Yufuin town is moved to Ōita District.
- 1954: Hasama, Tani, Yufugawa, and Iwakigawa is merged, now named Hasama village. A month later, Anan, Asono, Higashishōnai, Minamishōnai, and Nishishōnai are united. It is named Shōnai village.
- 1955: Yufuin and Yunohira are merged. The new town is named Yufuin, but the character for "Yu" is different from the one before. In the same year, Shōnai village is renamed Shōnai town and Hasama village is renamed Hasama town.
- 2005: Hasama, Shōnai, and Yufuin are united, the new city named Yufu.

== Government ==
Yufu has a mayor-council form of government with a directly elected mayor and a unicameral city council of 20 members. Yufu contributes two members to the Ōita Prefectural Assembly. In terms of national politics, the city is part of the Ōita 2nd district of the lower house of the Diet of Japan.

== Economy ==
The economy of Yufu is centered around agriculture and tourism it is many hot spring resorts.

== Education ==
Yufu has ten public elementary schools and three public junior high schools operated by the city government, and one public high school operated by the Ōita Prefectural Board of Education. The prefecture operates one special education school for the handicapped.

== Transportation ==
=== Railways ===
JR Kyushu - Kyūdai Main Line

- Yufuin - Minami-Yufu - Yunohira - Shōnai - Tenjinyama - Onoya - Onigase - Mukainoharu

=== Highways ===
- Ōita Expressway
- Higashikyushu Expressway
- National Route 210

== Local attractions ==
- Hasama Onsen
- Keisen Gorge
- Lake Kinrinko
- Shonai Onsen
- Taishogun Park
- Tsukahara Onsen
- Yufu River Gorge
- Yufuin Onsen
- Yunohira Onsen
