= Saganoseki, Ōita =

Dissolved municipality in Ōita prefecture, Japan

Saganoseki (佐賀関, Saganoseki) is a subdivision of Ōita city, Ōita Prefecture, Japan. Before being merged into Ōita city in 2005, Saganoseki was a town located in the former Kitaamabe District.

== Population ==
As of 2003, the town had an estimated population of 12,367 and the density of 250.39 persons per km^{2}. The total area was 49.39 km^{2}.

== History ==
On January 1, 2005, Saganoseki, along with the town of Notsuharu (from Kitaamabe District), was merged with the expanded city of Ōita.
