= Yufuin, Ōita =

District in Yufu, Ōita Prefecture, Japan

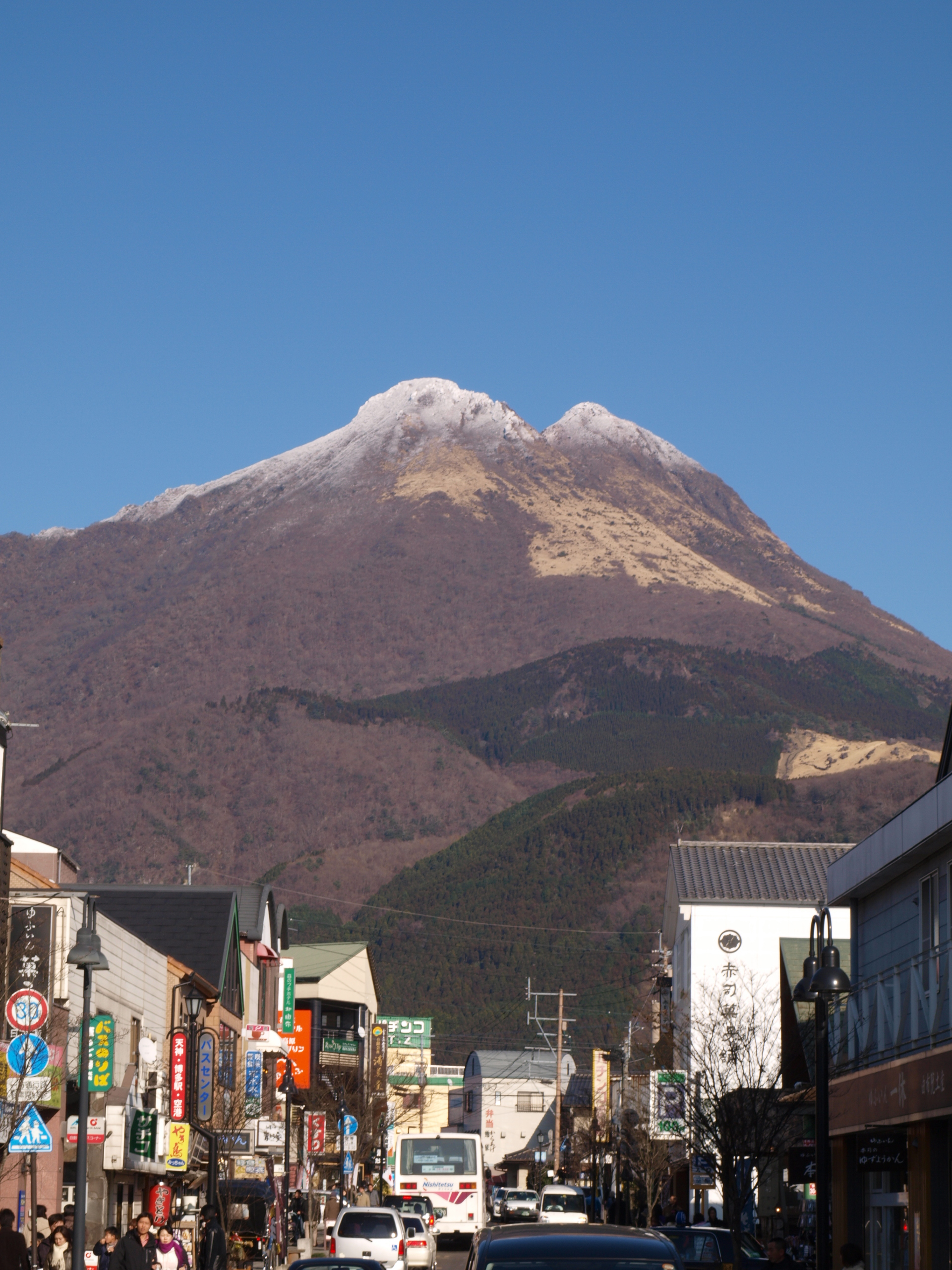
Mount Yufu (由布岳, Yufudake) as viewed from Yufuin

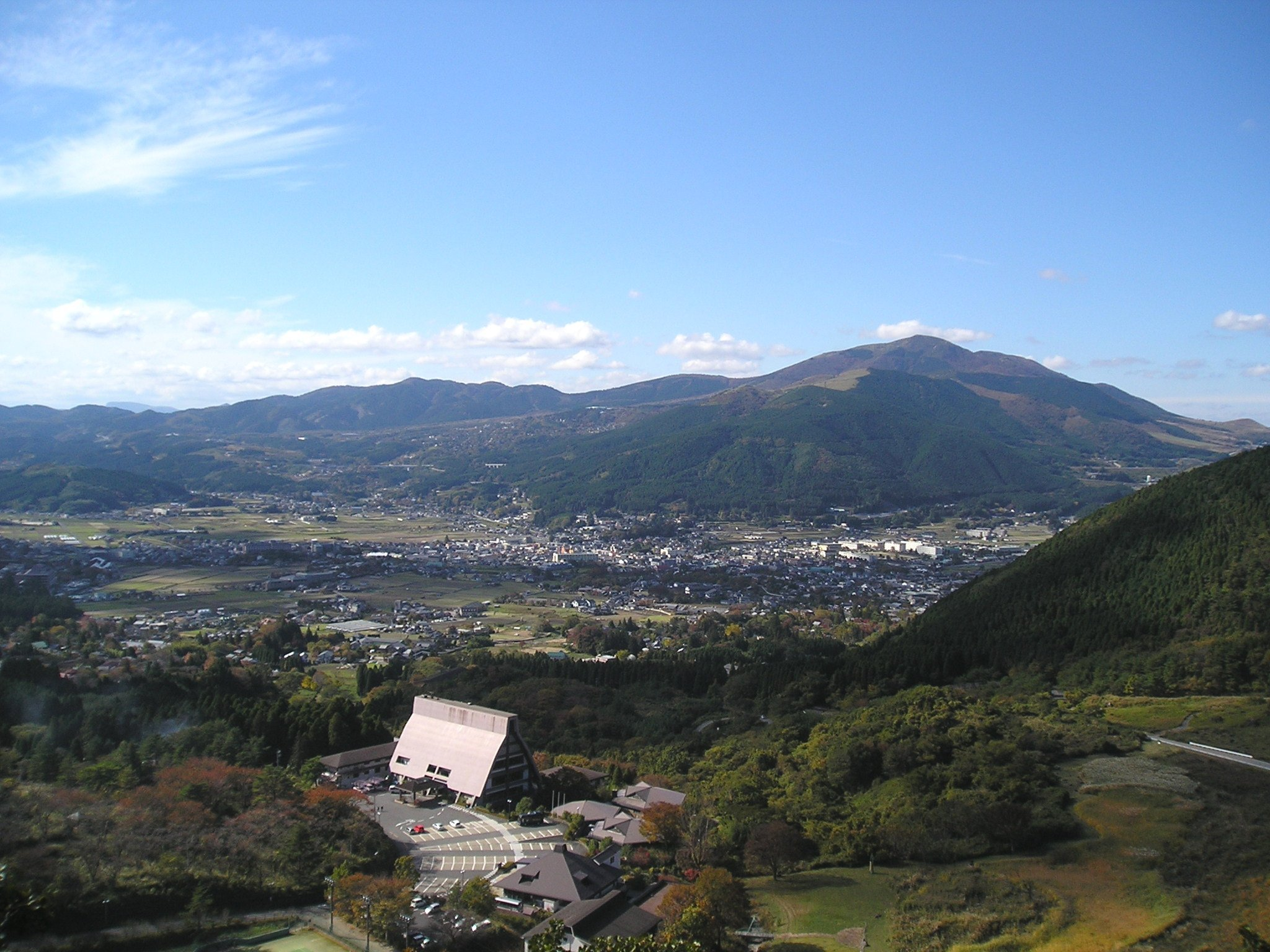
Yufuin panorama

Yufuin (湯布院町, Yufuin-chō) is a district (町, machi) within the city of Yufu, Ōita Prefecture, Japan. It was previously a town located in the now-dissolved Ōita District. Yufuin's elevation is approximately 400 meters (1,300 ft) above ground.

As of 2003, the town had an estimated population of 11,342 and density of 88.77 inhabitants per square kilometer (229.9/sq mi). The total area was 127.77 km^{2} (49.33 sq mi).

On October 1, 2005, Yufuin, along with the towns of Hasama and Shonai (all from Ōita District), were merged to create the city of Yufu. This controversial decision resulted in the recall of the mayor and a snap election in which he regained office.

== See also ==
- Municipal mergers and dissolutions in Japan
- Mergers and dissolutions in Oita-ken
