= Japan National Route 210 =

Road in Japan

National Route 210
- 国道210号
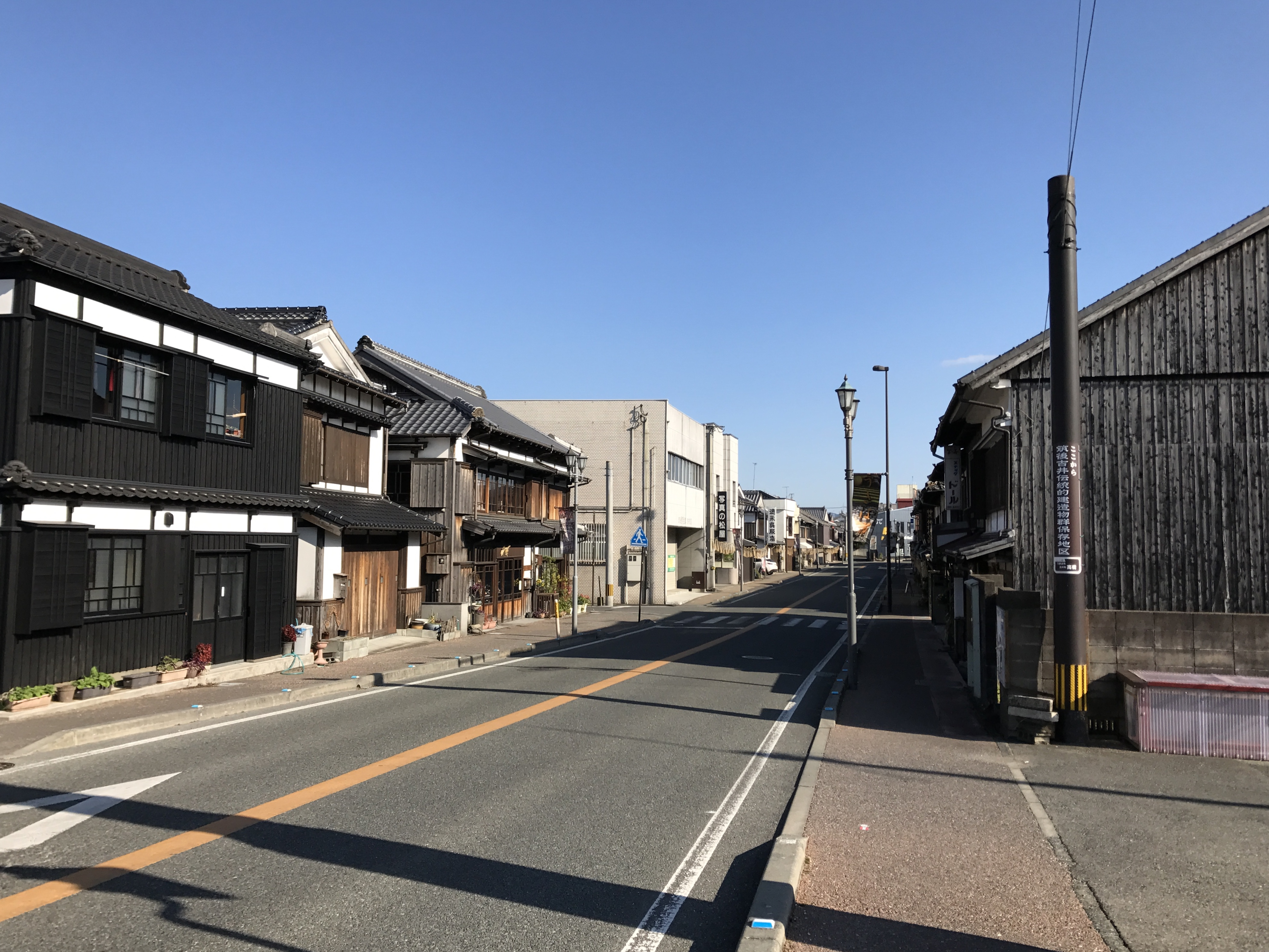

Route information
- Length: 136.2 km (84.6 mi)
- Existed: 18 May 1953–present

Major junctions
- West end: National Route 3 in Kurume
- East end: National Route 10 in Ōita

Location
- Country: Japan

Highway system
- National highways of Japan; Expressways of Japan
← National Route 209	→ National Route 211

National Route 210 is a national highway of Japan connecting Kurume and Ōita in Japan, with a total length of 136.2 km (84.63 mi).

The highway passes through the cities of Kurume and Ukiha in Fukuoka Prefecture, and also Hita, Kusu, Yufuin and Yufu in Ōita Prefecture, before ending in Ōita. It runs roughly parallel to Kyūdai Main Line, a JR Kyushu railway line between Kurume and Ōita, and Ōita Expressway, which the route directly connects to via Yufuin IC in Yufuin.
