= Hasama, Ōita =

Dissolved municipality in Ōita prefecture, Japan

Hasama (挾間町, Hasama-machi) was a town located in Ōita District, Ōita Prefecture, Japan.

As of 2003, the town had an estimated population of 15,083 and the density of 295.17 persons per km^{2}. The total area was 51.10 km^{2}.

On October 1, 2005, Hasama, along with the towns of Shōnai and Yufuin (all from Ōita District), was merged to create the city of Yufu.
