= Shōnai, Ōita =

Dissolved municipality in Ōita prefecture, Japan

Shōnai (庄内町, Shōnai-chō) was a town located in Ōita District, Ōita Prefecture, Japan.

As of 1 June 2005, the town had an estimated population of 9,586 and the density of 68.33 persons per km^{2}. The total area was 140.29 km^{2}.

On October 1, 2005, Shōnai, along with the towns of Hasama and Yufuin (all from Ōita District), was merged to create the city of Yufu.
