= Kusumyō-Shigesada Kofun =

- 楠名・重定古墳 (Japanese)
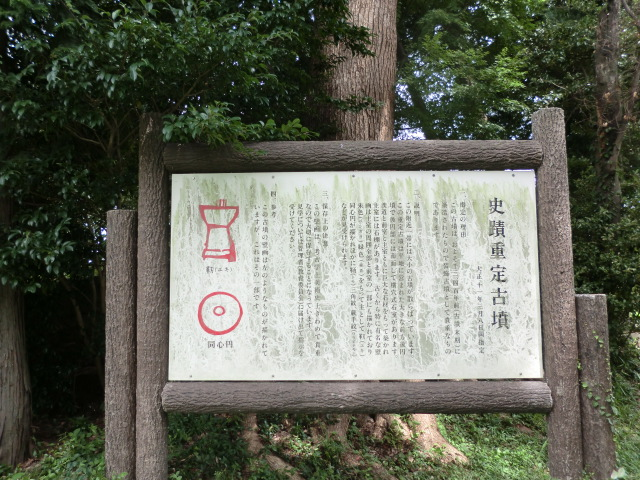
- Shigesada Kofun sign

- Kusumyō-Shigesada Kofun Kusumyō-Shigesada Kofun (Japan)
- Interactive map of Kusumyō-Shigesada Kofun
- 33°19′57″N 130°47′40″E
- Type: Kofun cluster
- Periods: Kofun period
- Location: Ukiha, Fukuoka, Japan
- Region: Kyushu

History
- Built: c.6th to 7th century

Site notes
- Public access: Yes (no facilities)

The Kusumyō-Shigesada Kofun (楠名・重定古墳) is a pair of Kofun period burial mounds, located in the Asada neighborhood of the city of Ukiha, Fukuoka Prefecture Japan. The tumulus pair was designated a National Historic Site of Japan in 1922.

== Overview ==
The Kusumyō-Shigesada Kofun are part of the Asada Kofun Cluster, located at the tip of the alluvial fan on the south bank of the Chikugo River, at the foot of Mt. Minou. This area has many decorated kofun, including the Tsukahanazuka Kofun.

The Kusumyō Kofun is a two-tiered enpun (円墳)-style circular tomb with a diameter of approximately 32 meters and a height of 6 meters. The burial chamber is a horizontal-entry cave-style stone chamber that opens to the south, with the front chamber larger than the back chamber, and is thought to have been built in the early 7th century.

The Shigesada Kofun is a zenpō-kōen-fun (前方後円墳), which is shaped like a keyhole, having one square end and one circular end, when viewed from above. It has total length of approximately 51 meters, with a posterior circular portion diameter of approximately 44 meters, and height of 8.5 meters. it is believed to have been built in the latter half of the 6th century. The anterior portion has largely been lost, but the total length at the time of construction is estimated to be about 80 meters.The interior is a horizontal-entry stone burial chamber that opens almost to the south, with a total length of 17 meters made of large andesite monoliths. It is connected to the outside by a six meter long corridor. Decorative murals are on the walls, and although they have faded now, they use two colors, red and green, to create geometric patterns such as concentric circular patterns and warabi fern patterns, as well as archery patterns depicting fletching, wristguard and quivers. The pattern composition is different between the rear chamber and the front chamber. The Edo period kokugaku scholar Hirata Atsutane interpreted this pattern as an ancient script, which he named Tsukushi moji (筑紫文字).

Historical records indicate that a large amount of grave goods could be found in this tumulus, but all have been lost to robbery. The interior of the tumulus was used as an air raid shelter during World War II and was visited by large numbers of people during the post-war archeology boom, causing much damage to the preservations of the murals.

The tumulus is about a ten-minute walk from Ukiha Station on the JR Kyushu Kyūdai Main Line.

== See also ==
- List of Historic Sites of Japan (Fukuoka)
- Decorated kofun
