= Mii Station =

Railway station in Kurume, Fukuoka Prefecture, Japan

Mii Station 御井駅
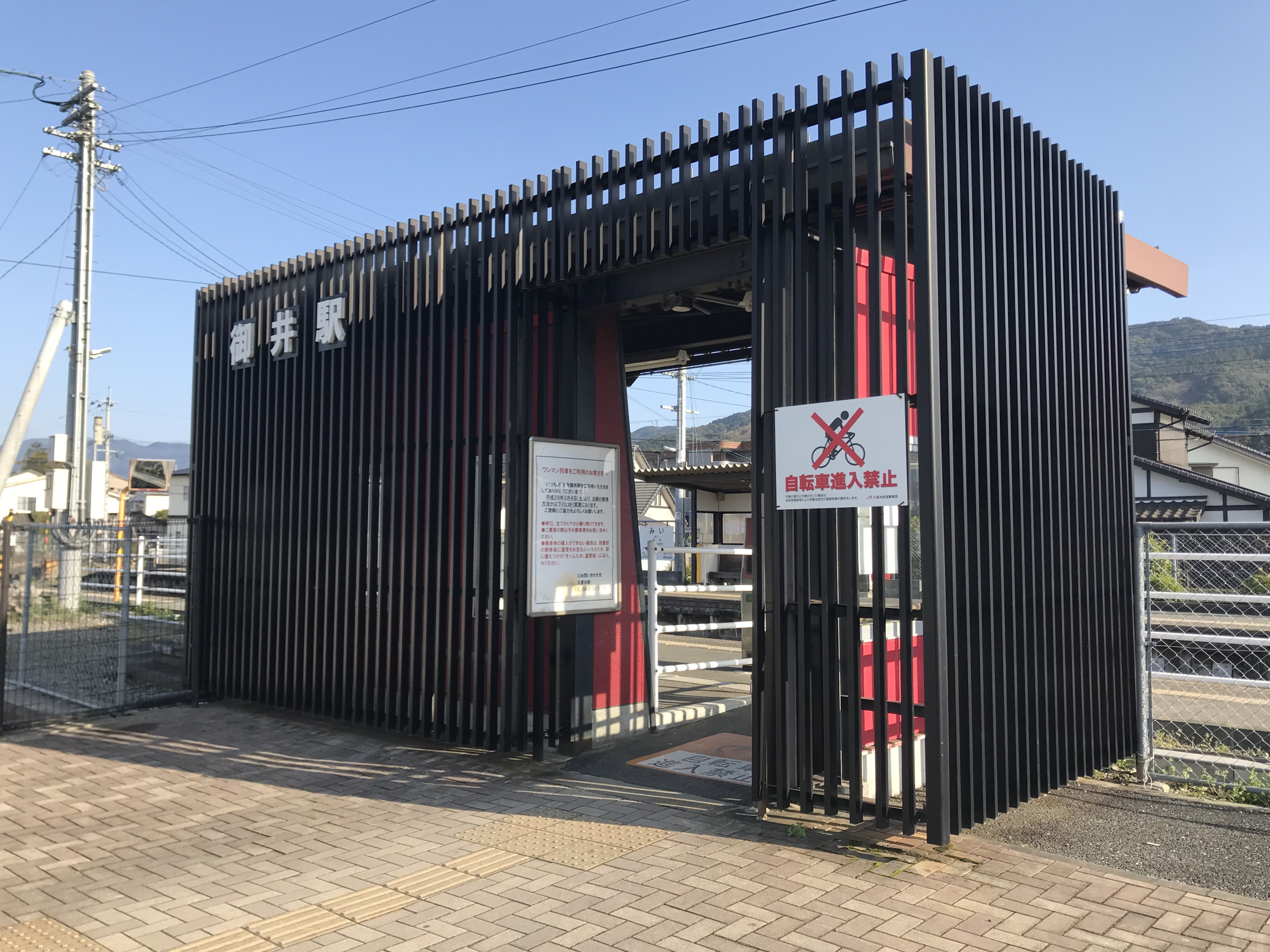
- Mii Station in 2018

General information
- Location: 5-10 Miihatasaki, Kurume-shi, Fukuoka-ken 839-0851; Japan
- Coordinates: 33°18′46″N 130°33′45″E
- Operator: JR Kyushu
- Line: Kyūdai Main Line
- Distance: 8.0 km (5.0 mi) from Kurume
- Platforms: 2 side platforms
- Tracks: 2

Construction
- Structure type: Low embankment
- Accessible: yes

Other information
- Status: Unstaffed
- Website: Official website

History
- Opened: 24 December 1928

Passengers
- FY2015: 265 daily

Services
Preceding station	JR Kyushu	Following station
Kurume-Daigakumae towards Kurume	Kyūdai Main Line	Zendōji towards Ōita
Location
- Location within Fukuoka Prefecture Location within Japan

Mii Station (御井駅, Mii-eki) is a passenger railway station located in the city of Kurume, Fukuoka Prefecture, Japan. It is operated by JR Kyushu.

== Lines ==
The station is served by the Kyudai Main Line and is located 8.0 km from the starting point of the line at Kurume. Only local trains on the line stop at the station.

== Layout ==
The station consists of two side platforms serving two tracks on a low embankment. The station building is a shed of simple modern design and is unstaffed, serving only to house a waiting area and an automatic ticket vending machine. Access to the opposite side platform is by means of a level crossing with ramps.

=== Platforms ===
1	■ ■Kyūdai Main Line	for Hita
2	■ ■ Kyūdai Main Line	for Kurume

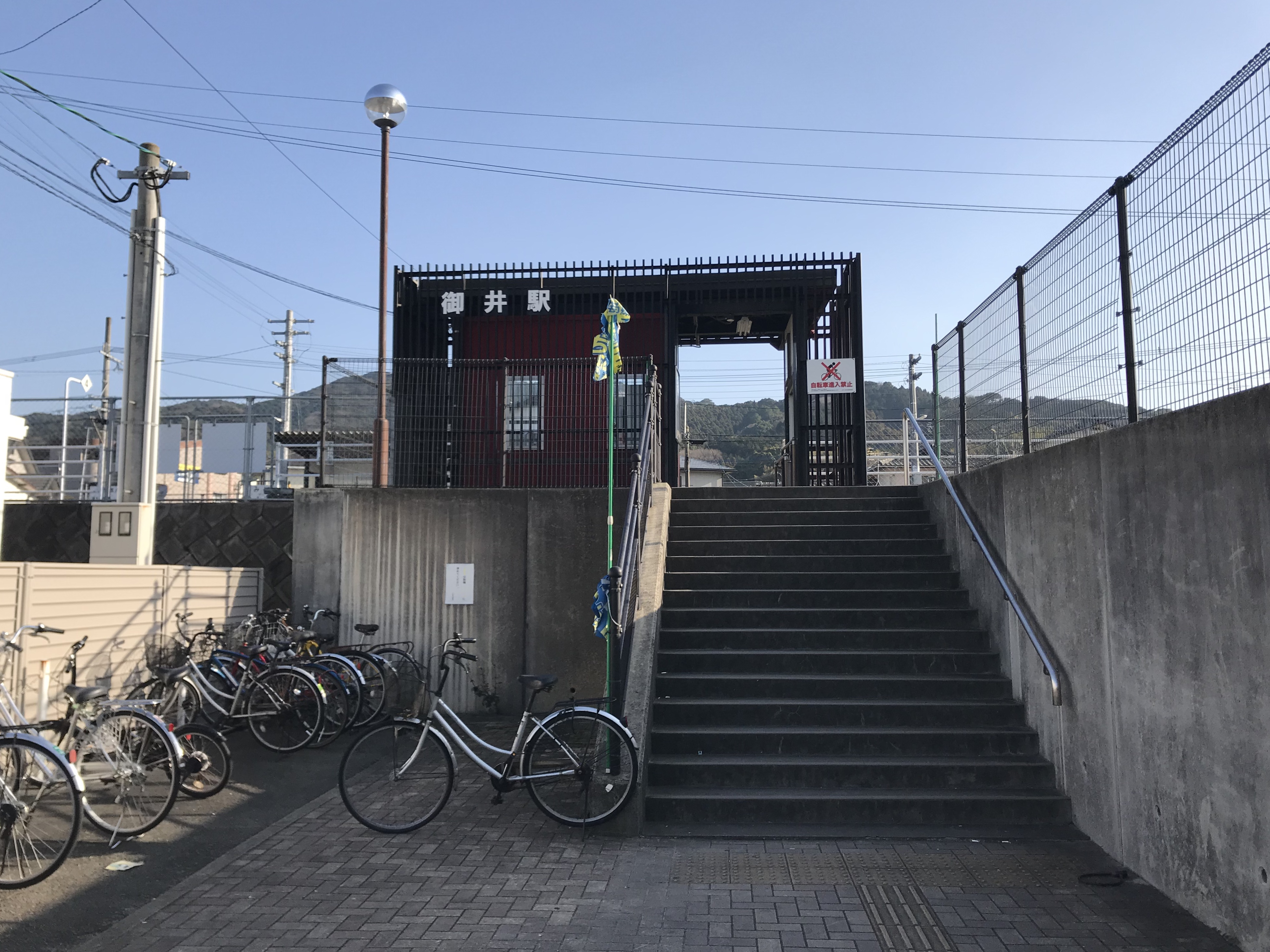
Entrance of Mii Station.

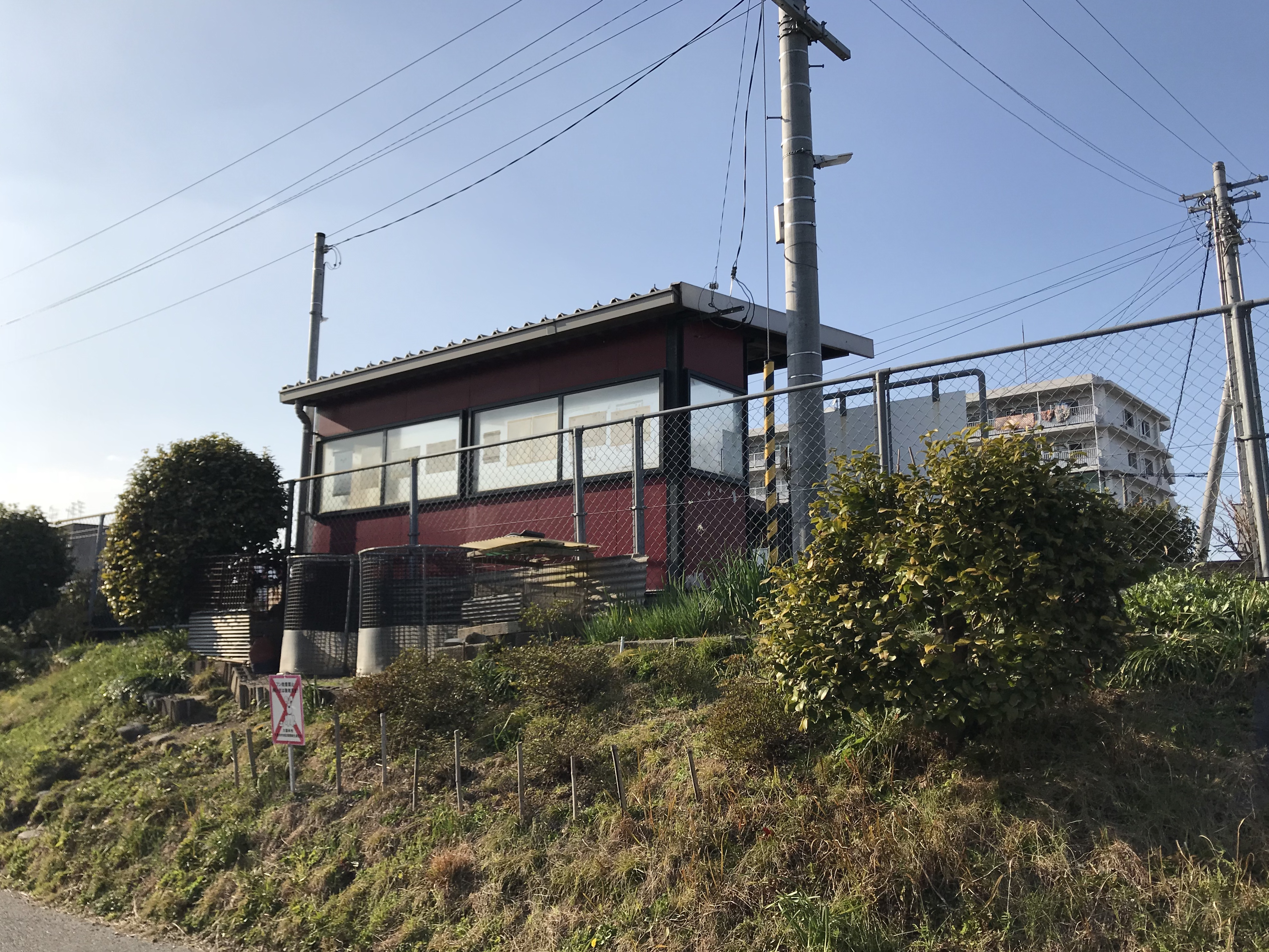
A view of the station from the north side, showing the embankment. The structure is the weather shelter for platform 2.

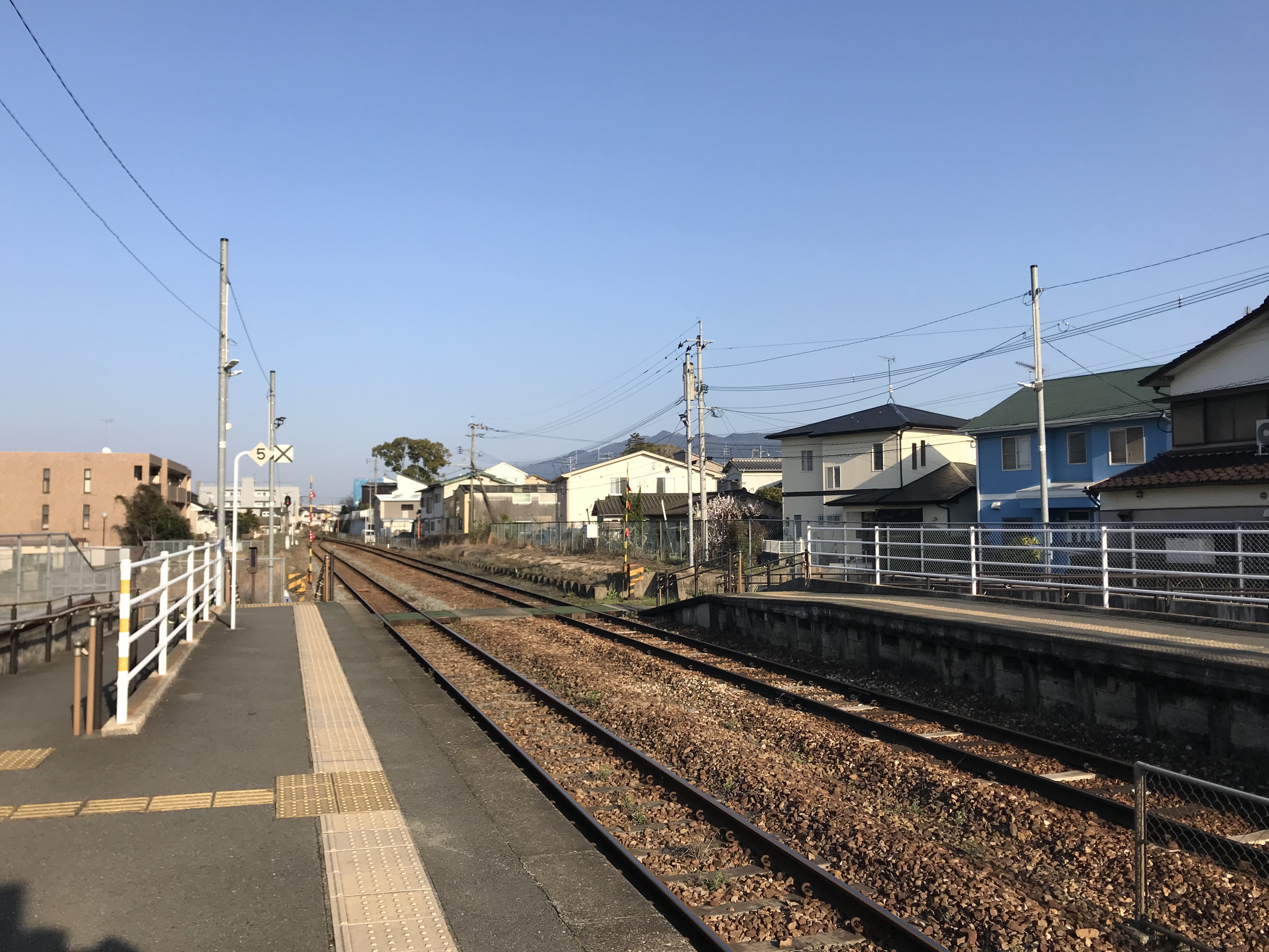
A view from platform 1 with platform 2 to the right. The level crossing can be seen in the background.

== History ==
Japanese Government Railways (JGR) opened a track from Kurume to Chikugo-Yoshii on 24 December 1928 during the first phase of the construction of the Kyudai Main Line. Mii was opened on the same day as one of several intermediate stations on the track. With the privatization of Japanese National Railways (JNR), the successor of JGR, on 1 April 1987, JR Kyushu took over control of the station.

== Passenger statistics ==
In fiscal 2015, there were 97,000 boarding passengers (in rounded thousands), giving a daily average of 265 passengers.

== Surrounding area ==
- Kyushu Safety and Health Technology Center
- Mizuno Fault - Near this station, the train runs right next to the fissure, although it is only a short distance away.
- Fukuoka Prefectural Kurume Chikusui High School

== See also ==
- List of railway stations in Japan
