= Zendōji Station =

Railway station in Kurume, Fukuoka Prefecture, Japan

Zendōji Station 善導寺駅
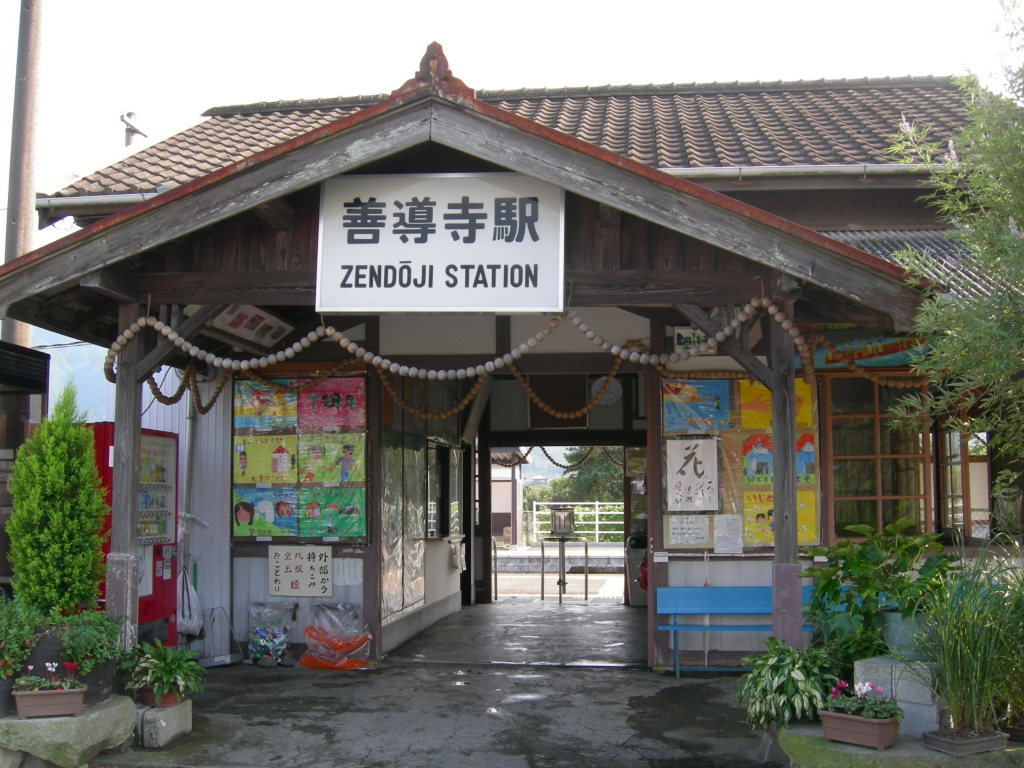
- Zendōji Station in 2006

General information
- Location: 319 Iida Zendojimachi, Kurume-shi, Fukuoka-ken 839-0824; Japan
- Coordinates: 33°19′12″N 130°36′32″E
- Operator: JR Kyushu
- Line: Kyūdai Main Line
- Distance: 12.6 km from Kurume
- Platforms: 2 side platforms
- Tracks: 2 + 1 siding

Construction
- Structure type: At grade
- Accessible: No - platforms linked by footbridge

Other information
- Status: Unstaffed
- Website: Official website

History
- Opened: 24 December 1928

Passengers
- FY2015: 301 daily

Services
Preceding station	JR Kyushu	Following station
Mii towards Kurume	Kyūdai Main Line	Chikugo-Kusano towards Ōita
Location
- Location within Fukuoka Prefecture Location within Japan

Zendōji Station (善導寺駅, Zendōji-eki) is a passenger railway station located in the city of Kurume, Fukuoka Prefecture, Japan. It is operated by JR Kyushu.

== Lines ==
The station is served by the Kyudai Main Line and is located 12.6 km (7.8 mi) from the starting point of the line at Kurume. Only local trains on the line stop at the station.

== Layout ==
The station consists of two side platforms serving two tracks at grade. A siding branches off track 1. The station building is a wooden structure of traditional Japanese design. The ticket window is unstaffed and the building serves only to house a waiting area. A Sugoca card reader is available. Access to the opposite side platform is by means of a footbridge.

=== Platforms ===
1	■ ■Kyūdai Main Line	for Hita
2	■ ■ Kyūdai Main Line	for Kurume

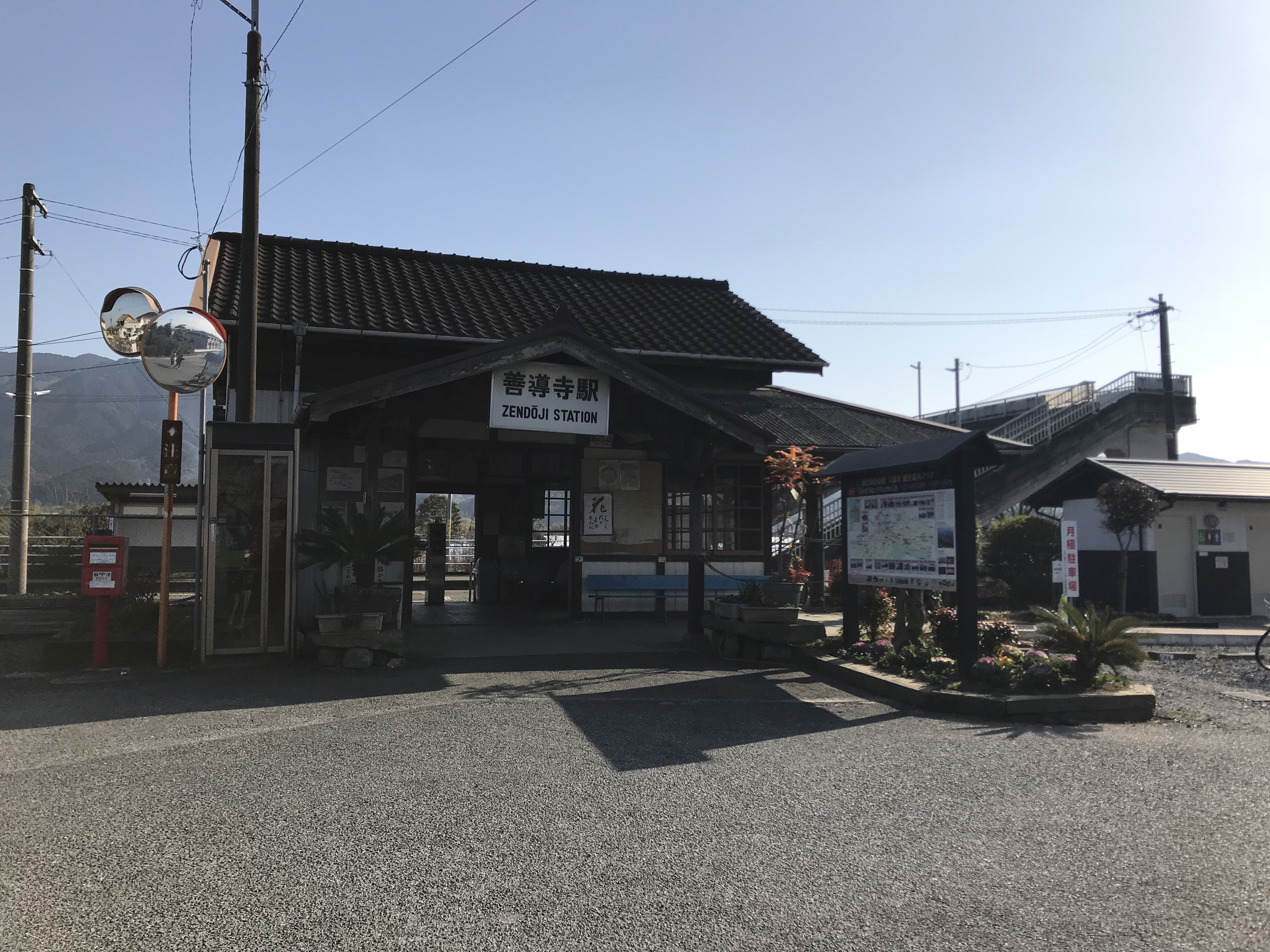
A view of the station forecourt.

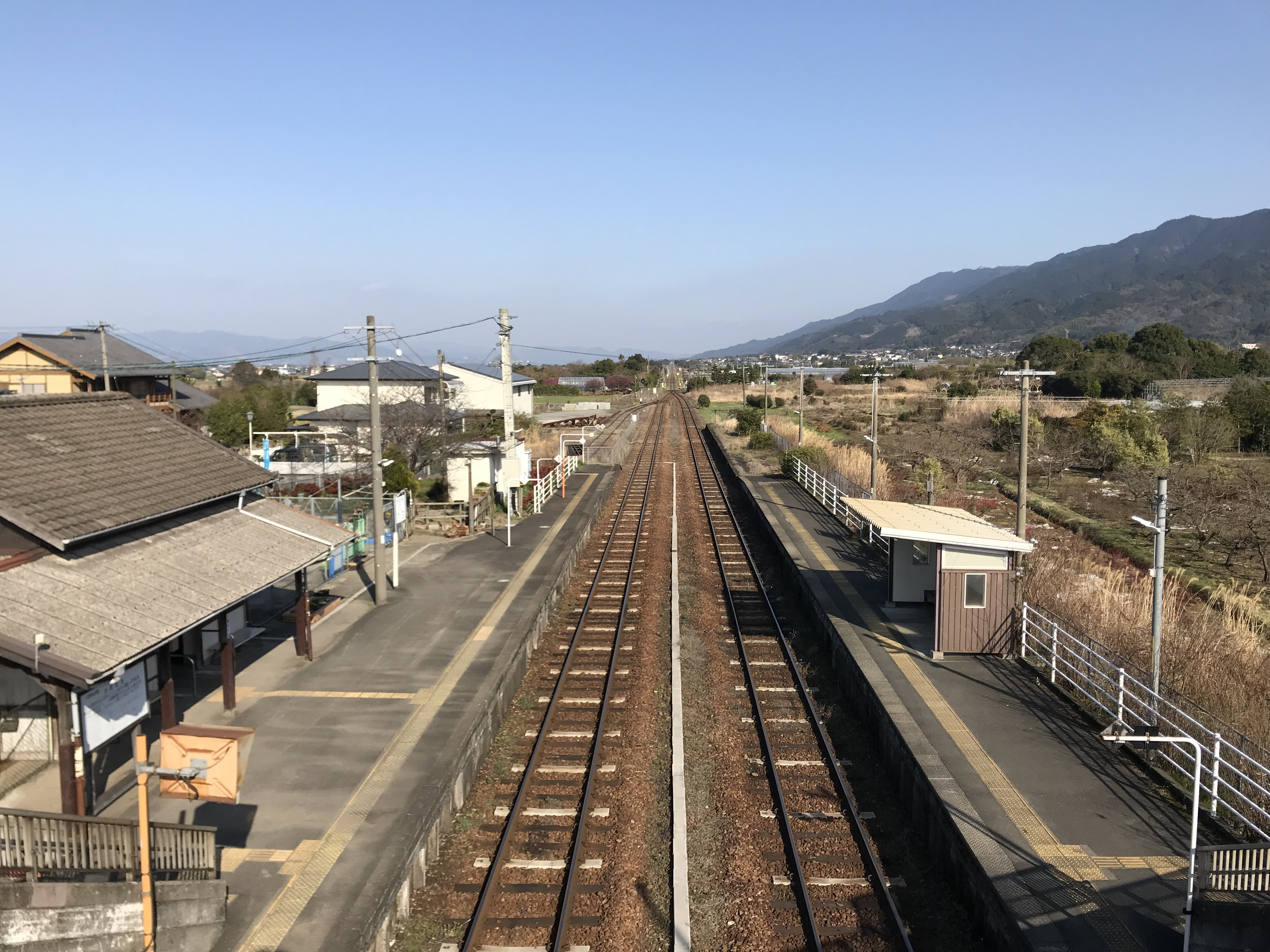
A view of the platforms and tracks, looking east. The siding can be seen in the distance.

== History ==
Japanese Government Railways (JGR) opened a track from Kurume to Chikugo-Yoshii on 24 December 1928 during the first phase of the construction of the Kyudai Main Line. Zendōji was opened on the same day as one of several intermediate stations on the track. With the privatization of Japanese National Railways (JNR), the successor of JGR, on 1 April 1987, JR Kyushu took over control of the station.

== Passenger statistics ==
In fiscal 2015, there were 110,000 boarding passengers (in rounded thousands), giving a daily average of 301 passengers.

== Surrounding area ==
- Zendoji - Head temple of the Jodo sect.
- Kurume City Byosui Junior High School

== See also ==
- List of railway stations in Japan
