= Chikugo-Kusano Station =

Railway station in Kurume, Fukuoka Prefecture, Japan

Chikugo-Kusano Station 筑後草野駅
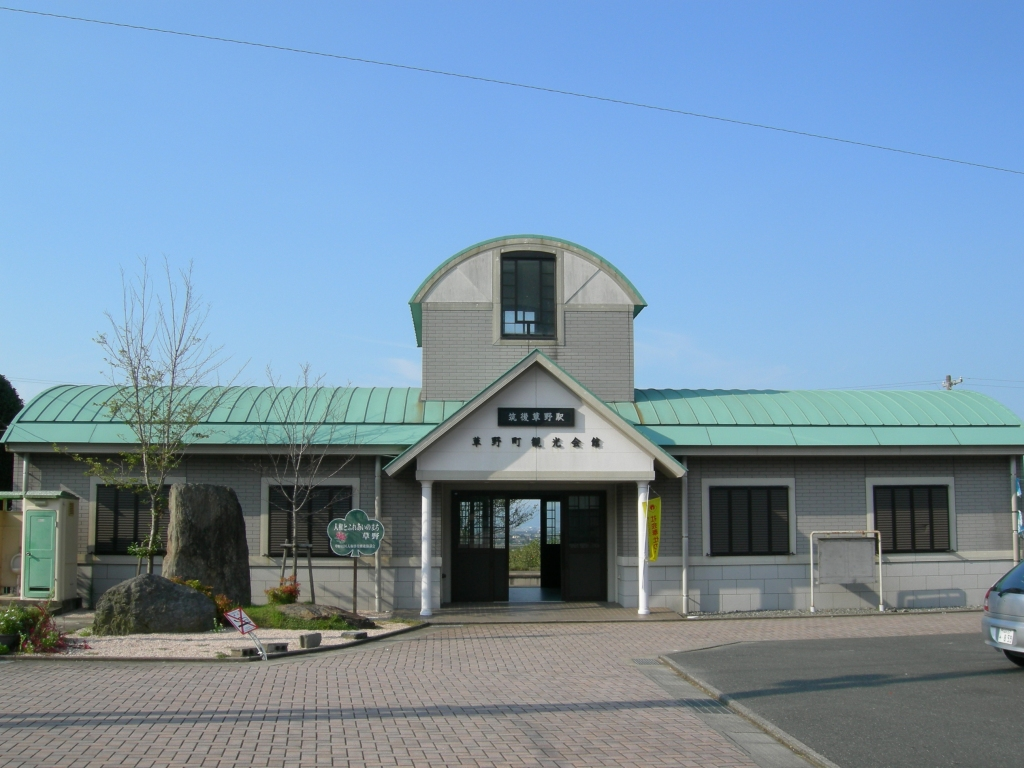
- Chikugo-Kusano Station in 2006

General information
- Location: Kotobayashi, Kusanomachi, Kurume-shi, Fukuoka-ken 839-0834; Japan
- Coordinates: 33°19′19″N 130°38′32″E
- Operator: JR Kyushu
- Line: Kyūdai Main Line
- Distance: 15.7 km (9.8 mi) from Kurume
- Platforms: 2 side platforms
- Tracks: 2

Construction
- Structure type: At grade

Other information
- Status: Unstaffed
- Website: Official website

History
- Opened: 24 December 1928; 97 years ago

Passengers
- FY2016: 241 daily

Services
Preceding station	JR Kyushu	Following station
Zendōji towards Kurume	Kyūdai Main Line	Tanushimaru towards Ōita
Location
- Location within Fukuoka Prefecture Location within Japan

Chikugo-Kusano Station (筑後草野駅, Chikugo-Kusano-eki) is a passenger railway station located in the city of Kurume, Fukuoka Prefecture, Japan. It is operated by JR Kyushu.

== Lines ==
The station is served by the Kyudai Main Line and is located 15.7 km from the starting point of the line at Kurume. Only local trains on the line stop at the station.

== Layout ==
The station consists of two side platforms serving two tracks at grade. The station building is of modern design and the station facilities are co-located with a local tourism organisation. The station building is unstaffed and serves only to house a waiting area. Access to the opposite side platform is by means of a level crossing.

=== Platforms ===
1	■ ■Kyūdai Main Line	for Kurume
2	■ ■ Kyūdai Main Line	for Hita

== History ==
Japanese Government Railways (JGR) opened a track from Kurume to Chikugo-Yoshii on 24 December 1928 during the first phase of the construction of the Kyudai Main Line. Chikugo-Kusano was opened on the same day as one of several intermediate stations on the track. With the privatization of Japanese National Railways (JNR), the successor of JGR, on 1 April 1987, JR Kyushu took over control of the station.

== Passenger statistics ==
In fiscal 2015, there were 44,000 boarding passengers (in rounded thousands), giving a daily average of 121 passengers.

== Surrounding area ==
- Kurume City Kusano History Museum (former Kusano Bank Head Office, Nationally Registered Tangible Cultural Property)
- Yamabemichi Cultural Center (former Nakano Hospital medical treatment and warehouse, nationally registered tangible cultural property)

== See also ==
- List of railway stations in Japan
