= Hinooka Kofun =

- 日岡古墳 (Japanese)
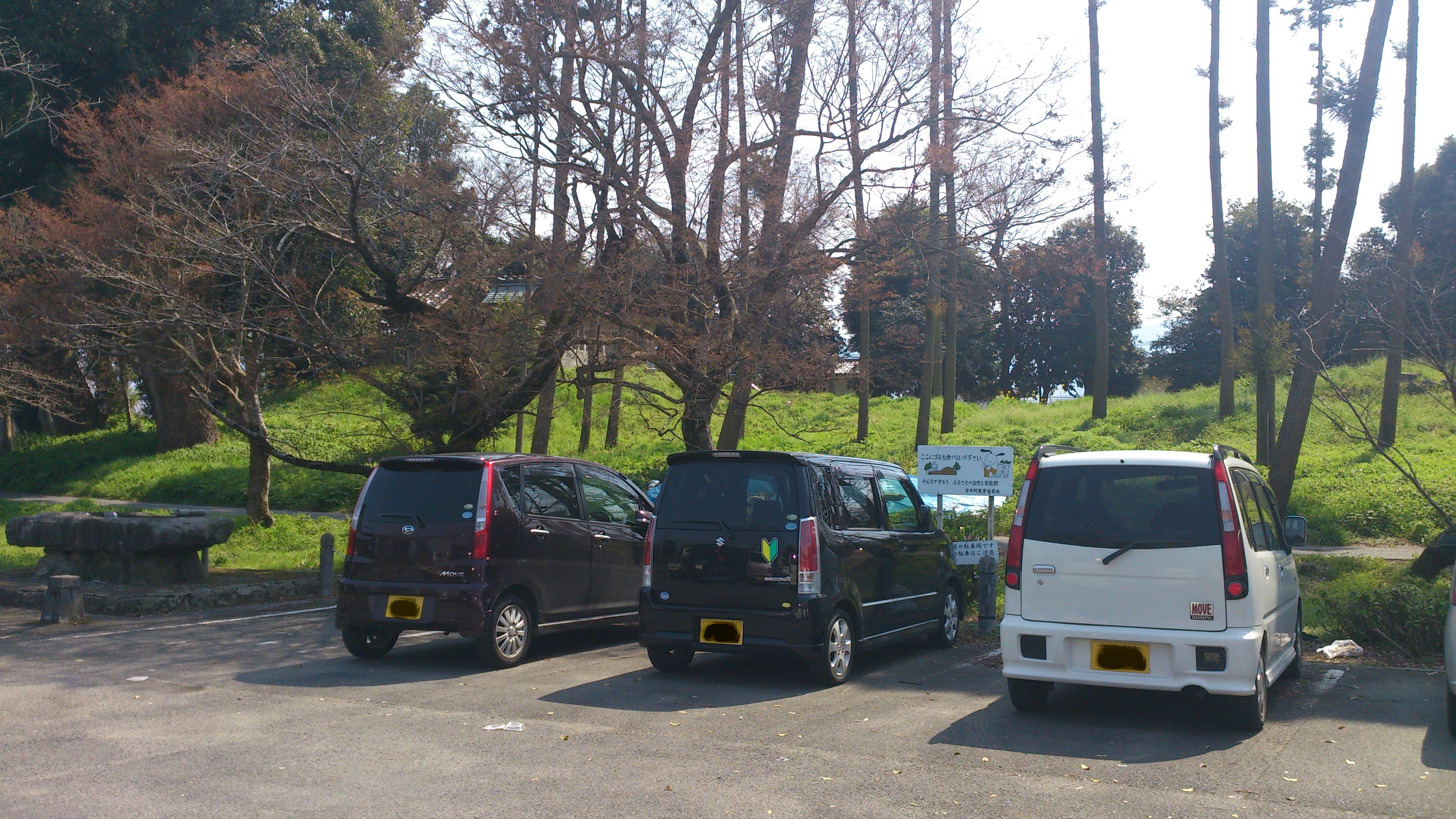
- Hinooka Kofun

- Hinooka Kofun Hinooka Kofun (Japan)
- Interactive map of Hinooka Kofun
- 33°20′40″N 130°46′02″E
- Type: Kofun
- Periods: Kofun period
- Location: Ukiha, Fukuoka, Japan
- Region: Kyushu

History
- Built: c.6th century

Site notes
- Public access: Yes (no facilities)

The Hinooka Kofun (日岡古墳) is a Kofun period burial mound, located in the Yoshii neighborhood of the city of Ukiha, Fukuoka Prefecture Japan. The tumulus was designated a National Historic Site of Japan in 1928. Together with the nearby Tsukioka Kofun and Tsukado Kofun, it forms the Wakamiya Kofun Cluster.

== Overview ==
The Hinooka Kofun is a zenpō-kōen-fun (前方後円墳), which is shaped like a keyhole, having one square end and one circular end, when viewed from above. It is located within the precincts of Wakamiya Hachiman Shrine along Fukuoka Prefectural Route 749, which runs through the alluvial plain on the south bank of the Chikugo River. It has a total length of 74 meters and a height of five meters and was surrounded by a moat. In the posterior circular portion has a diameter of 40 meters, and contains a horizontal passage stone burial chamber that opens to the southwest. The structure of the burial chamber is such that the side walls are tilted slightly inward, and on the back wall, a large monolith more than 2.2 meters wide and 1.9 meters high. It is a decorated kofun and the back wall has geometric patterns such as concentric circular patterns, warabi fern patterns, and triangular patterns in three colors of red, white, and green. The surrounding walls are painted with depictions of weapons, fish, ships, horses, shields, beasts, etc. in different colors covering almost the entire surface of the burial chamber. The tumulus is estimated that it was built in the first half of the 6th century, during the late Kofun period.

Related materials are on display at the Ukiha City Yoshii History and Folklore Museum. The tumulus is approximately a 20-minute walk from Chikugo-Yoshii Station on the JR Kyushu Kyūdai Main Line.

The tumulus is approximately 2.1 kilometers northeast of Chikugo-Yoshii Station on the JR Kyushu Kyūdai Main Line.

== See also ==
- List of Historic Sites of Japan (Fukuoka)
- Decorated kofun
