= Yakata Kofun Cluster =

- 屋形古墳群 (Japanese)
- Yakata Kofun Cluster Yakata Kofun Cluster (Japan)
- Interactive map of Yakata Kofun Cluster
- 33°19′49″N 130°44′18″E
- Type: Kofun cluster
- Periods: Kofun period
- Location: Ukiha, Fukuoka, Japan
- Region: Kyushu

Site notes
- Public access: Yes (no facilities)

The Yakata Kofun Cluster (屋形古墳群) is a group of Kofun period burial mounds, located in the Tominaga, Yoshii-cho neighborhood of the city of Ukiha, Fukuoka Prefecture Japan. The tumulus cluster was designated a National Historic Site of Japan in 1953, with the area under protection expanded in 1986 and in 2003.

== Overview ==
The Yakata Kofun Cluster consists of four decorated kofun: The Mezurashizuka Kofun (珍敷塚古墳), Torifunezuka Kofun (鳥船塚古墳), Furuhata Kofun (古畑古墳), and the Hara Kofun (原古墳). These tumuli are built on an alluvial fan at the northern foot of the Minou Mountain Range, at an elevation of 40 to 90 meters. All were enpun (円墳)-style round burial mounds: however only the Furuhata and Hara Kofun remain intact.

Mezurashizuka Kofun

The Mezurashizuka Kofun, located at the northern end of the cluster, just south of the prefectural road Ukihagusano Kurume Line. It was discovered in 1950, but it appears to have been demolished many years previous to this, and has only fragments of the back and right walls of its stone burial chamber remaining. The mural is located in a preservation facility and can be viewed by advance application to the Ukiha City Board of Education.The painting on the back wall uses red and blue pigments, and is composed of three colors that make use of the rock's surface. Four thick horizontal lines form a base, above which three quivers containing bows and arrows placed in the center. A warabi pattern is between the left and center quiver, and above the center quiver is a concentric circle pattern, and below is a gondola-shaped boat with a sail. It also depicts a figure wearing a crown holding an oar, and there is a bird perched on its bow. Above and to the right of the quiver is a figure holding a shield or a bow, and below that are two toads.One of the characteristics of this ancient mural is the extensive use of dots in addition to lines.

Hara Kofun

The Hara Kofun is located 110 meters south of the Mezurashizuka Kofun. It has a diameter of about 12.4 meters and a height of about 3.5 meters. The horizontal entry cave-style stone burial chamber with a total length of about 8.9 meters, and has red murals on the back stone and side walls. The mural on the back wall depicts a large ship with two large oars. It is manned by a figure operating an oar, along with a figure holding a bow, and a horse or a house containing a dead body.

Torifunezuka Kofun

The Torifunezuka Kofun is located approximately 135 meters south of the Hara Kofun. The burial chamber has been destroyed, and only two steps of the hip stones on the back wall remain. On the first step of the back wall, there are depictions of large shields, concentric circular patterns, ships, and beads. The ship is a large vessel with large oars, a person is on board, and there are two masts for the sails. On the second row, there is a picture of a bird perched on the ship's bow.

Furuhata Kofun

The Furuhata Kofun is located approximately 200 meters south of the Torifunezuka Kofun. It has a diameter of approximately 20 meters and a height of three meters. It was constructed in two stages, and lined with cylindrical haniwa. The back wall of the stone burial chamber is decorated with concentric circular patterns, triangular patterns, and human figures in red.

The site is approximately a 30-minute walk from Chikugo-Yoshii Station on the JR Kyushu Kyudai Main Line.

== See also ==
- List of Historic Sites of Japan (Fukuoka)
- Decorated kofun
