= Tanushimaru Station =

Railway station in Kurume, Fukuoka Prefecture, Japan

Tanushimaru Station 田主丸駅
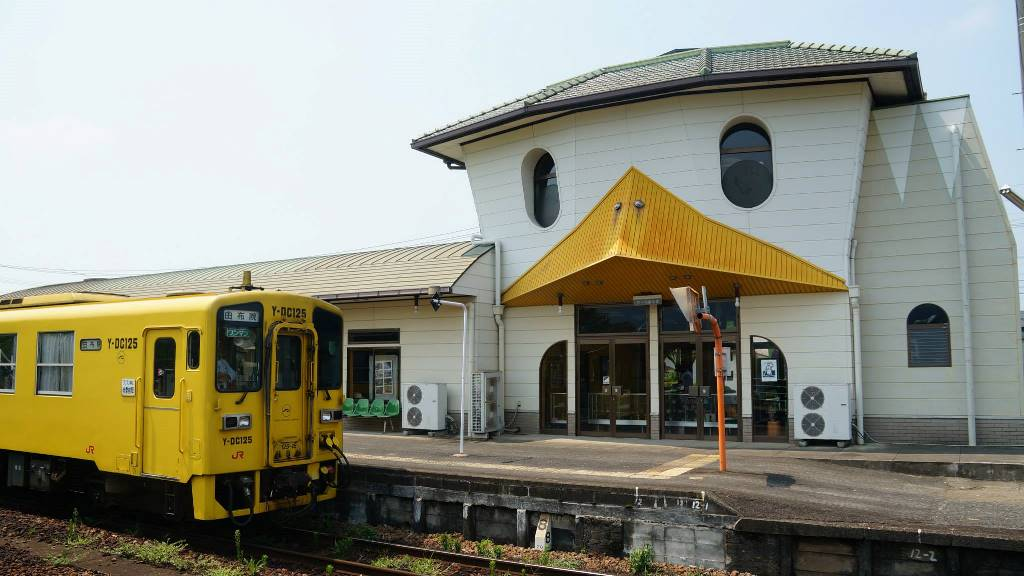
- Tanushimaru Station in 2013

General information
- Location: 2000 Tanushimarumachi, Tanushimaru, Kurume-shi, Fukuoka-ken 839-1233; Japan
- Coordinates: 33°20′20″N 130°41′32″E
- Operator: JR Kyushu
- Line: Kyūdai Main Line
- Distance: 20.8 km (12.9 mi) from Kurume
- Platforms: 2 side platforms
- Tracks: 2 + 1 siding

Construction
- Structure type: At grade
- Cycle facilities: Bike shed
- Accessible: No - platforms linked by footbridge

Other information
- Status: Kan'i itaku station
- Website: Official website

History
- Opened: 24 December 1928; 97 years ago

Passengers
- FY2021: 526 daily

Services
Preceding station	JR Kyushu	Following station
Chikugo-Kusano towards Kurume	Kyūdai Main Line	Chikugo-Yoshii towards Ōita
Location
- Location within Fukuoka Prefecture Location within Japan

Tanushimaru Station (田主丸駅, Tanushimaru-eki) is a passenger railway station located in the city of Kurume, Fukuoka Prefecture, Japan. It is operated by JR Kyushu. Tanushimaru is noted for having a section of the station building specially shaped to resemble the head and beak of a Kappa, an aquatic yōkai which is associated with the town.

== Lines ==
The station is served by the Kyudai Main Line and is located 20.8 km from the starting point of the line at Kurume. Only local trains on the line stop at the station.

== Layout ==
The station consists of two side platforms serving two tracks at grade. A siding branches off track 1. The station shares a building with a local tourism association and information centre. The tourism association also acts as a kan'i itaku agent and manages the ticket window which is equipped with a POS machine but does not have a Midori no Madoguchi facility. Access to the opposite side platform is by means of a footbridge. A bike shed is located at the station forecourt.

=== Platforms ===
1	■ ■Kyūdai Main Line	for Hita
2	■ ■ Kyūdai Main Line	for Kurume

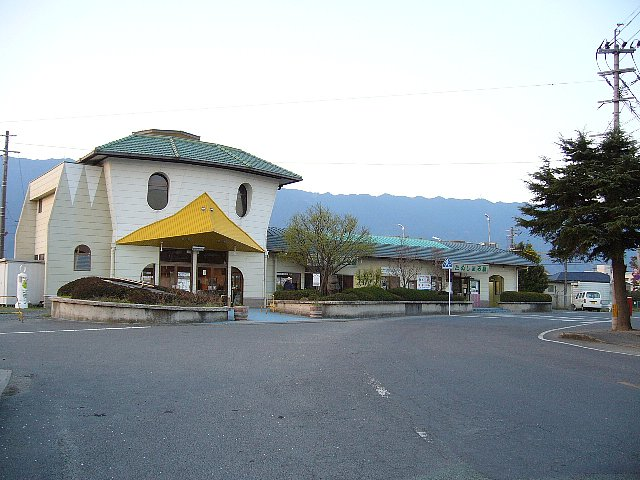
A view of the station facade. The part with the yellow beak is the tourism information centre. The station building is the single storey structure to the right of it.

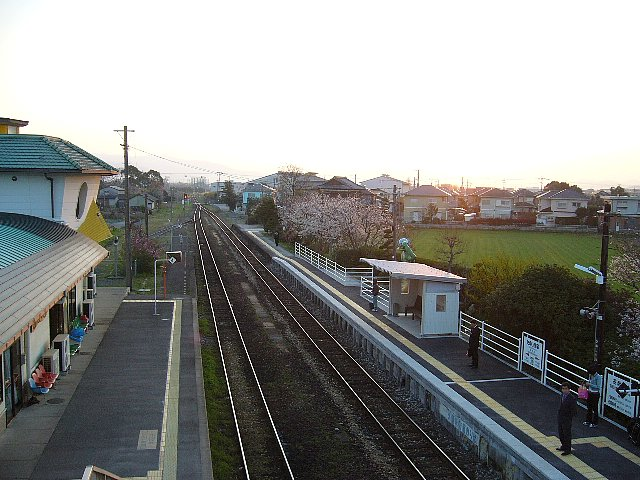
A view of the station platforms and tracks. The siding can be seen in the distance to the left.

== History ==
Japanese Government Railways (JGR) opened a track from Kurume to Chikugo-Yoshii on 24 December 1928 during the first phase of the construction of the Kyudai Main Line. Tanushimaru was opened on the same day as one of several intermediate stations on the track. With the privatization of Japanese National Railways (JNR), the successor of JGR, on 1 April 1987, JR Kyushu took over control of the station.

== Passenger statistics ==
In fiscal 2020, the station was used by an average of 473 passengers daily (boarding passengers only), and it ranked 222nd among the busiest stations of JR Kyushu.

== Surrounding area ==
- Kurume City Hall Tanushimaru General Branch
- Fukuoka Prefectural Ukiha Technical High School

== See also ==
- List of railway stations in Japan
