= Chikugo-Ōishi Station =

Railway station in Ukiha, Fukuoka Prefecture, Japan

Chikugo-Ōishi Station 筑後大石駅
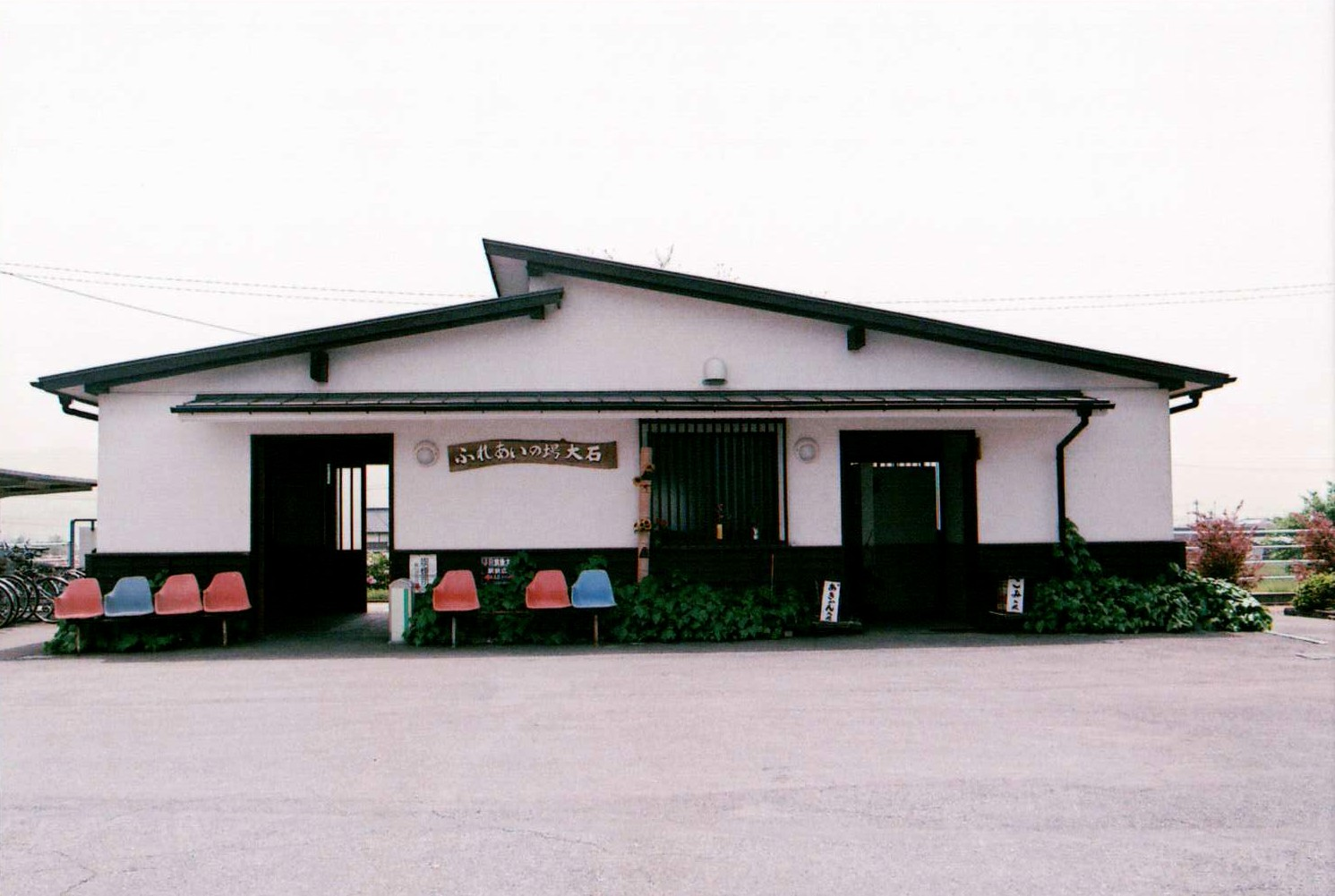
- The waiting room of Chikugo-Ōishi Station in 2011

General information
- Location: Ukihamachi Takami, Ukiha-shi, Fukuoka-ken 839-1407; Japan
- Coordinates: 33°20′51″N 130°48′57″E
- Operator: JR Kyushu
- Line: ■ Kyūdai Main Line
- Distance: 33.0 km from Kurume
- Platforms: 1 side platform
- Tracks: 1 + 1 siding

Construction
- Structure type: At grade
- Cycle facilities: Bike shed

Other information
- Status: Unstaffed
- Website: Official website

History
- Opened: 11 July 1931

Passengers
- FY2009: 320 daily (boarding and disembarking)

Services
Preceding station	JR Kyushu	Following station
Ukiha towards Kurume	Kyūdai Main Line	Yoake towards Ōita
Location
- Location within Fukuoka Prefecture Location within Japan

Chikugo-Ōishi Station (筑後大石駅, Chikugo-Ōishi-eki) is a passenger railway station located in the city of Ukiha, Fukuoka Prefecture, Japan. It is operated by JR Kyushu.

== Lines ==
The station is served by the Kyūdai Main Line and is located 33.0 km from the starting point of the line at Kurume. Only local trains on the line stop at the station.

== Layout ==
The station consists of a side platform serving a single track at grade with a siding. A wooden building has been set up by the local municipal authorities as a waiting room and a bike shed is provided outside. The station is unstaffed but some types of tickets are available from a kan'i itaku agent from a shop near the station.

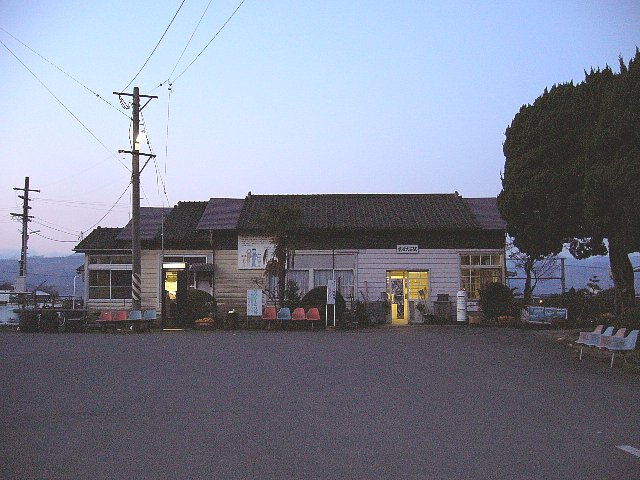
The old station building. This picture was taken in 2006.

== History ==
Japanese Government Railways (JGR) had the Kyūdai Main Line on 24 December 1928 with a track between Kurume and Chikugo-Yoshii. In the second phase of expansion, the track was extended east, with Chikugo-Ōishi opening as the new eastern terminus on 11 July 1931. It became a through-station on 12 March 1932 when the track was extended to Yoake. With the privatization of Japanese National Railways (JNR), the successor of JGR, on 1 April 1987, JR Kyushu took over control of the station.

== Passenger statistics ==
In fiscal 2009, the station was used by a daily average of 320 passengers (boarding and disembarking).

In fiscal 2016, the number of passengers (boarding only) using the station was between 100 and 322. The station did not rank among the top 300 busiest stations of JR Kyushu.

== Surrounding area ==
- Chikugogawa Onsen
- Fukuoka Prefectural Route 732 Chikugo Oishi Stop Line

== See also ==
- List of railway stations in Japan
