= Shinichi Ikejiri =

- Born: 1908; Ukiha, Fukuoka, Japan
- Died: 1945 (aged 36–37); Indonesia
- Occupations: Writer and physician
- Writing career
- Genre: Essays
- Notable works: Itameru Ashi, Gun-i Tensen Oboegaki

Shinichi Ikejiri (池尻 愼一, Ikejiri Shin'ichi; 1908–1945), pen name Shinichi Ōra (邑楽 慎一, Ōra Shin'ichi), was a physician for Hansen's disease patients at Kaishun Hospital of Hannah Riddell and Tama Zenshoen Sanatorium and a writer. His book Itameru Ashi (Diseased Reeds) sold well. He was drafted into the Imperial Japanese Army in 1937 and again in 1941, and shot dead in Indonesia in 1945.

== Life ==
Ikejiri was born in 1908 in Ukiha, Fukuoka Prefecture. He graduated from Private Kyushu Medical School (Kurume University), where he studied physiology. He was a convert to Lutheran Christianity. Unable to find a post in the Nagashima Aiseien Sanatorium, he became a physician at the Kaishun Hospital of Hannah Riddell at Kumamoto in April 1934. He gave his blood to a critically ill patient with leprosy through blood transfusion, an event which was written about in newspapers at the time. In August 1936, he was transferred to the Tama Zenshoen Sanatorium. In August 1937 he was drafted and sent to China.

In 1940, he published his book Itameru Ashi, which sold well; more than 30 printings were done within the year. Later that same year, he published Gun-i Tensen Monogatari (Memos of a Military Doctor in Battle). In 1941, he was again drafted, and went to Burma. In April 1944 he went to Jakarta University, to study leprosy under Professor Kentarō Higuchi. According to Higuchi's account, Ikejiri was shot dead in January 1945 by a third-country national.

== Selected works ==
- Itameru Ashi 傷める葦 [Diseased Reeds], 山雅房 [Sangabō], 1940, JPNO 46044910.
  - It sold well, going through 25 printings by October 1940 and 30 by a month later. It consisted of the following chapters: Memorandoms of a leprosy physician, Runaways, Stories from the hospital wards, Dawn, House of depressed ground, Valley with a rainbow, History of leprosy in Europe, Study of psychology of leprosy patients. Note that the NDL number cited is for the 6th edition.
- Gun-i Tensen Oboegaki 軍医転戦覚書 [Memos of a Military Doctor in Battle], 中央公論社 [Chūō Kōronsha], 1940, JPNO 46050811
- Shi-fu-go: Kindai Shina Densetsushū 子不語：近代支那伝説集 [Of What Confucius Did Not Speak: A Collection of Tales from Modern China], 長崎書店 [Nagasaki Shoten], 1941, JPNO 46014007.
  - The title refers to Yuan Mei's Zi Bu Yu. Distributed with the money earned by Itameru Ashi.
- Gun-i Tensen Oboegaki, Zoku 軍医転戦覚書・続 [Memos of a Military Doctor in Battle, Continued], 長崎書店 [Nagasaki Shoten], 1944, JPNO 46036690.
  - During a short stay, Ikejiri visited a Rangoon (Yangon) leprosarium which held roughly 420 patients. There, he found the signature of Fumio Hayashi, who visited it around 1933. He also met a French missionary; the missionary's knowledge of commentator Tōta Ishimaru impressed Ikejiri.
