= Ukiha =

Ukiha うきは市
- City
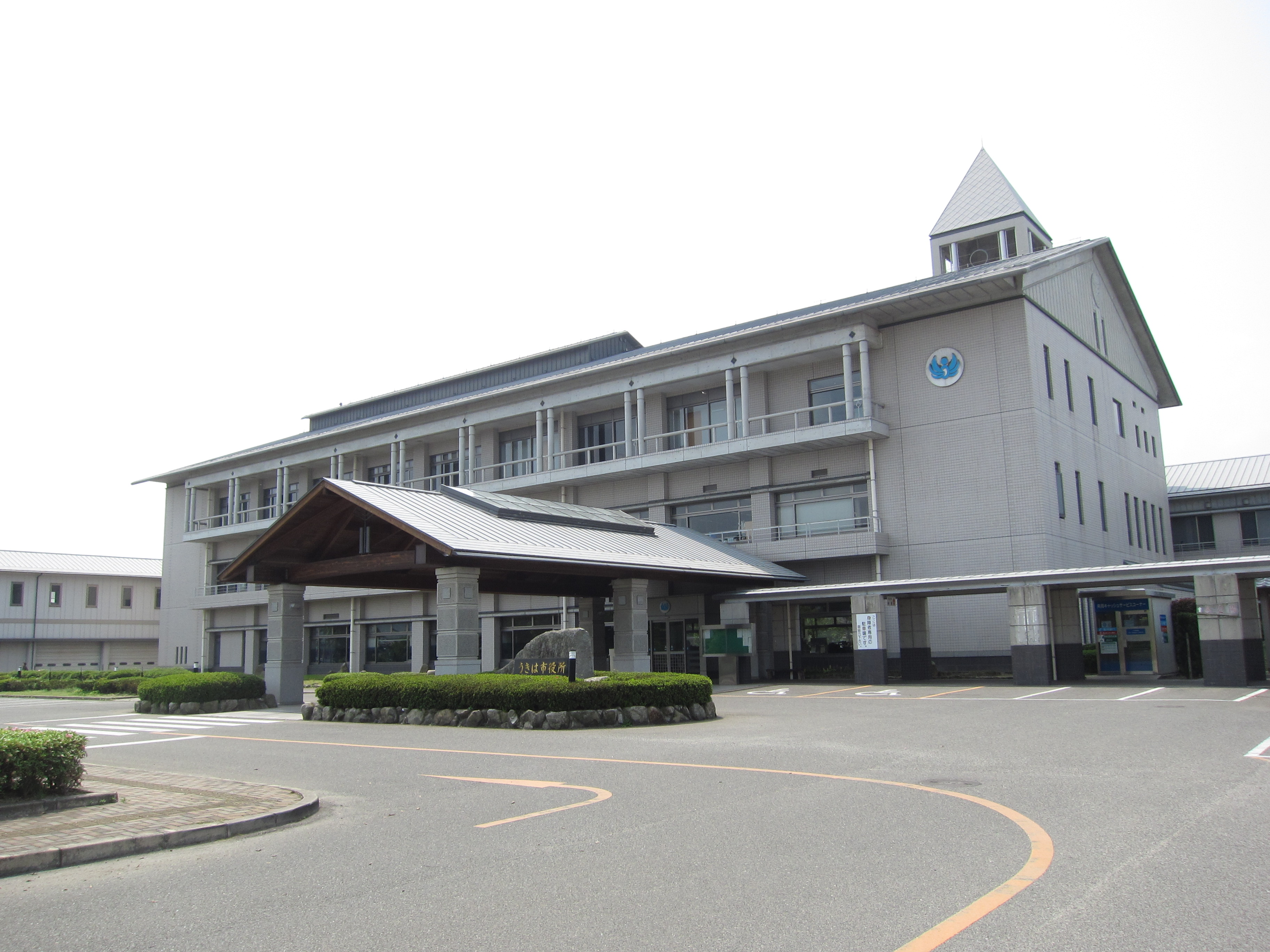
- Ukiha city hall

- Flag Seal
- Location of Ukiha in Fukuoka Prefecture

- Location in Japan
- Coordinates: 33°21′N 130°45′E
- Country: Japan
- Region: Kyushu
- Prefecture: Fukuoka

Government
  - Mayor: Hideki Gondo

Area
  - Total: 117.46 km^{2} (45.35 sq mi)

Population (January 31, 2024)
  - Total: 27,723
  - Density: 236.02/km^{2} (611.29/sq mi)
- Time zone: UTC+09:00 (JST)
- City hall address: 316 Niiharu, Yoshii-cho, Ukiha-shi, Fukuoka-ken 839-1393
- Website: Official website
- Symbols
- Bird: Common kingfisher
- Flower: Lycoris radiata
- Tree: Diospyros kaki

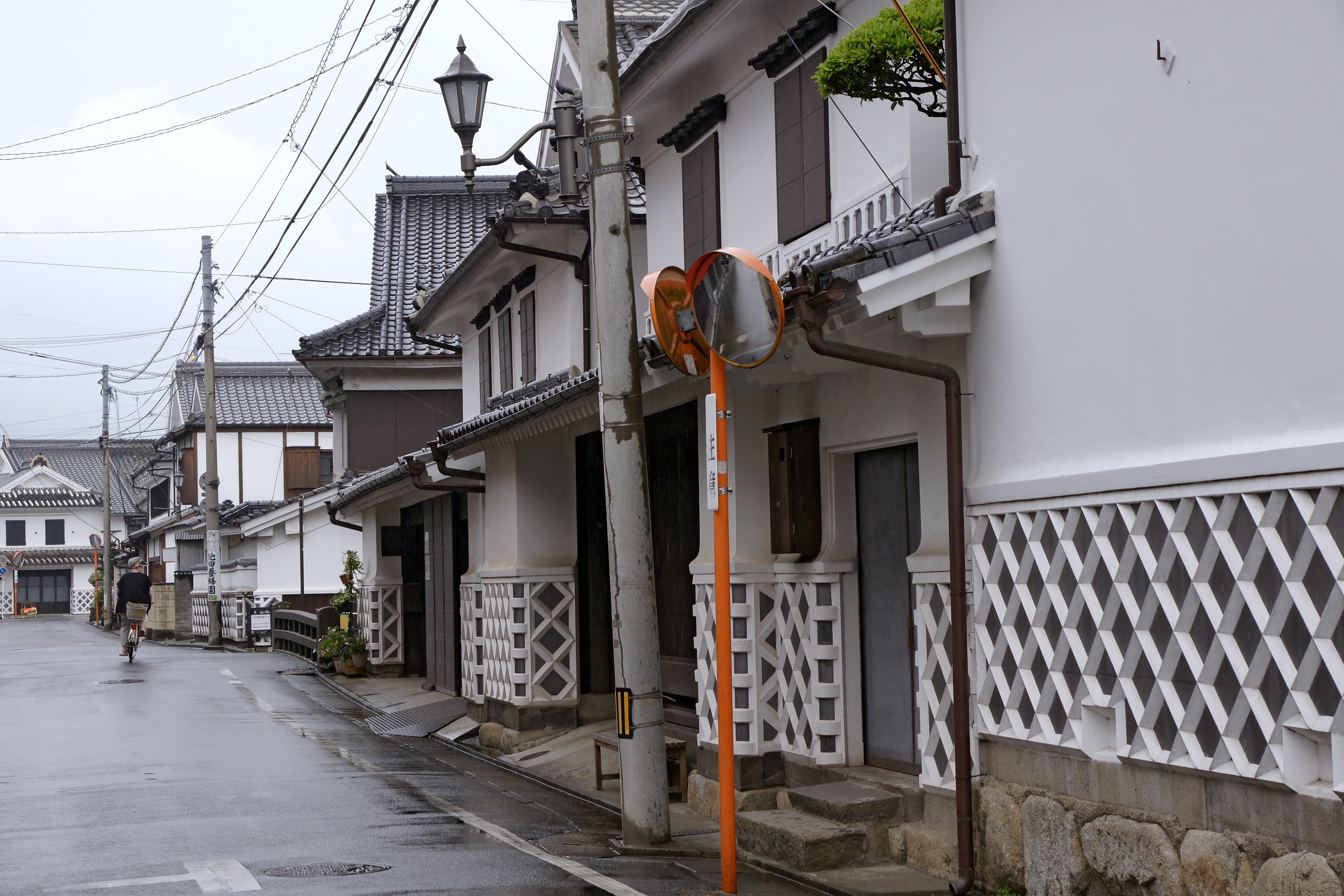
Shirokabe street in the historic Chikugo Yoshii district

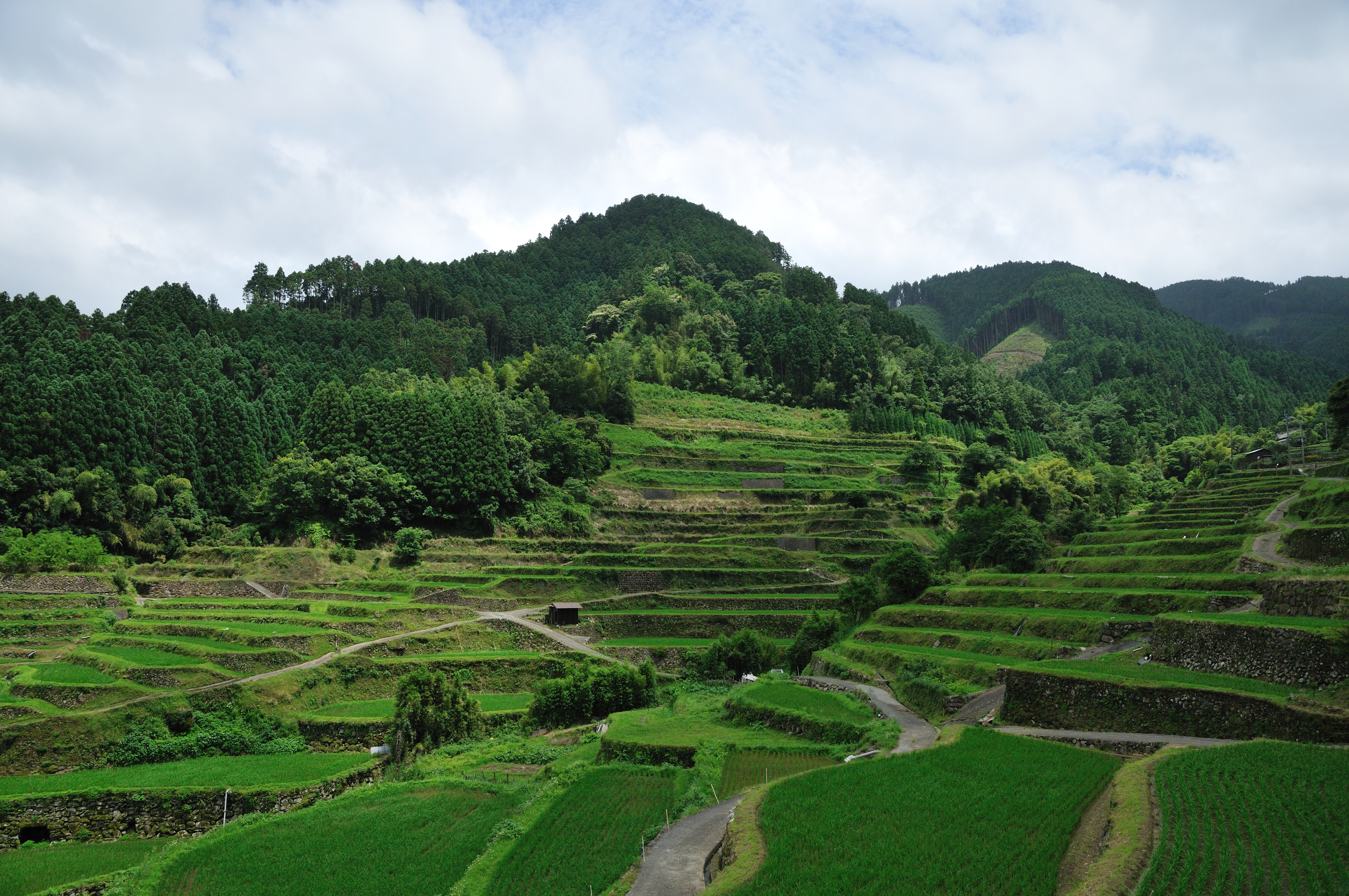
Tsuzura rice terraces

Ukiha (うきは市, Ukiha-shi; Japanese pronunciation: [ɯ̈́.k̟ʲi̥.hä̀, ɯ̈̀.k̟ʲi̥.hä́(.ɕì)]) is a city located in Fukuoka Prefecture, Japan. As of 31 January 2024, the city had an estimated population of 27,723 in 11449 households, and a population density of 240 persons per km^{2}. The total area of the city is 117.46 km^{2} (45.35 sq mi).

== Geography ==
Ukiha is located in southern Fukuoka Prefecture, adjacent to Hita City in Oita Prefecture. It borders Asakura City across the Chikugo River, Tanushimaru-cho, Kurume City to the west, and Hoshino-mura, Yame City to the south.

=== Neighboring municipalities ===
Fukuoka Prefecture

- Asakura
- Kurume
- Yame

Ōita Prefecture

- Hita

=== Climate ===
Ukiha has a humid subtropical climate (Köppen Cfa) characterized by warm summers and cool winters with light to no snowfall. The average annual temperature in Ukiha is 13.9 °C. The average annual rainfall is 1875 mm with September as the wettest month. The temperatures are highest on average in August, at around 25.0 °C, and lowest in January, at around 2.7 °C.

=== Demographics ===
Per Japanese census data, the population of Ikiha is as shown below

Historical population
| Year | Pop. | ±% |
|---|---|---|
| 1950 | 43,085 | — |
| 1960 | 40,428 | −6.2% |
| 1970 | 37,301 | −7.7% |
| 1980 | 36,762 | −1.4% |
| 1990 | 35,910 | −2.3% |
| 2000 | 34,045 | −5.2% |
| 2010 | 31,653 | −7.0% |
| 2020 | 27,981 | −11.6% |

== History ==
The area of Ukiha was part of ancient Chikugo Province. During the Edo Period the area was under the control of Kurume Domain. After the Meiji restoration, the village of Ukiha was established on May 1, 1889 with the creation of the modern municipalities system. Ukima merged with the village of Tsubago on April 1, 1929 to form the village of Miyuki, which was raised to town status on January 1, 1951. Three months later, Miyuki merged with the villages of Oishi, Himeji and Yamaharu to form the town of Ukiha. Ukiha absorbed the town of Yoshii and was raised to city status on March 20, 2005.

== Government ==
Ukiha has a mayor-council form of government with a directly elected mayor and a unicameral city council of 14 members. Ukiha, collectively with the city of Kurume, contributes five members to the Fukuoka Prefectural Assembly. In terms of national politics, the city is part of the Fukuoka 6th district of the lower house of the Diet of Japan.

== Transportation ==
=== Railways ===
JR Kyushu - Kyūdai Main Line

■ Chikugo-Yoshii - Ukiha - Chikugo-Ōishi

=== Highways ===
- National Route 210

== Sister cities ==
- (Japan) Esashi, Hokkaido, since 31 October 2009, due to its association with The Crab and the Monkey folktale

== Notable sites ==
- Chikugo-Yoshii, designated under the Groups of Traditional Buildings

=== National Historic Sites ===
- Hinooka Kofun
- Kusumyō-Shigesada Kofun
- Tsukahanazuka Kofun
- Yakata Kofun Cluster

== Notable people from Ukiha ==
- Kenji Darvish - drummer of Golden Bomber, Japanese rock band.
- Hideo Murata - rōkyoku and enka singer
- Shinichi Ikejiri - writer and physician
- Shinya Izumi - politician
- Yasunoshin Shinohara - inspector general and jujutsu master of Shinsengumi
- Shuntaro Torigoe - journalist
- Shunsuke Imamura - Olympic track cyclist and professional road cyclist

=== Related people ===
- Ellison Onizuka - His grandfather and mother were born in this city, and he visited there in 1983. There is "Ellison Onizuka Bridge" commemorate him.
