= Kurume-Daigakumae Station =

Railway station in Kurume, Fukuoka Prefecture, Japan

Kurume-Daigakumae Station 久留米大学前駅
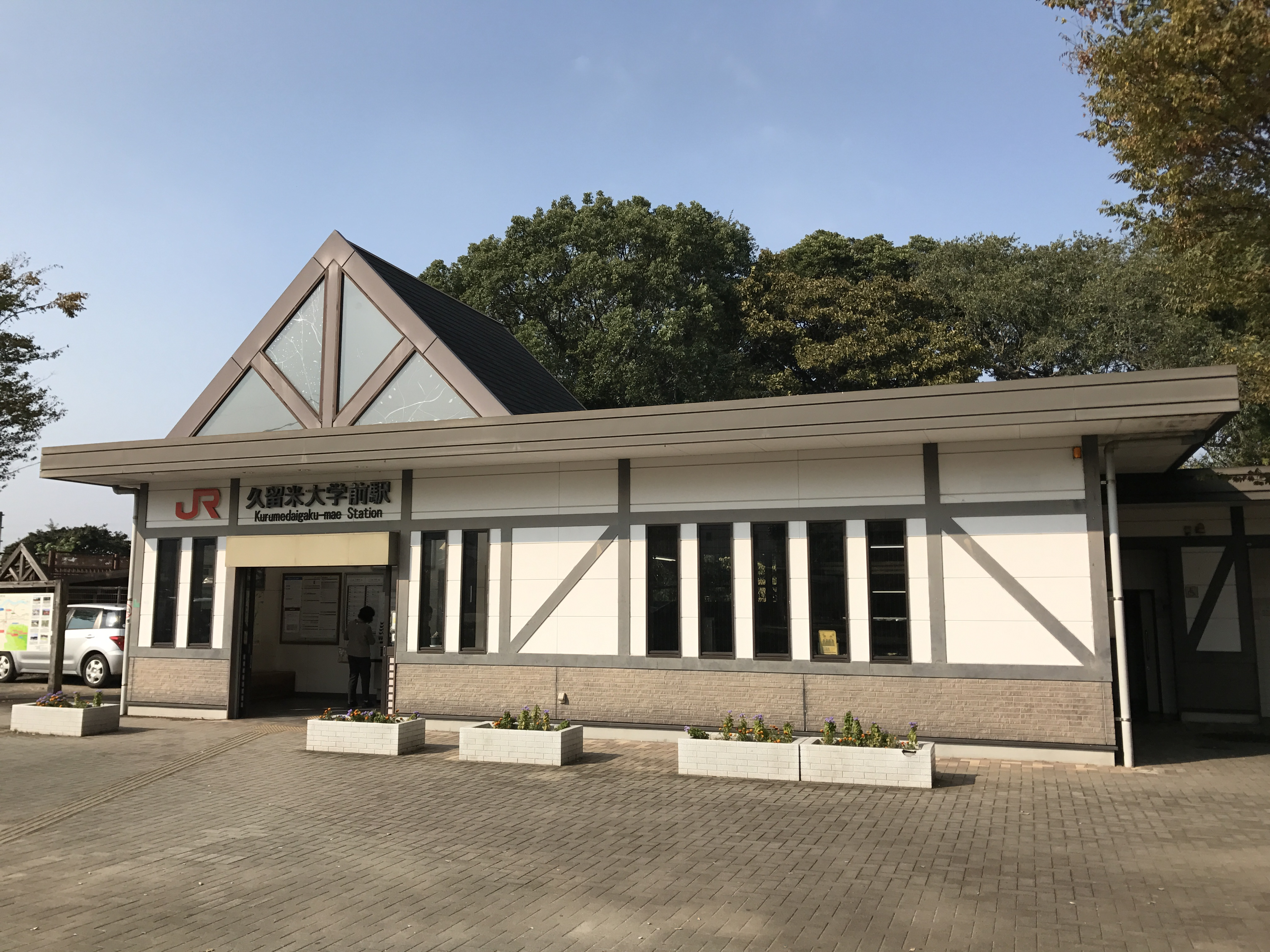
- Kurume-Daigakumae Station in 2016

General information
- Location: 1-chōme-8 Miiasazuma, Kurume-shi, Fukuoka-ken 839-084; Japan
- Coordinates: 33°18′39″N 130°32′55″E
- Operator: JR Kyushu
- Line: Kyūdai Main Line
- Distance: 6.8 km (4.2 mi) from Kurume
- Platforms: 1 side platform
- Tracks: 1

Construction
- Structure type: At grade
- Cycle facilities: Designated parking area for bikes

Other information
- Status: Staffed ticket window (outsourced)
- Website: Official website

History
- Opened: 11 March 2000

Passengers
- FY2020: 797 daily
- Rank: 165th (among JR Kyushu stations)

Services
Preceding station	JR Kyushu	Following station
Minami-Kurume towards Kurume	Kyūdai Main Line	Mii towards Ōita
Location
- Location within Fukuoka Prefecture Location within Japan

Kurume-Daigakumae Station (久留米大学前駅, Kurume-Daigakumae-eki) is a passenger railway station located in the city of Kurume, Fukuoka Prefecture, Japan. It is operated by JR Kyushu. The name means, literally, "in front of Kurume University".

== Lines ==
The station is served by the Kyudai Main Line and is located 6.8 km from the starting point of the line at Kurume. Only local trains on the line stop at the station.

== Layout ==
The station consists of a side platform serving a single track. The station building is a modern wooden structure with a triangular roof skylight. It houses a waiting area, automatic ticket vending machine and a staffed ticket window.

Management of the station has been outsourced to the JR Kyushu Tetsudou Eigyou Co., a wholly owned subsidiary of JR Kyushu specialising in station services. It staffs the ticket counter which is equipped with a POS machine but does not have a Midori no Madoguchi facility.

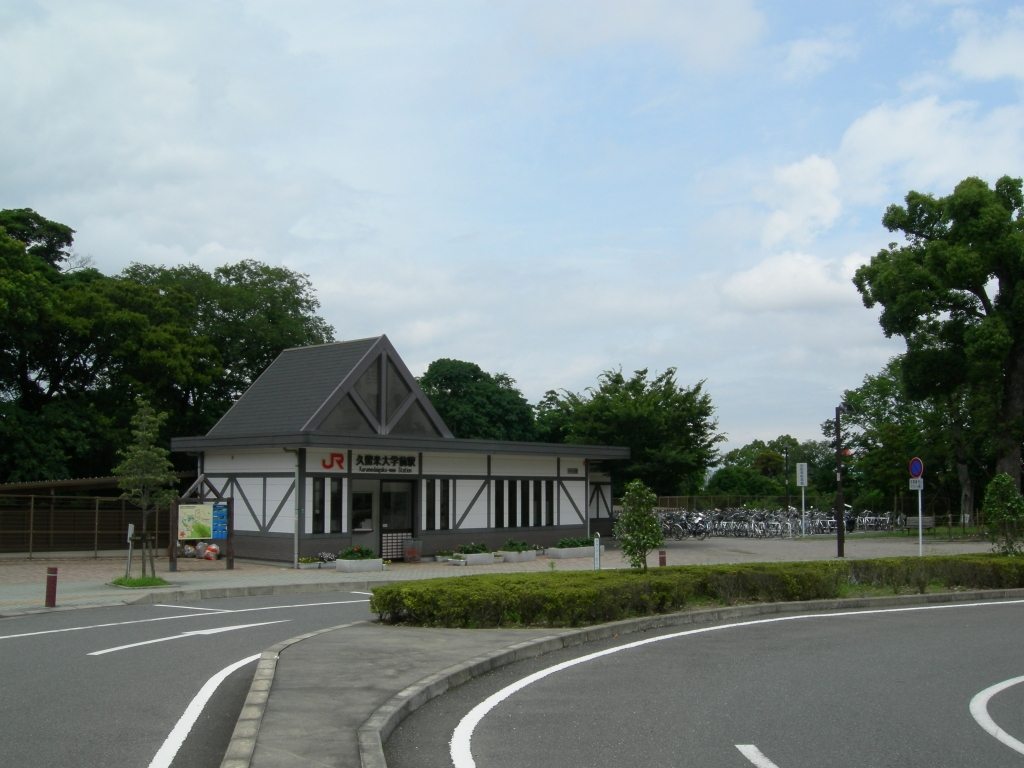
A distant view of the station. There is parking for bikes but no lots for cars at the forecourt.

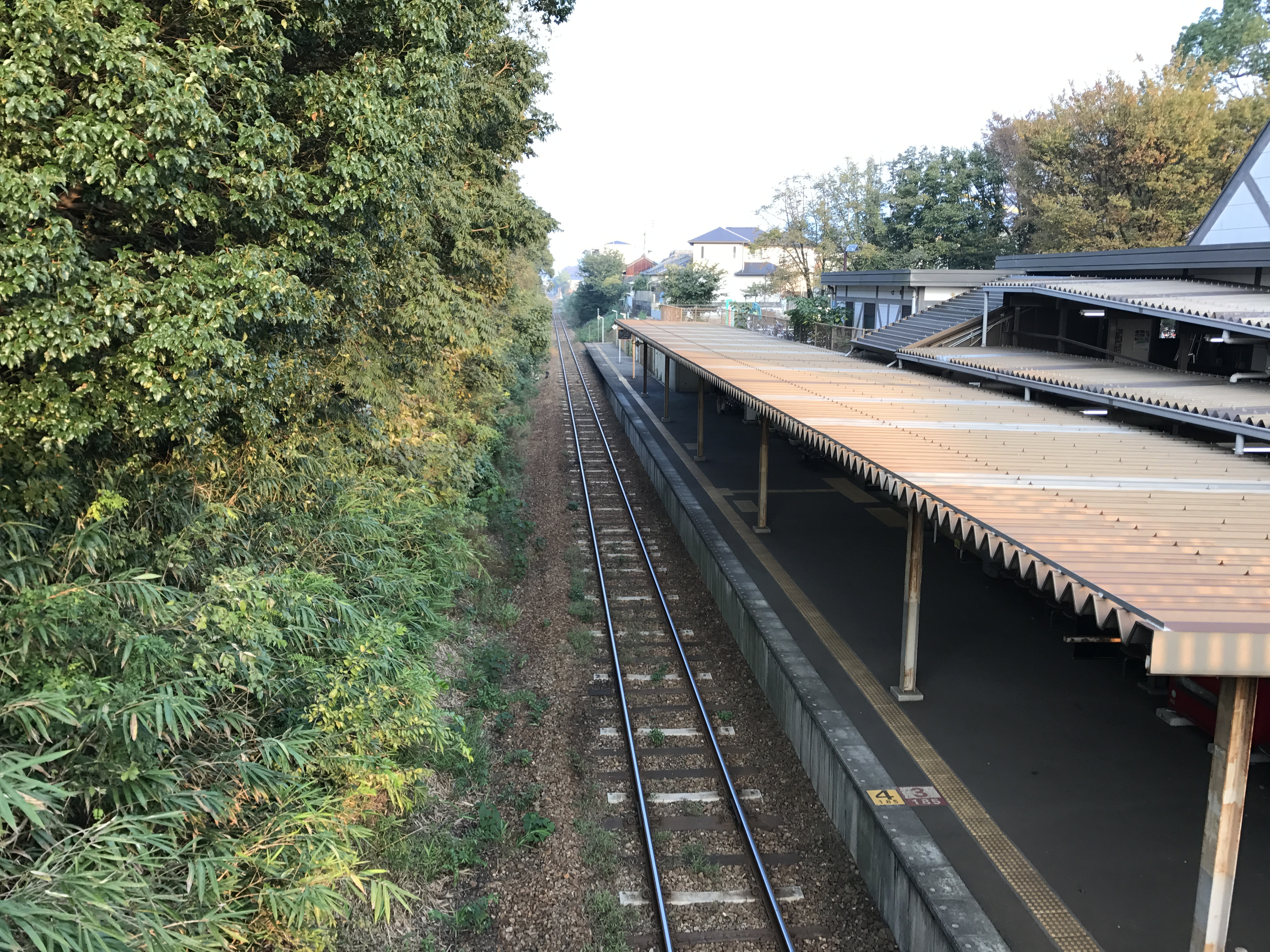
A view of the platform and track

== History ==
JR Kyushu opened the station on 11 March 2000 as an additional station on the existing track of the Kyudai Main Line.

== Passenger statistics ==
In fiscal 2020, the station was used by an average of 797 passengers daily (boarding passengers only), and it ranked 165th among the busiest stations of JR Kyushu.

== Surrounding area ==
- Kurume University
- Kurume University Medical Center
- Kurume City Nanchiku High School
- Kurume Shinai Junior High School / High School

== See also ==
- List of railway stations in Japan
