= Tsukahanazuka Kofun =

- 塚花塚古墳 (Japanese)
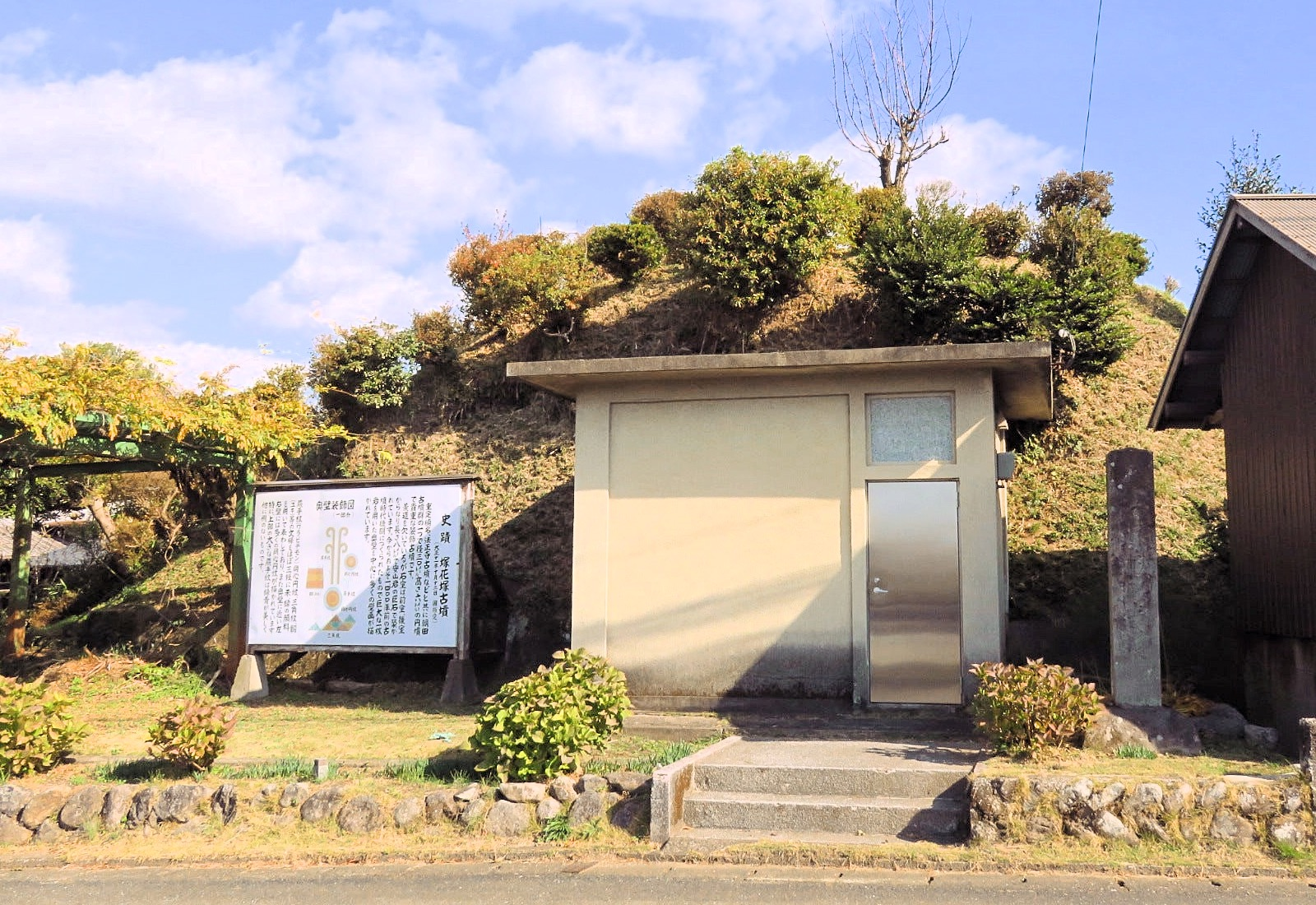
- Tsukahanazuka Kofun

- Tsukahanazuka Kofun Tsukahanazuka Kofun (Japan)
- Interactive map of Tsukahanazuka Kofun
- 33°19′44″N 130°47′55″E
- Type: Kofun
- Periods: Kofun period
- Location: Ukiha, Fukuoka, Japan
- Region: Kyushu

History
- Built: c.6th century

Site notes
- Public access: Yes (no facilities)

The Tsukahanazuka Kofun (塚花塚古墳) is a burial mound from the Kofun period, located in the Asada neighborhood of Ukiha, Fukuoka Prefecture, Japan. The tumulus was designated a National Historic Site of Japan in 1922.

== Overview ==
The Tsukahanazuka Kofun is an enpun (円墳) circular tumulus, with a diameter of approximately 30 meters and a height of about six meters. Situated on the left bank of the Chikugo River at the edge of an alluvial fan that originates from the foot of Mount Minou. Tsukahanazuka Kofun is notable for its decorated kofun and unique burial structure. It contains a multi-room horizontal stone burial chamber, although part of the corridor leading to the burial chamber has been lost. The remaining structure has a total length of eight meters, with the anterior chamber measuring two meters in length and 2.5 meters in width at its widest point, while the posterior chamber is 3.4 meters long and 2.5 meters at its maximum width.

The decorative elements of the kofun are centered on the back wall of the posterior chamber, extending to both adjacent walls. The designs include a red double concentric circle on the left wall, and both double and triple concentric circles in red and green on the right wall. The mural on the back wall is divided into three sections: the upper row features a long warabi fern pattern with an unusual shape, the middle row contains two tiers of concentric circles, and additional warabi fern patterns adorn the surrounding walls. A small shield-shaped trapezoidal design and a series of triangular patterns appear at the bottom.

Grave goods recovered from this tumulus include Sue ware pottery, copper saddle fittings, a large sword, and approximately 400 small red beads. These items are on display at the Ukiha City History and Folklore Museum. The tumulus is accessible by a 15-minute walk from Ukiha Station on the JR Kyushu Kyūdai Main Line.

== See also ==
- List of Historic Sites of Japan (Fukuoka)
- Decorated kofun
