= Ukiha Station =

Railway station in Ukiha, Fukuoka Prefecture, Japan

Ukiha Station うきは駅
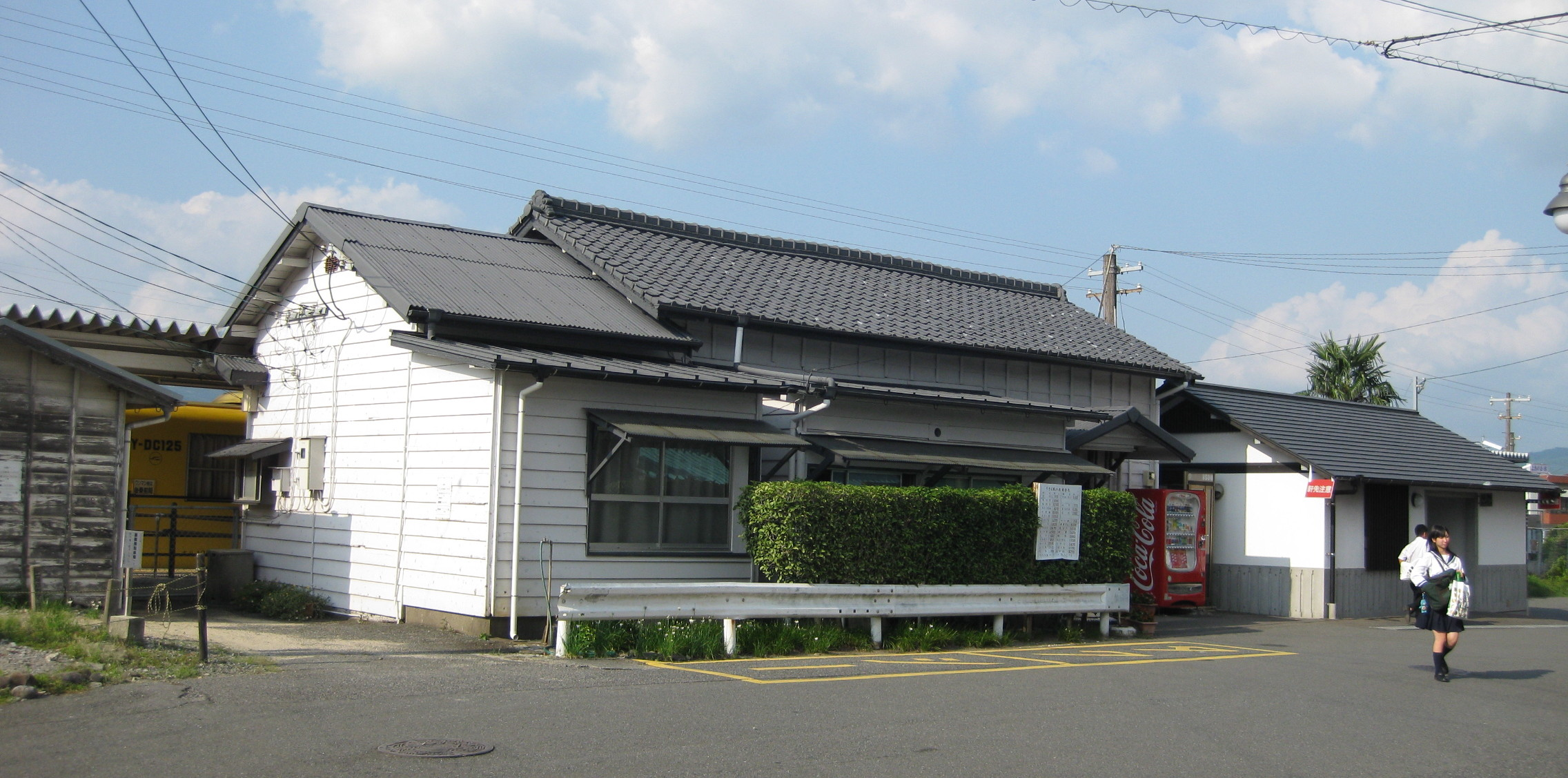
- Ukiha Station in 2008

General information
- Location: Ukihamachi Asada, Ukiha-shi, Fukuoka-ken 839-1401; Japan
- Coordinates: 33°20′06″N 130°47′20″E
- Operator: JR Kyushu
- Line: ■ Kyūdai Main Line
- Distance: 30.0 km from Kurume
- Platforms: 2 side platforms
- Tracks: 2 + 2 sidings

Construction
- Structure type: At grade
- Accessible: No - platforms linked by footbridge

Other information
- Status: Kan'i itaku station
- Website: Official website

History
- Opened: 11 July 1931
- Former names: Chikugo-Senzoku (until 1 May 1990)

Services
Preceding station	JR Kyushu	Following station
Chikugo-Yoshii towards Kurume	Kyūdai Main Line	Chikugo-Ōishi towards Ōita
Location
- Location within Fukuoka Prefecture Location within Japan

Ukiha Station (うきは駅, Ukiha-eki) is a passenger railway station located in the city of Ukiha, Fukuoka Prefecture, Japan. It is operated by JR Kyushu.

== Lines ==
The station is served by the Kyūdai Main Line and is located 30.0 km from the starting point of the line at Kurume. Only local trains on the line stop at the station.

== Layout ==
The station consists of two side platforms serving two tracks at grade. Two sidings branch off track 2. The station building is a wooden structure in Japanese style. The ticket window is managed by a Kan'i itaku agent and is equipped with a POS machine but does not have a Midori no Madoguchi facility. Access to the opposite side platform is by means of a footbridge.

=== Platforms ===
1	■ ■Kyūdai Main Line	for Kurume
2	■ ■ Kyūdai Main Line	for Hita

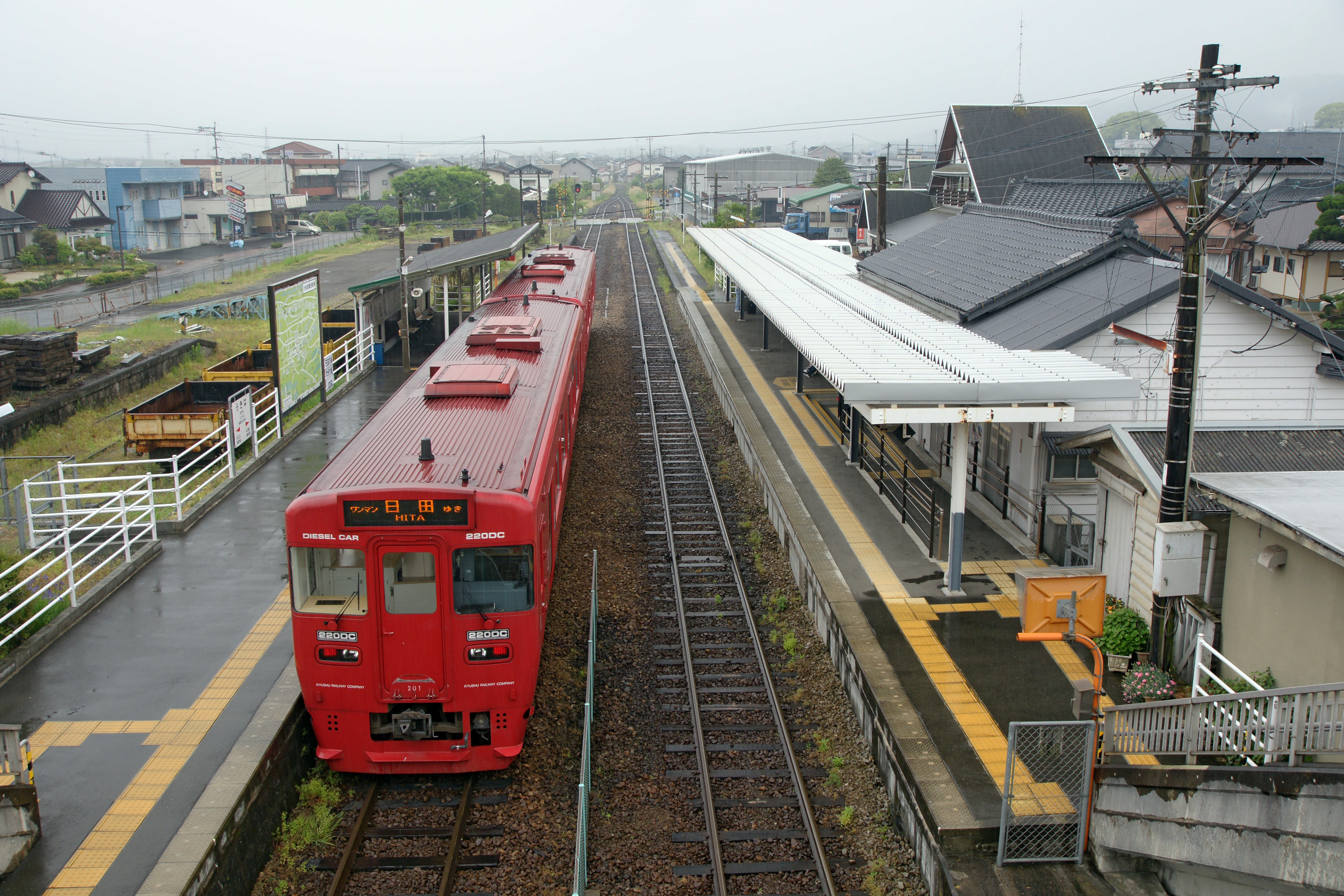
A view of the station platforms and tracks. Sidings branching off track 2 can be seen to the left.

== History ==
Japanese Government Railways (JGR) had the Kyūdai Main Line on 24 December 1928 with a track between Kurume and Chikugo-Yoshii. In the second phase of expansion, the track was extended east, with Chikugo-Ōishi opening as the new eastern terminus on 11 July 1931. On the same day, this station was opened as an intermediate station along the new track under the name Chikugo-Senzoku (筑後千足). With the privatization of Japanese National Railways (JNR), the successor of JGR, on 1 April 1987, JR Kyushu took over control of the station. On 1 May 1990, the station name was changed to Ukiha.

== Passenger statistics ==
In fiscal 2016, the number of passengers (boarding only) using the station was between 100 and 322. The station did not rank among the top 300 busiest stations of JR Kyushu.

== Surrounding area ==
- Ukiha City Hall Ukiha Building (formerly Ukiha Town Hall)
- Japan National Route 210

== See also ==
- List of railway stations in Japan
