= Chikugo-Yoshii Station =

Railway station in Ukiha, Fukuoka Prefecture, Japan

Chikugo-Yoshii Station 筑後吉井駅
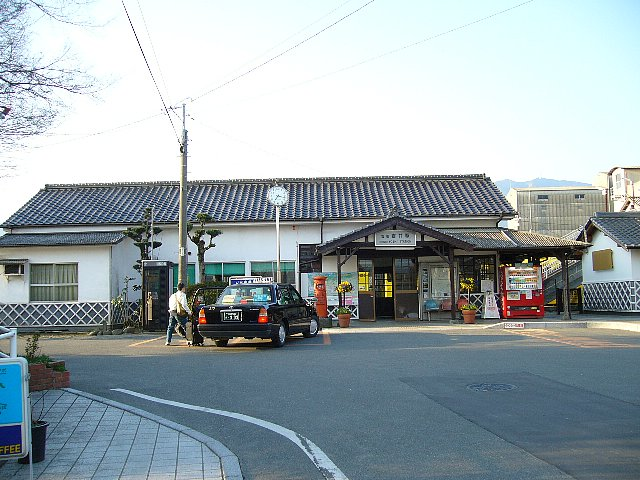
- Chikugo-Yoshii Station in 2006

General information
- Location: 199 Yoshiimachi, Ukiha-shi, Fukuoka-ken 839-1321; Japan
- Coordinates: 33°20′28″N 130°45′08″E
- Operator: JR Kyushu
- Line: Kyūdai Main Line
- Distance: 26.4 km (16.4 mi) from Kurume
- Platforms: 2 side platforms
- Tracks: 2 + 2 sidings

Construction
- Structure type: At grade
- Accessible: No - platforms linked by footbridge

Other information
- Status: Staffed ticket window (outsourced)
- Website: Official website

History
- Opened: 24 December 1928; 97 years ago

Passengers
- FY2021: 398 daily
- Rank: 233rd (among JR Kyushu stations)

Services
Preceding station	JR Kyushu	Following station
Tanushimaru towards Kurume	Kyūdai Main Line	Ukiha towards Ōita
Location
- Location within Fukuoka Prefecture Location within Kyushu Location within Japan

Chikugo-Yoshii Station (筑後吉井駅, Chikugo-Yoshii-eki) is a passenger railway station located in the city of Ukiha, Fukuoka Prefecture, Japan. It is operated by JR Kyushu.

== Lines ==
The station is served by the Kyūdai Main Line and is located 26.4 km from the starting point of the line at Kurume. Only local trains on the line stop at the station.

== Layout ==
The station consists of one island platform and side platforms serving three tracks at grade. Two sidings branch off track 1. The station is a modern structure but built in a traditional Japanese style with white plaster namako walls to recall the white plaster traditional houses which are a tourist attraction in former Yoshii town nearby. The station building houses a waiting room and a ticket window. Access to the opposite side platform is by means of a footbridge.

Management of the station has been outsourced to the JR Kyushu Tetsudou Eigyou Co., a wholly owned subsidiary of JR Kyushu specialising in station services. It staffs the ticket counter which is equipped with a POS machine but does not have a Midori no Madoguchi facility.

=== Platforms ===
1, 3	■ ■Kyūdai Main Line	for Hita
2, 3	■ ■ Kyūdai Main Line	for Kurume

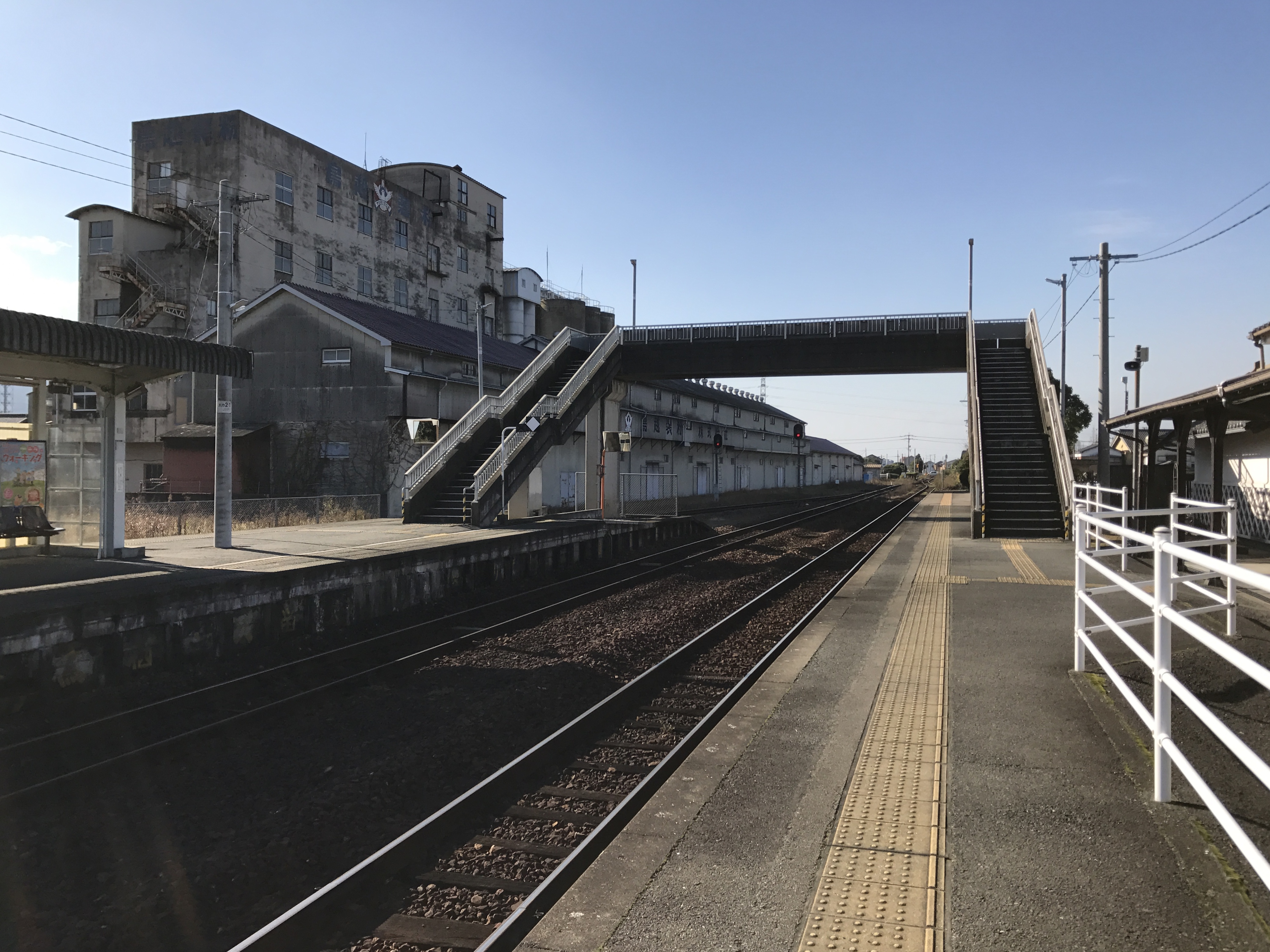
A view of the station platforms and tracks.

== History ==
Japanese Government Railways (JGR) opened Chikugo-Yoshii on 24 December 1928 as the eastern terminus of a track from Kurume during the first phase of the construction of the Kyūdai Main Line. Chikugo-Yoshii became a through-station on 11 July 1931 when the track was extended east to Chikugo-Ōishi. With the privatization of Japanese National Railways (JNR), the successor of JGR, on 1 April 1987, JR Kyushu took over control of the station.

== Passenger statistics ==
In fiscal 2016, the station was used by an average of 549 passengers daily (boarding passengers only), and it ranked 233ed among the busiest stations of JR Kyushu.

== Surrounding area ==
- Yoshii town traditional houses. A group of traditional buildings built with namako white plaster walls for fire-proofing in a style known as dozo dzukuri. The district is located near the station and has been officially classified as an Important Preservation District for Groups of Traditional Buildings.
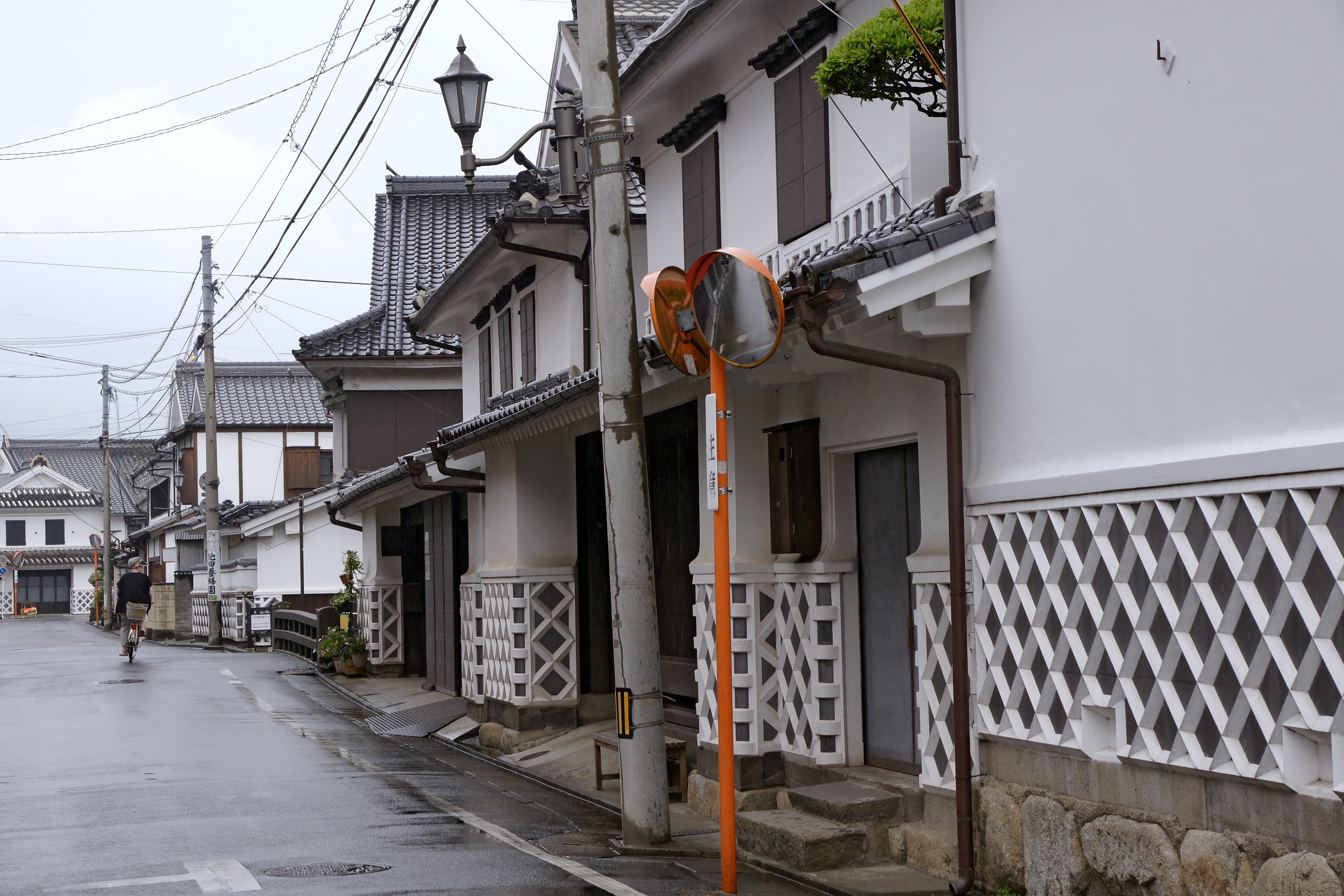
Traditional houses in Yoshii town. The station building is built to resemble them.

== See also ==
- List of railway stations in Japan
