= TORO-Q =

Japanese sightseeing train service (2002–2009)

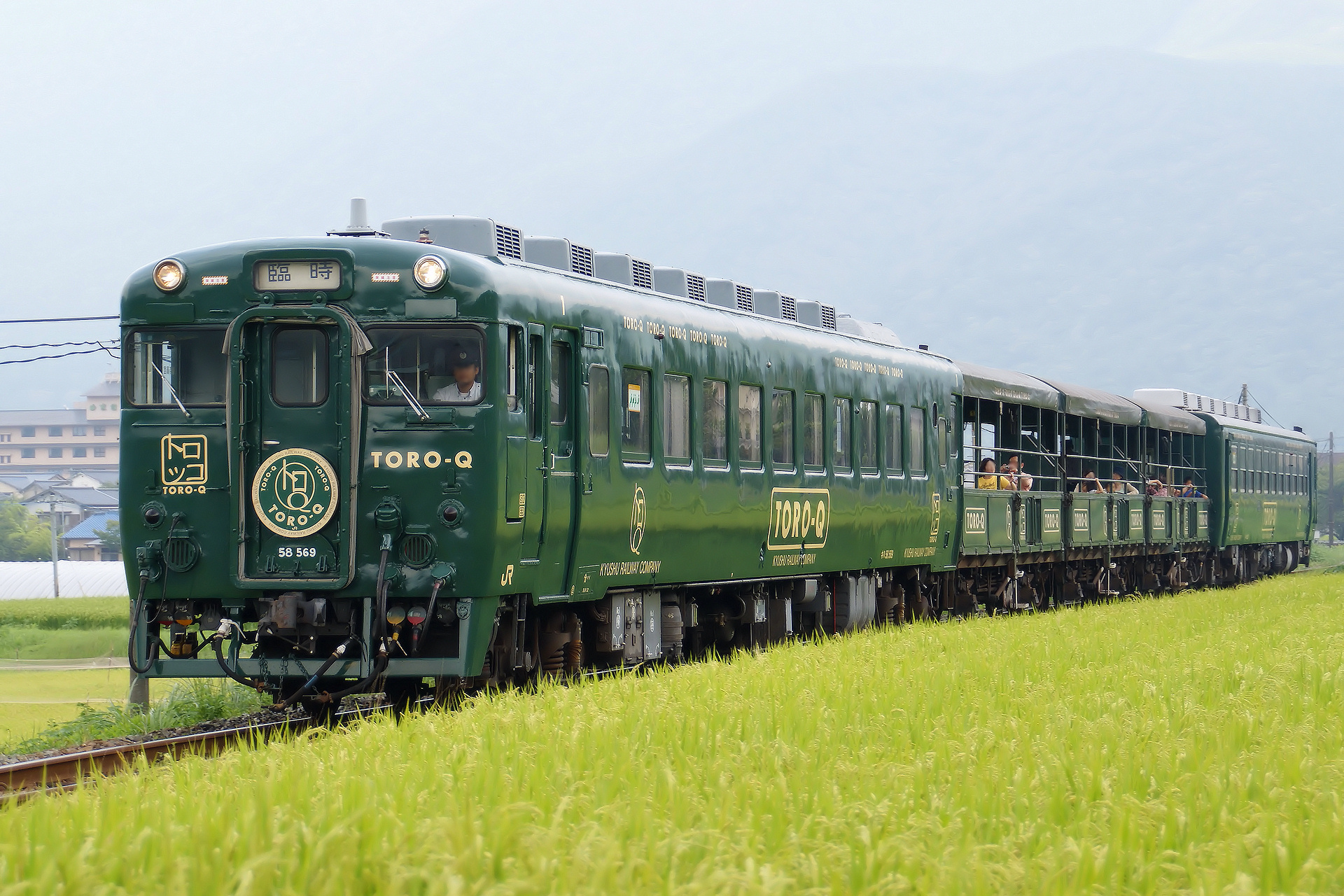
TORO-Q

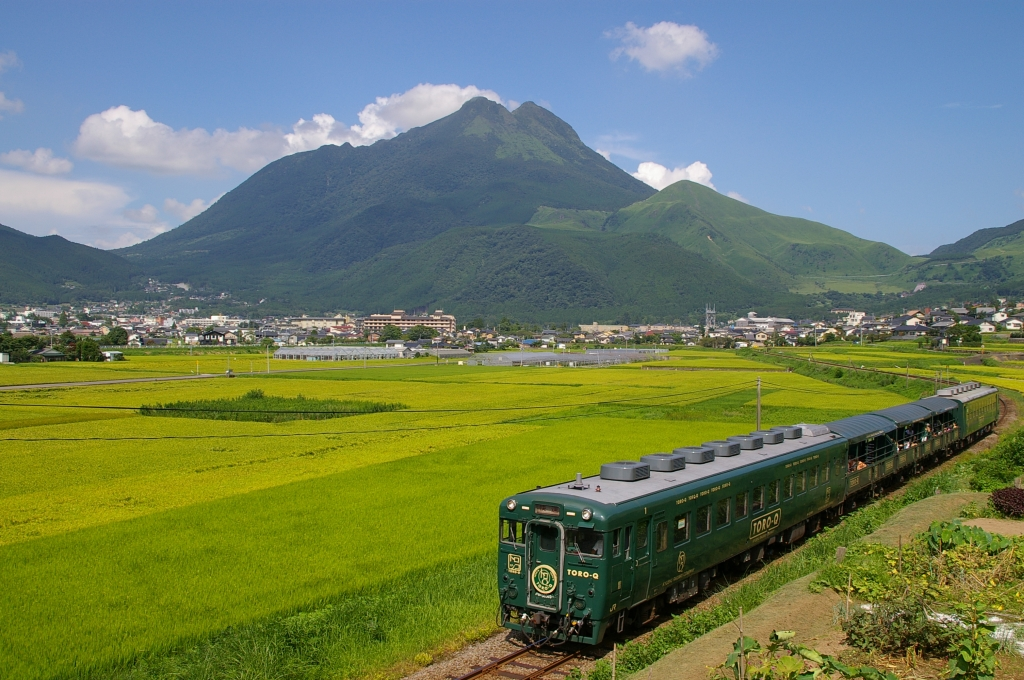
The TORO-Q operating on the Kyūdai Main Line

TORO-Q was a sightseeing open-air train operated by JR Kyushu between Yufuin and Minami-Yufu on the Kyūdai Main Line.

== History ==
The train started operation in October 2002.

Due to the rolling stock's increasing age, the service was suspended on November 29, 2009. Commemorative boarding passes were distributed from November 7.

== Operation ==
In the morning, a single Rapid service (not using the TORO-Q name) between Ōita and Yufuin was operated. The train would then make 5 round trips between Yufuin and Minami-Yufu, and then return to Ōita running as a Rapid service again.

== Rolling stock ==
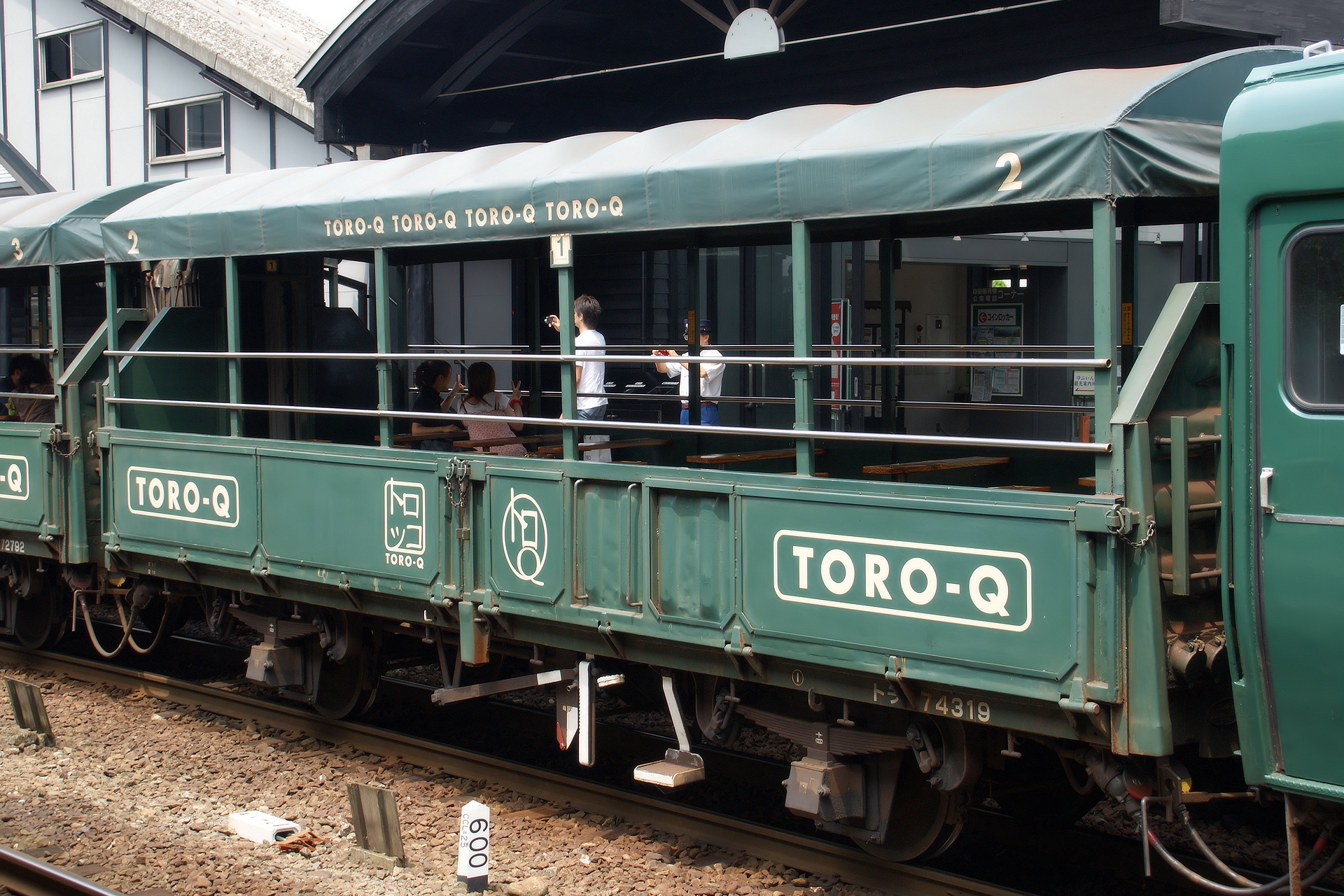
ToRa 74319

The train was formed of five vehicles, with a railcar (KiHa 65 36 and KiHa 58 569) at both ends of the trains, and three open-air cars based on the ToRa 70000 series between.

== After the suspension ==
Both railcars used for the TORO-Q were restored to the JNR express color scheme after the service was suspended, and they were then used in heritage and event trains
