= KiHa 71 series =

Japanese train type

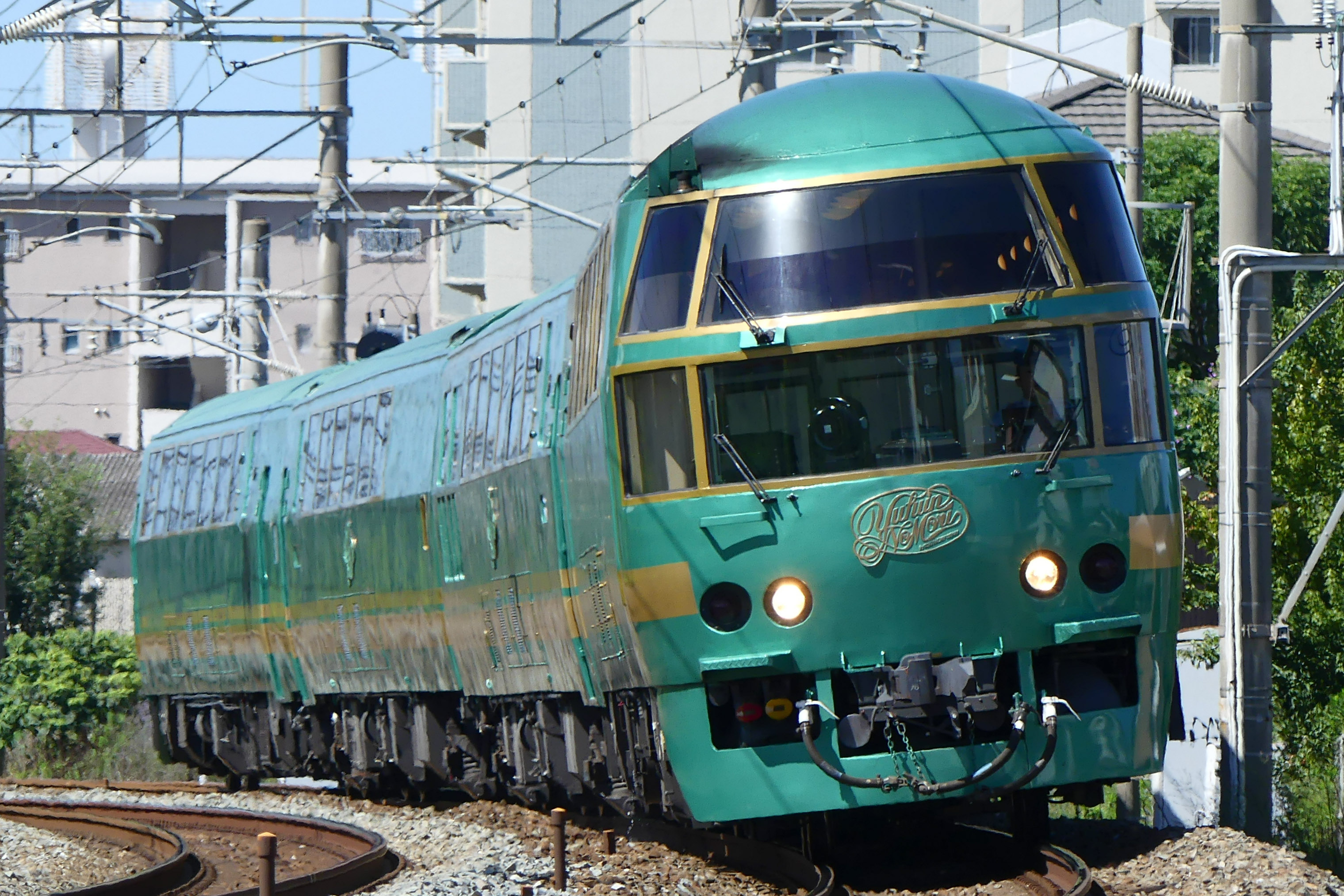
- KiHa 71 series on Yufuin-no-mori service, August 2017
- In service: 1989-present
- Constructed: 1989-1990
- Refurbished: 2003
- Number built: 4 vehicles (1 set)
- Number in service: 4 vehicles (1 set)
- Formation: 4 cars per trainset (originally 3 cars)
- Operator: JR Kyushu

Specifications
- Doors: 1 per side
- Prime movers: SA6D125-HD1 (360 hp) x1 (KiHa 71); SA6D125-HD1A (300 hp) x2 (KiHa 70)
- Track gauge: 1,067 mm

The KiHa 71 series (キハ71系) is a diesel multiple unit (DMU) train type operated by Kyushu Railway Company exclusively on the Yufuin no Mori service in Kyushu, Japan.

The "KiHa" designation derives from the classification system used by JNR. "Ki" indicates a diesel-powered vehicle, while "Ha" indicates an ordinary passenger car, as opposed to a green car.

One 3-car set was introduced on March 11, 1989 and was converted from former KiHa 58 and KiHa 65 DMU cars with new bodies. In April 1990, the train was lengthened to 4 cars with the addition of KiHa 70-2.

== Formation ==
1	2	3	4
KiHa 71-1	KiHa 70-2	KiHa 70-1	KiHa 71-2

== See also ==
- Joyful Train
