= Yunohira Station =

Railway station in Yufu, Ōita Prefecture, Japan

Yunohira Station 湯平駅
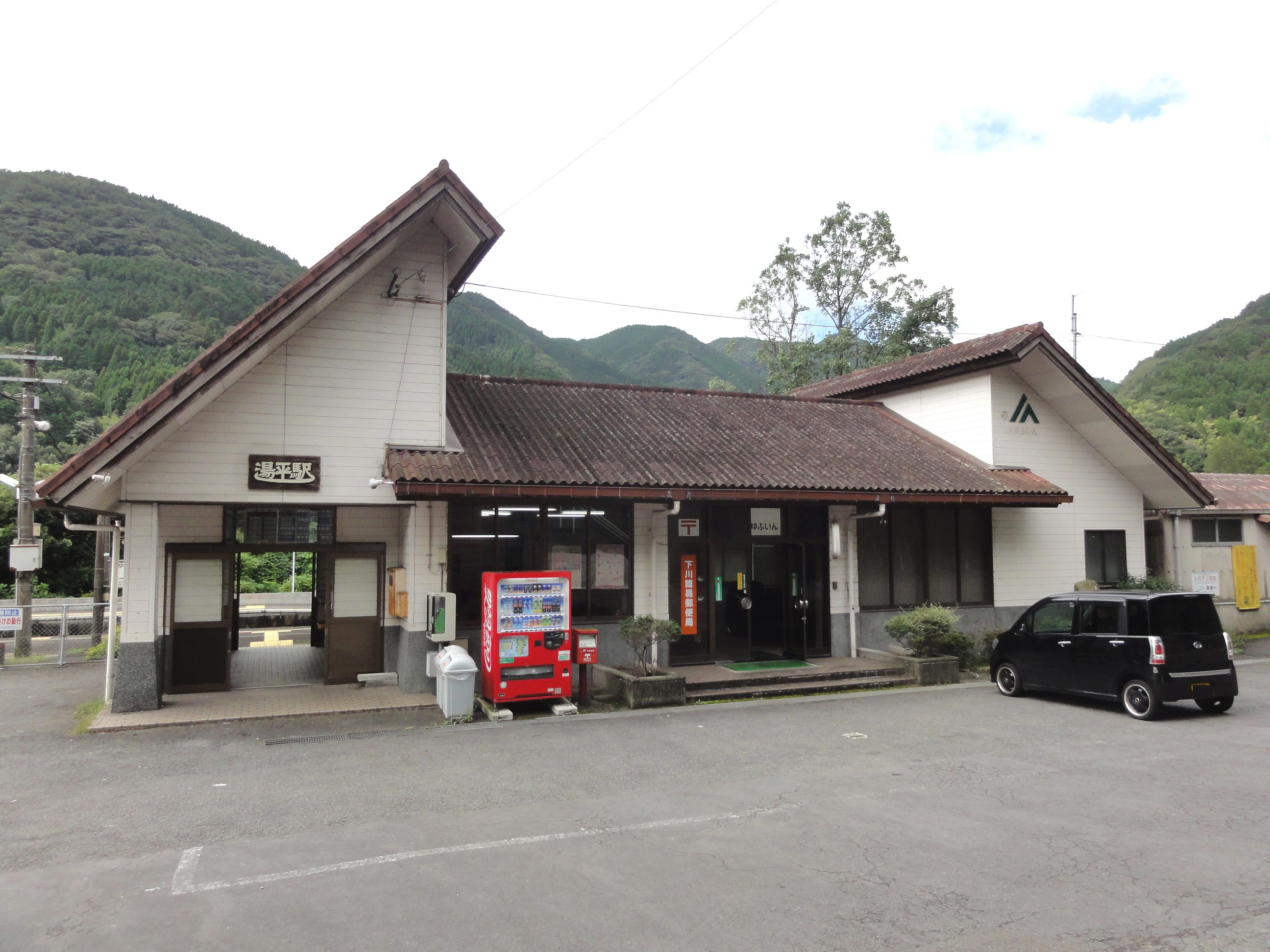
- Yunohira Station in September 2011

General information
- Location: Yufuinchō, Shimoyunohira, Yufu-shi, Ōita-ken 879-5111; Japan
- Coordinates: 33°11′51″N 131°21′15″E
- Operator: JR Kyushu
- Line: ■ Kyūdai Main Line
- Distance: 109.6 km from Kurume
- Platforms: 2 side platforms
- Tracks: 2 + 1 siding

Construction
- Structure type: At grade

Other information
- Status: Unstaffed
- Website: Official website

History
- Opened: 29 September 1923

Passengers
- FY2015: 29 daily

Services
| Preceding station | JR Kyushu | Following station |
|---|---|---|
| Minami-Yufu towards Kurume | Kyūdai Main Line | Shōnai towards Ōita |
Location
- Location within Oita Prefecture Location within Japan

Yunohira Station (湯平駅, Yunohira-eki) is a passenger railway station located in Yufuin neighborhood of the city of Yufu, Ōita Prefecture, Japan, operated by JR Kyushu.

== Lines ==
The station is served by the Kyūdai Main Line and is located 109.6 km from the starting point of the line at Kurume.

== Layout ==
The station consists of two side platforms serving two tracks at grade. A siding branches off track 1. The station building is a simple wooden structure of modern design which is colocated with a post-office. The station itself is unstaff and the premises serve only as a waiting room. Access to the opposite side platform is by means of a footbridge. Platform 2 has a small enclosed waiting room of its own.

=== Platforms ===
| 1 | ■ ■ Kyūdai Main Line | for Ōita |
| 2 | ■ ■ Kyūdai Main Line | for Yufuin and Hita |

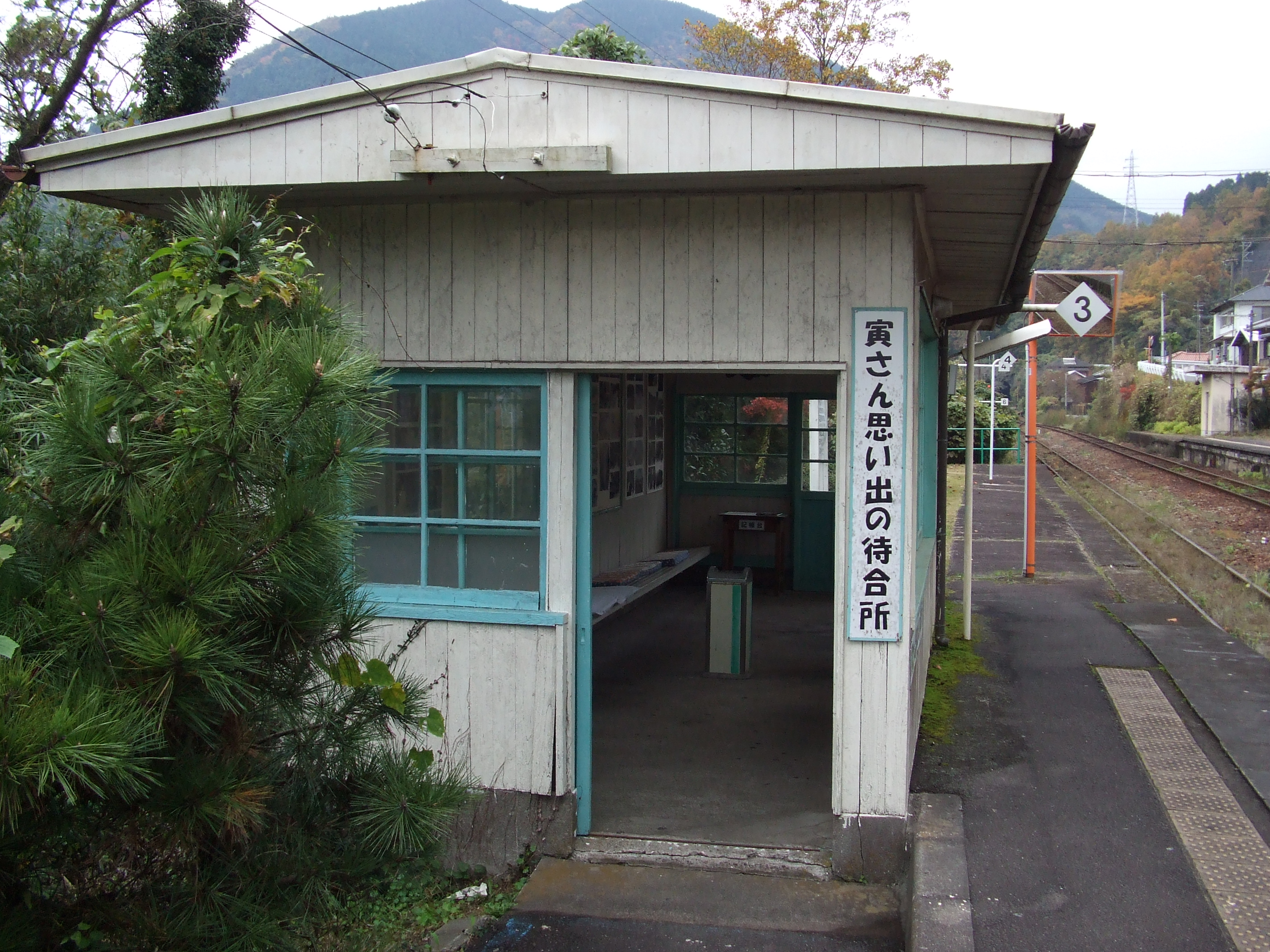
The waiting room on platform 2.

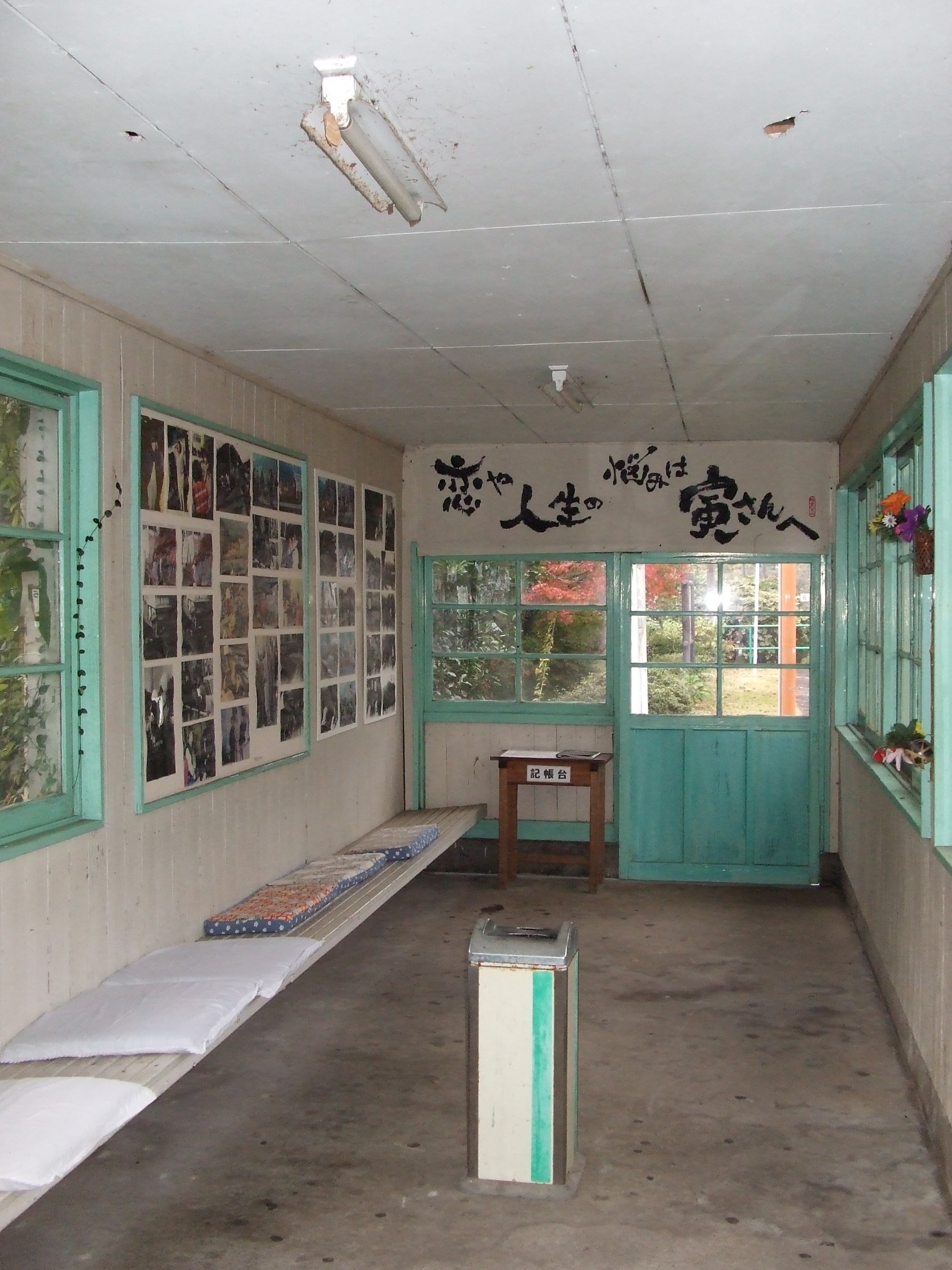
Interior view of the platform 2 waiting room.

== History ==
The private Daito Railway (大湯鉄道) had opened a track between Ōita and Onoya in 1915. The Daito Railway was nationalized on 1 December 1922, after which Japanese Government Railways (JGR) undertook the next phase of expansion of what it designated as the Daito Line, extending the track and opening Yunohira as the new western terminus on 29 September 1923. Yunohira became a through-station on 29 July 1925 when the track was further extended to Kita-Yufuin (today Yufuin. On 15 November 1934, when the Daito Line had linked up with the Kyudai Main Line further west, JGR designated the station as part of the Kyudai Main Line. With the privatization of Japanese National Railways (JNR), the successor of JGR, on 1 April 1987, the station came under the control of JR Kyushu.

== Passenger statistics ==
In fiscal 2015, there were a total of 10,749 boarding passengers, giving a daily average of 29 passengers.

== Surrounding area ==
- Yunohira Onsen
- Japan National Route 210

== See also ==
- List of railway stations in Japan
