= Yufuin no Mori =

Japanese limited express train service

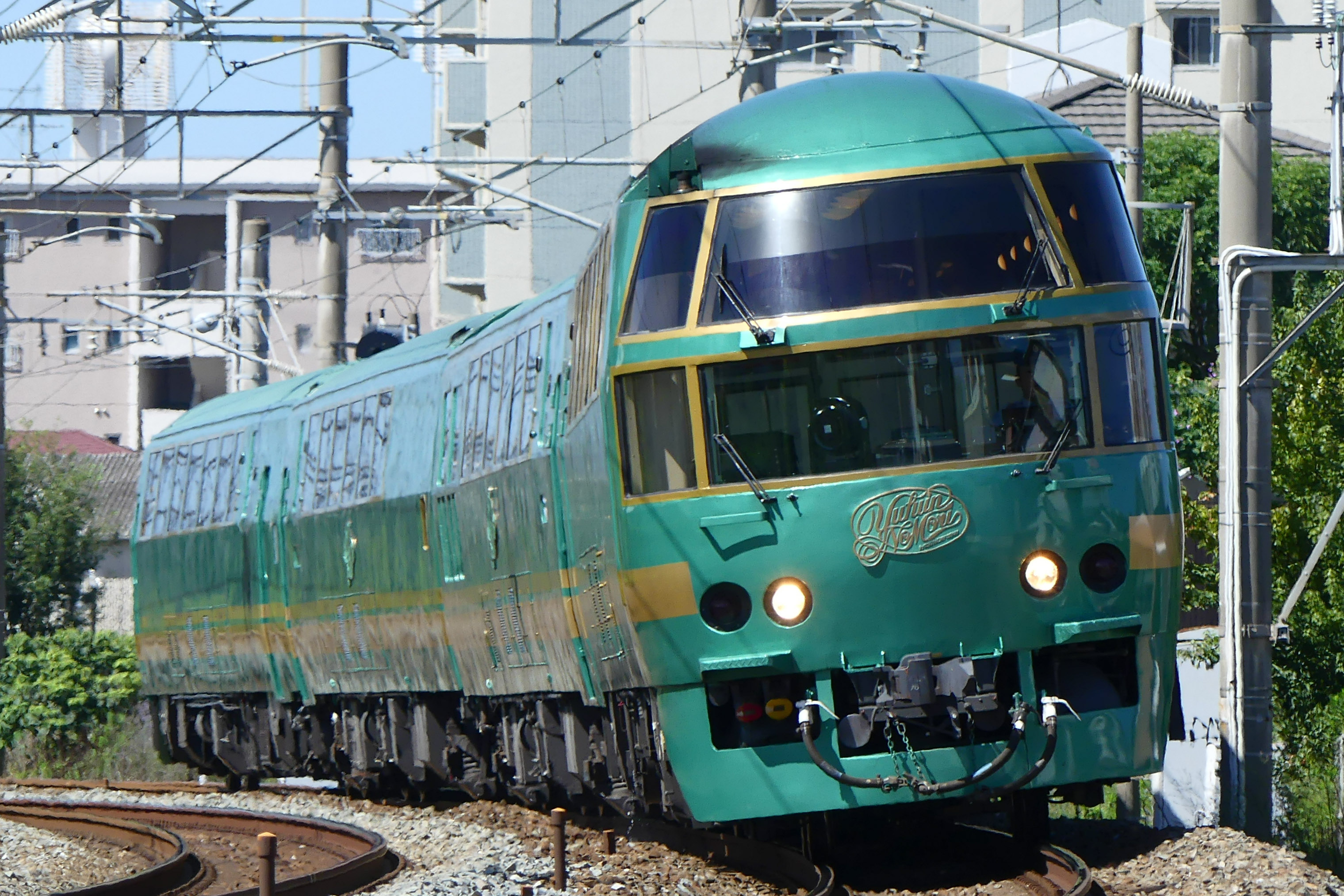
- KiHa 71 Yufuin no Mori DMU set

Overview
- Service type: Limited express
- First service: March 11, 1989

Route
- Termini: Hakata; Beppu
- Stops: Yufuin
- Lines used: Kyudai Main Line; Kagoshima Main Line; Nippo Main Line

Technical
- Rolling stock: KiHa 71 series
- Track gauge: 1,067 mm (3 ft 6 in)

Yufuin no Mori (ゆふいんの森; The Forest of Yufuin), Yufu DX (ゆふDX), and Yufu (ゆふ) are limited express train services operated by Kyushu Railway Company (JR Kyushu) which run from Hakata via Yufuin to Ōita and Beppu on the Kyudai Main Line.

== Rolling stock ==
- KiHa 71 series DMU: 1989–present (Yufuin no Mori)
- KiHa 72 series DMU: 1999–present (New Yufuin no Mori)
- KiHa 183-1000 DMU:

1992–1999 (Yufuin no Mori II)
2004–2011 (Yufu DX) Withdrawn 10 January 2011.

- KiHa 185 series DMU: 1992–present (Yufu)
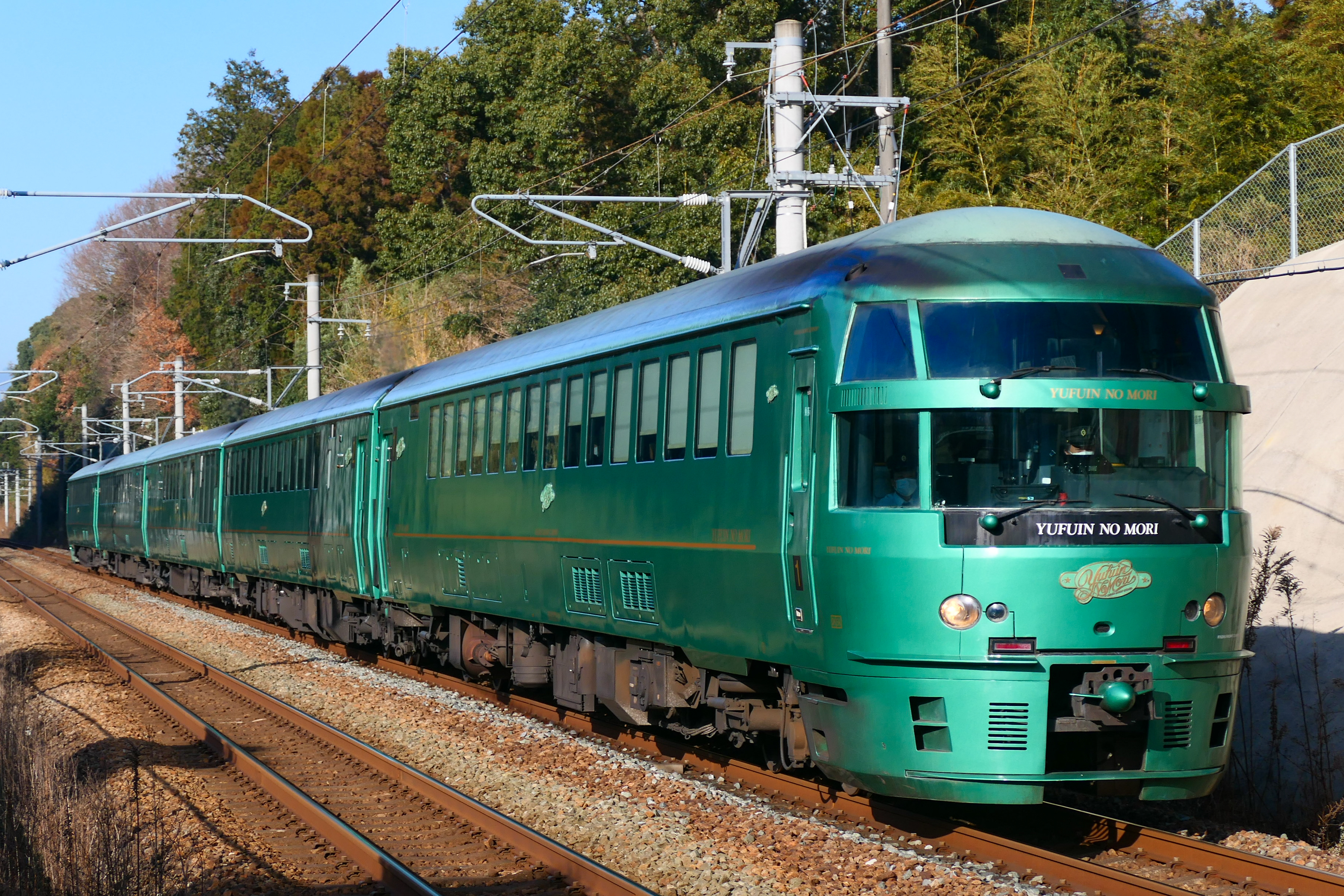
KiHa 72 New Yufuin no Mori DMU, January 2023

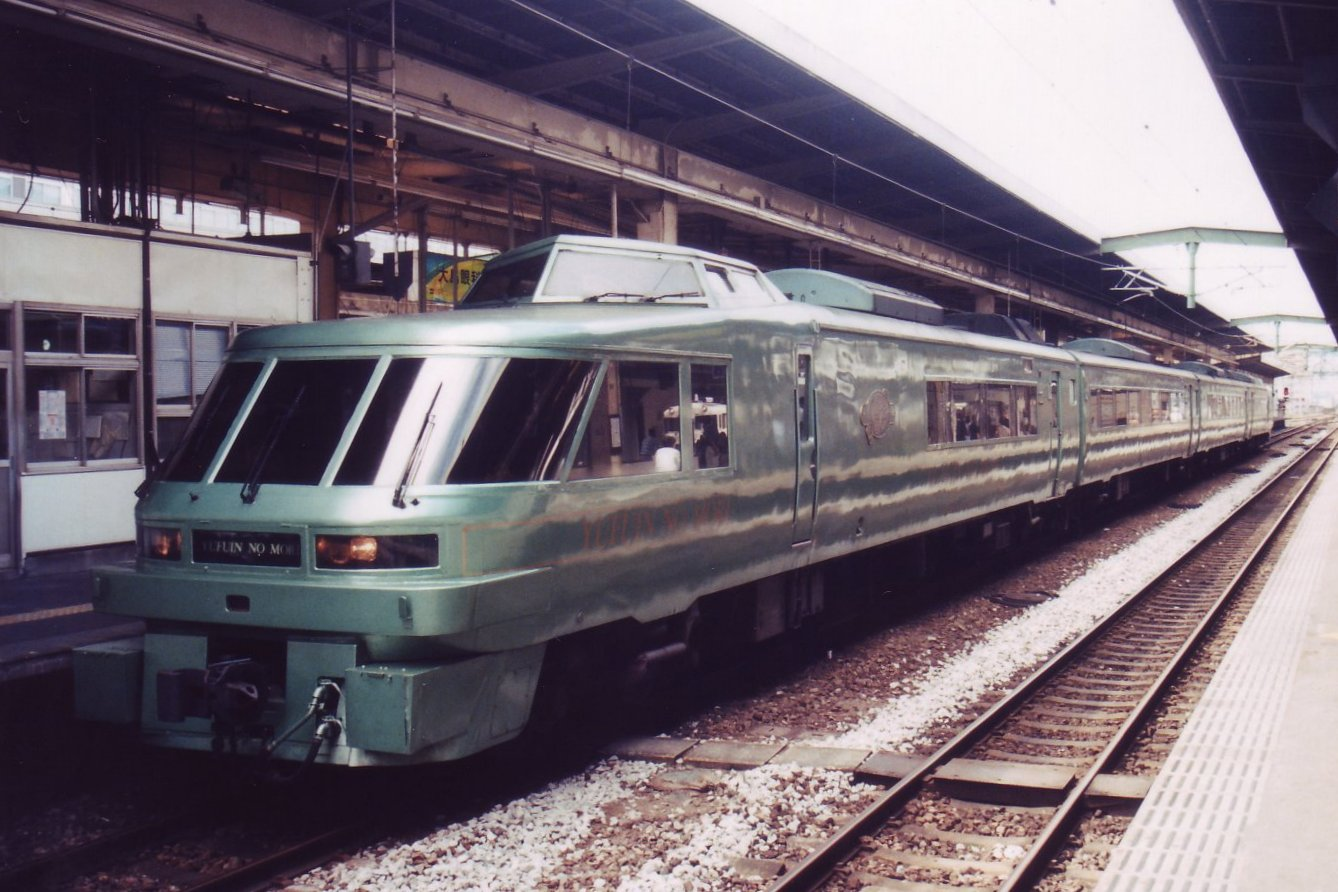
KiHa 183-1000 Yufuin no Mori II, July 1998

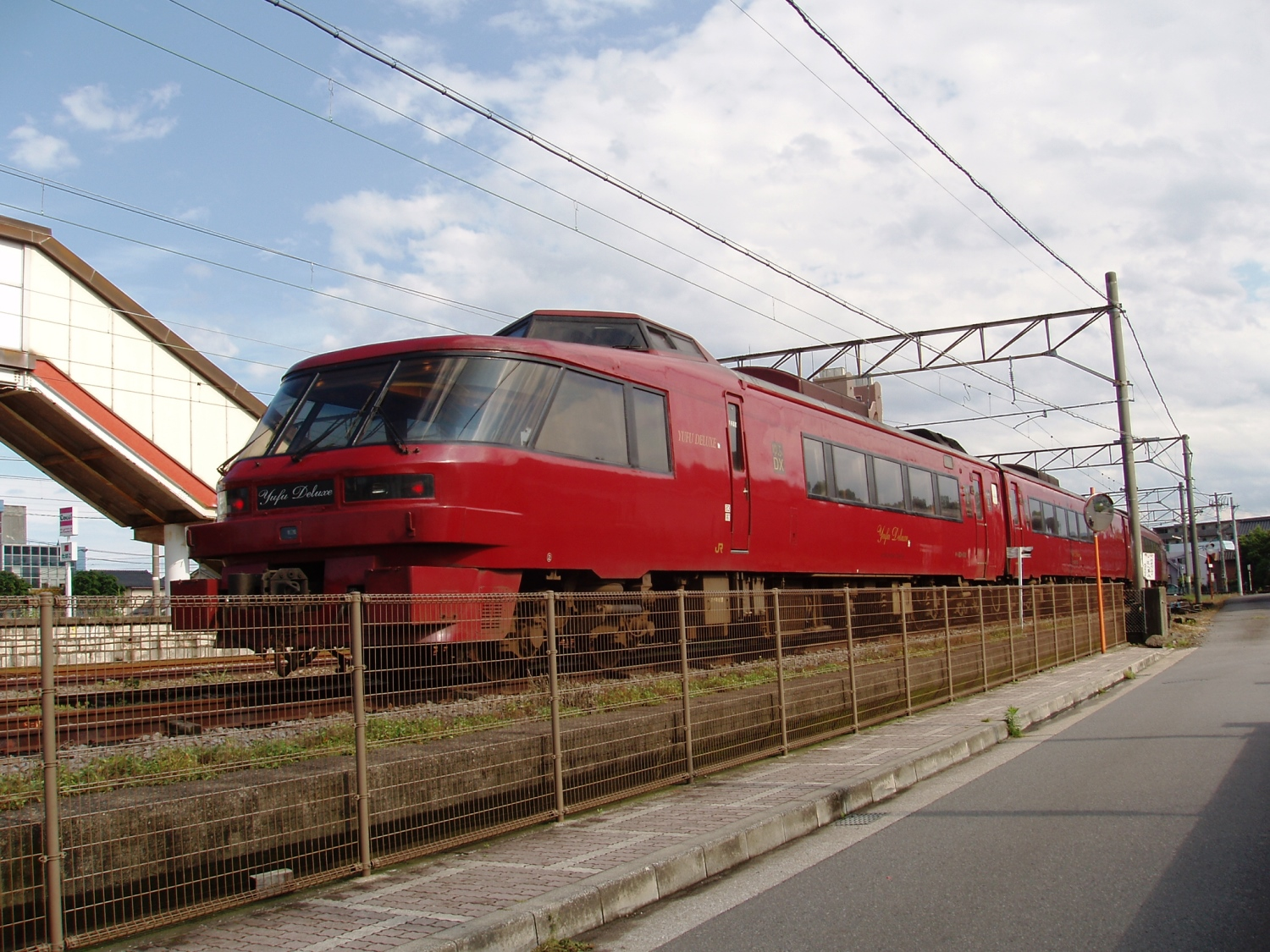
KiHa 183-1000 Yufu DX in original red livery, May 2006

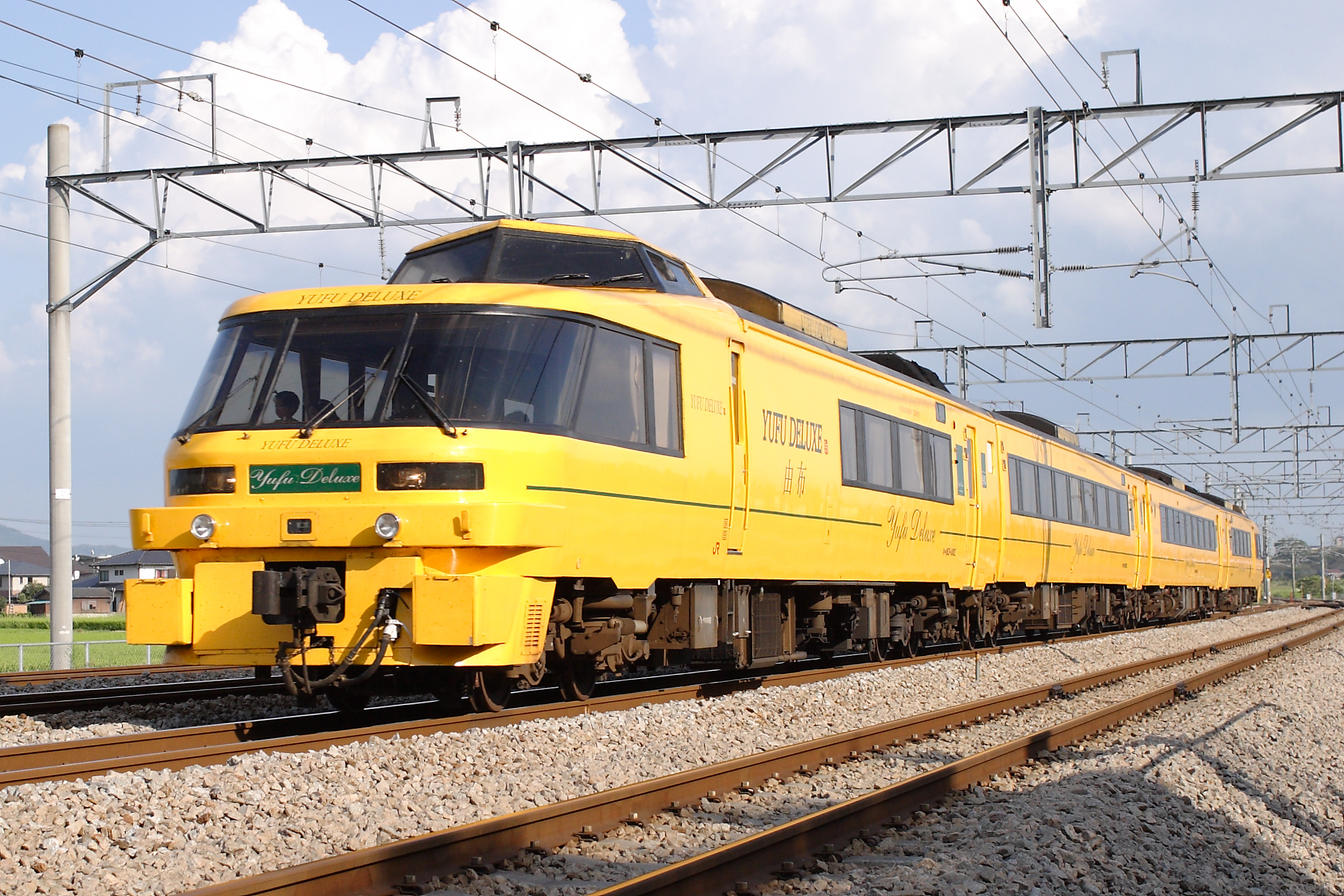
KiHa 183-1000 Yufu DX in later yellow livery, September 2009

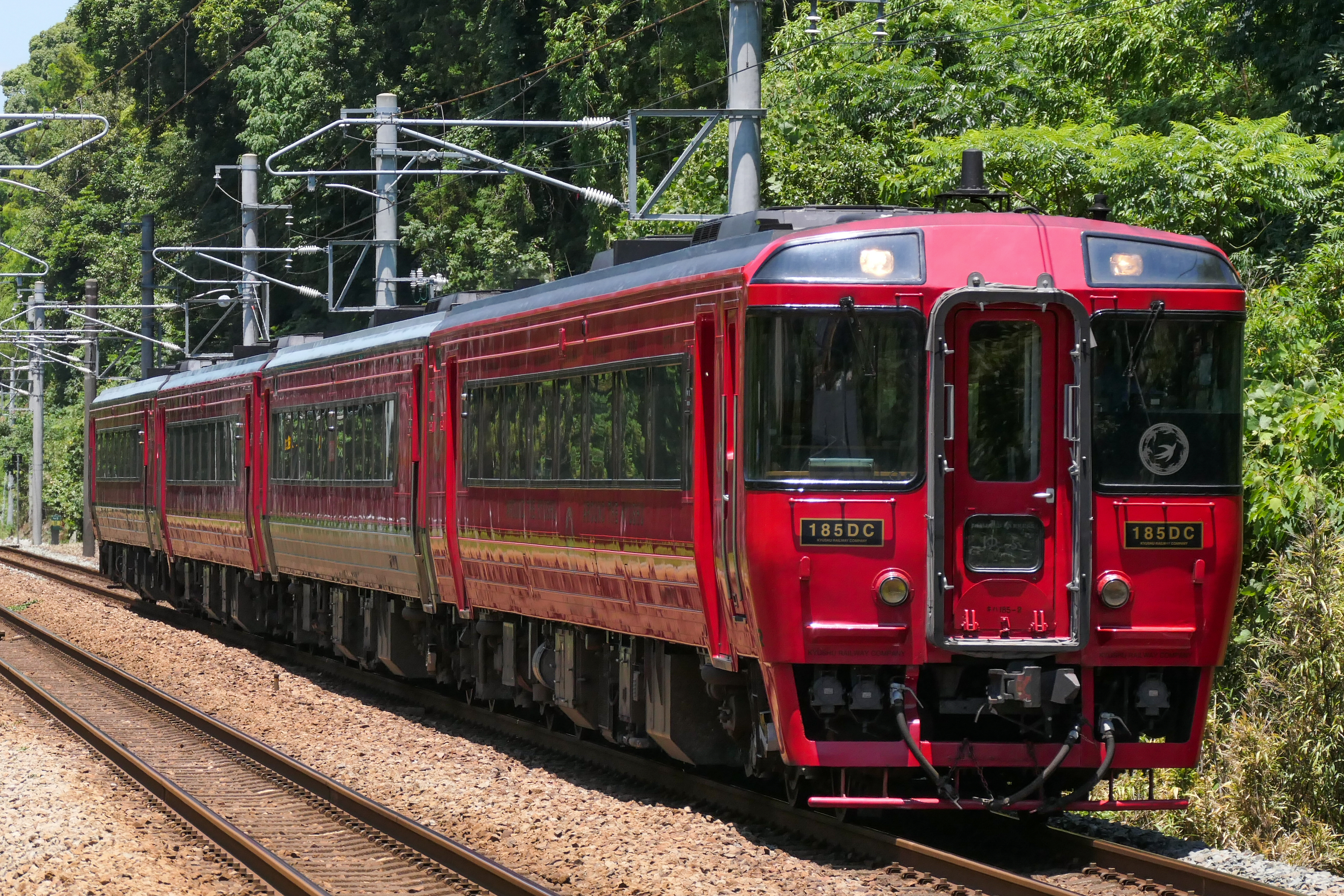
KiHa 185 series Yufu, June 2019

== Ekiben ==
The exclusive ekiben, Yufuin no Mori Bento, can only be purchased onboard this service. It contains Yufuin rice and vegetables, sesame tofu, and chicken miso.

== See also ==
- Joyful Train
