= Minami-Yufu Station =

Railway station in Yufu, Ōita Prefecture, Japan

Minami-Yufu Station 南由布駅
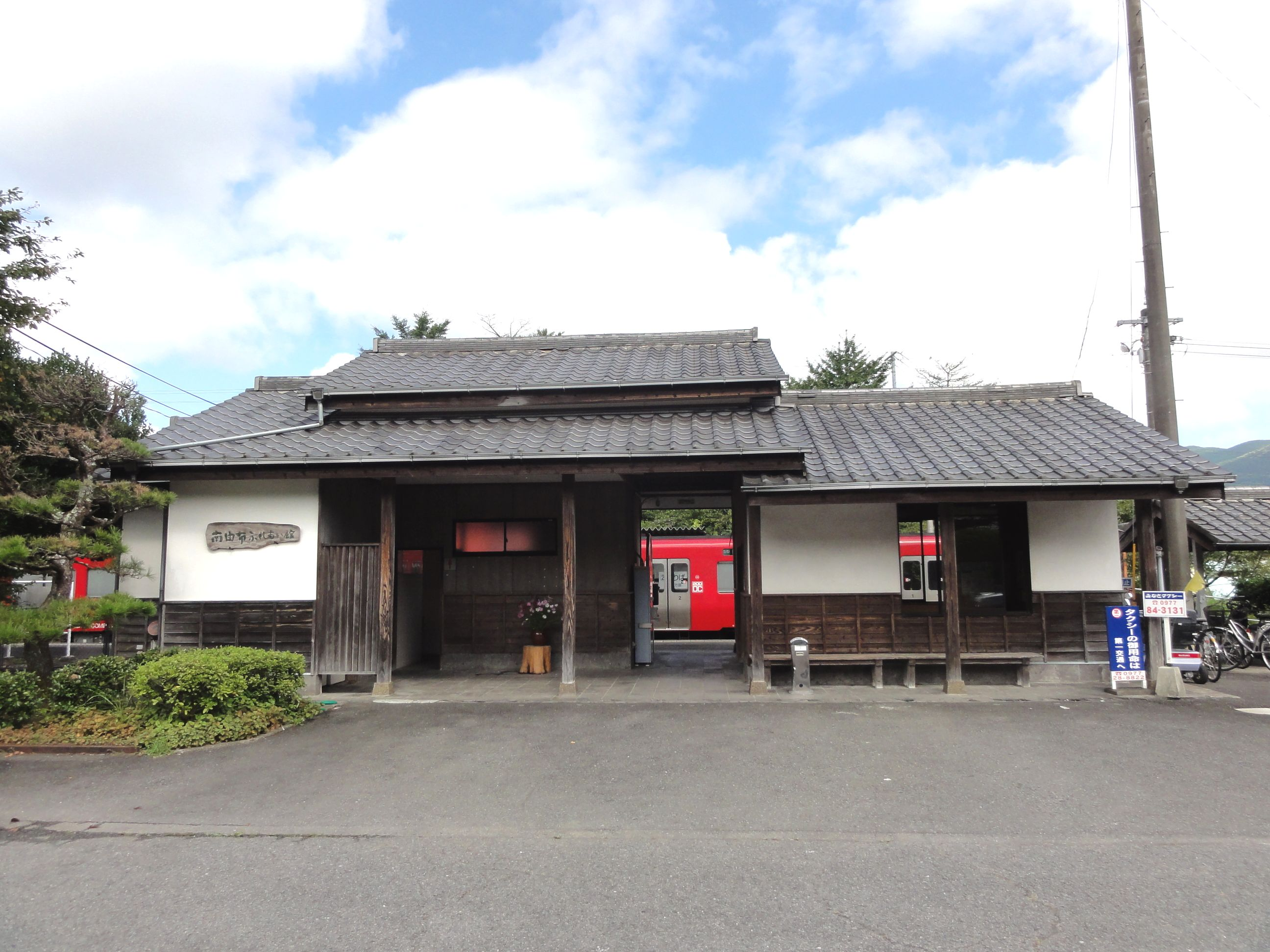
- Minami-Yufu Station in 2011

General information
- Other names: Yufuinchō, Nakagawa, Yufu-shi, Ōita-ken 879-5104
- Location: Japan
- Coordinates: 33°14′32″N 131°20′01″E
- Operator: JR Kyushu
- Line: ■ Kyūdai Main Line
- Distance: 102.5 km from Kurume
- Platforms: 2 side platforms
- Tracks: 2

Construction
- Structure type: At grade
- Cycle facilities: Bike shed

Other information
- Status: Unstaffed
- Website: Official website

History
- Opened: 29 July 1925

Passengers
- FY2015: 51 daily

Services
Preceding station	JR Kyushu	Following station
Yufuin towards Kurume	Kyūdai Main Line	Yunohira towards Ōita
Location
- Location within Oita Prefecture Location within Japan

Minami-Yufu Station (南由布駅, Minami-Yufu-eki) is a passenger railway station located in Yufuin neighborhood of the city of Yufu, Ōita Prefecture, Japan, operated by JR Kyushu.

== Lines ==
The station is served by the Kyūdai Main Line and is located 102.5 km from the starting point of the line at Kurume.

== Layout ==
The station consists of two side platforms serving two tracks at grade. The station building, a wooden strutre of traditional Japanese design with white plaster walls and a tiled roof, is unstaffed and serves only to house a waiting room and an automatic ticket vending machine. Access to the opposite side platform is by means of a level crossing with ramps. Next to the station building is a bike shed with a tiled roof to match.

=== Platforms ===
1	■ ■ Kyūdai Main Line	for Ōita
2	■ ■ Kyūdai Main Line	for Yufuin and Hita

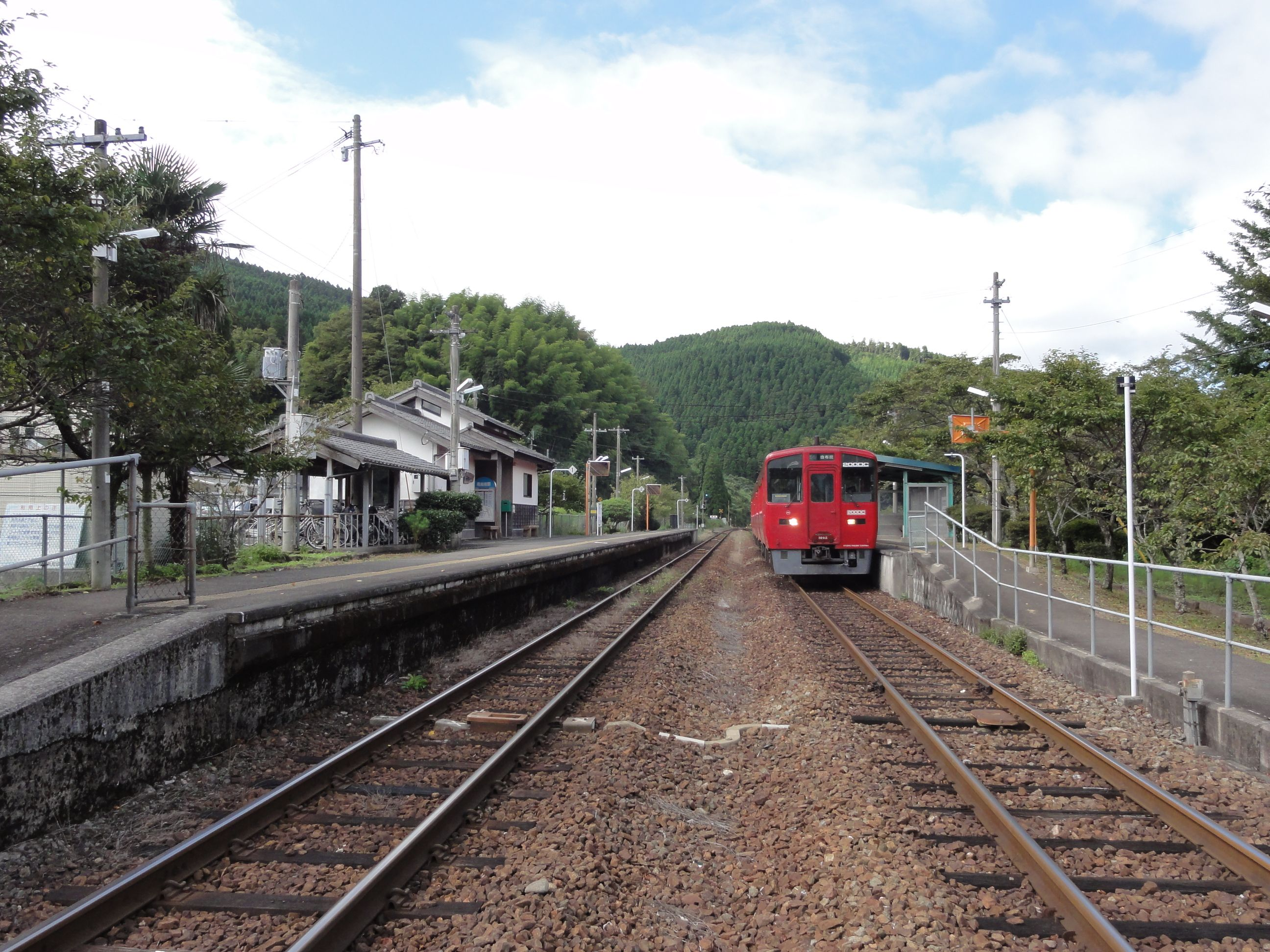
A view of the station platforms and tracks. Note the bike shed to the left.

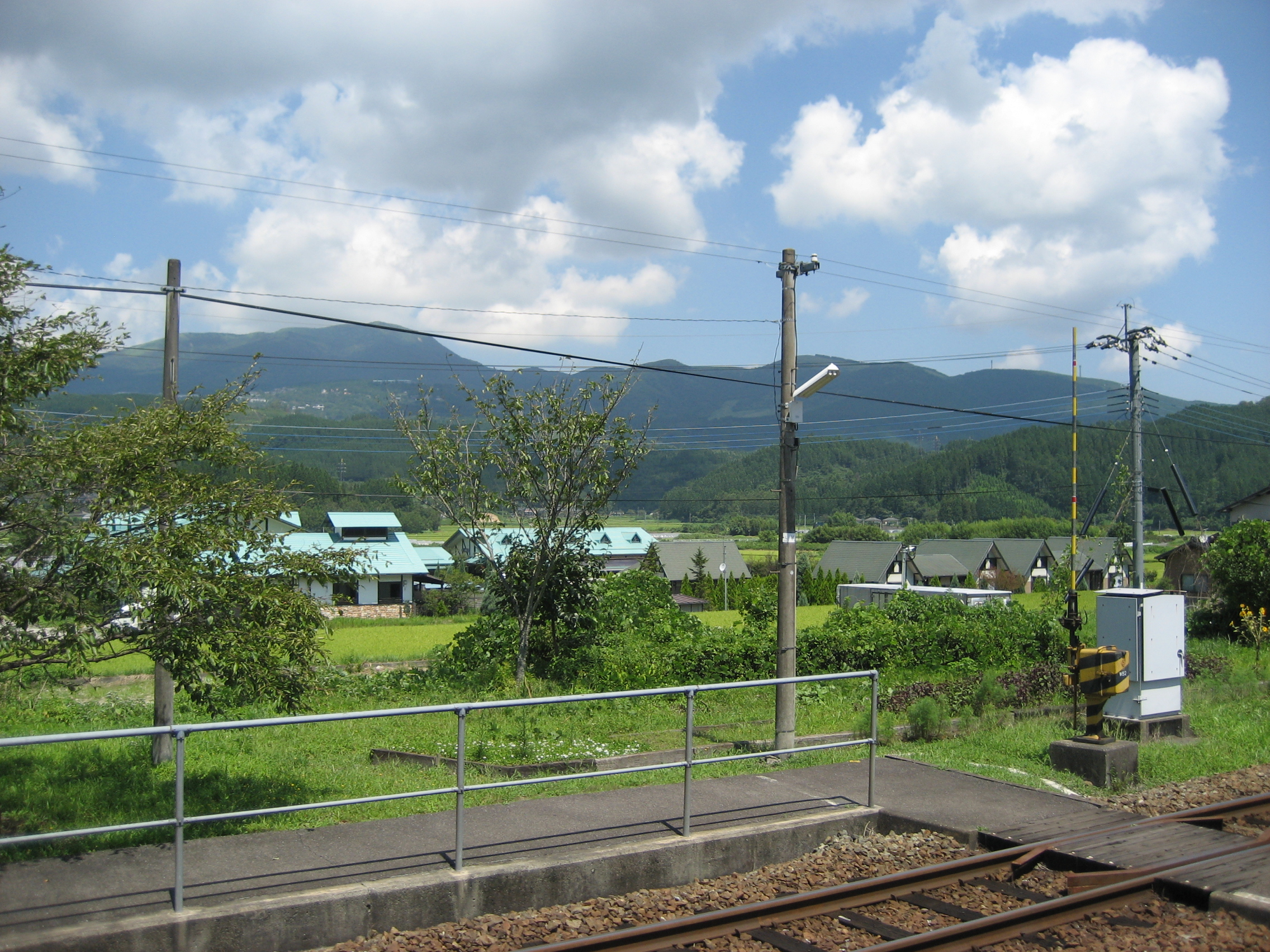
Detail of the level crossing.

== History ==
The private Daito Railway (大湯鉄道) had opened a track between Ōita and Onoya in 1915. The Daito Railway was nationalized on 1 December 1922, after which Japanese Government Railways (JGR) undertook phased westward expansion of the track which, at the time, it had designated as the Daito Line. By 1923, the track had reached Yunohira and then, on 29 July 1925, Yufuin (then known as Kita-Yufuin) was established as the new western terminus. Minami-Yufu was opened on the same day as an intermediate station along the new track. On 15 November 1934, when the Daito Line had linked up with the Kyudai Main Line further west, JGR designated the station as part of the Kyudai Main Line. With the privatization of Japanese National Railways (JNR), the successor of JGR, on 1 April 1987, the station came under the control of JR Kyushu.

== Passenger statistics ==
In fiscal 2015, there were a total of 18,548 boarding passengers, giving a daily average of 51 passengers.

== Surrounding area ==
- Japan National Route 210

== See also ==
- List of railway stations in Japan
