= Yufuin Station =

Railway station in Yufu, Ōita Prefecture, Japan

Yufuin Station 由布院駅
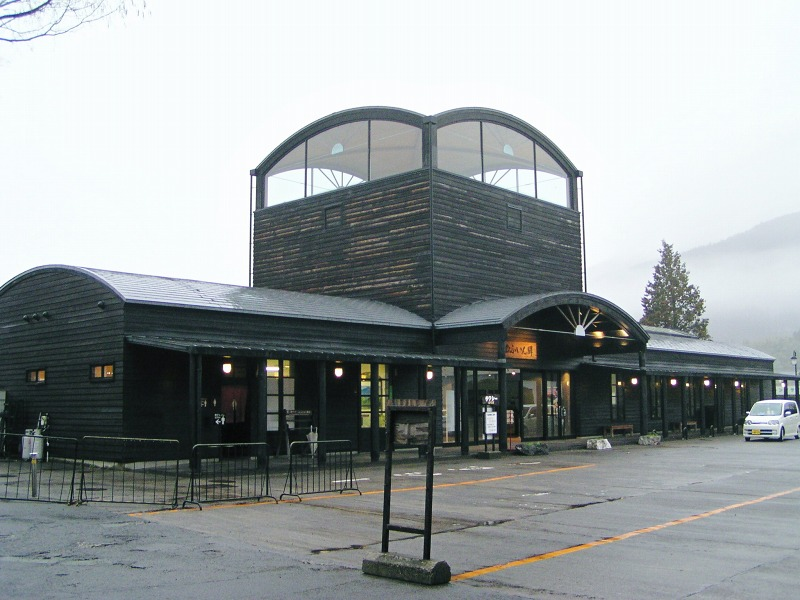
- Yufuin Station in March 2005

General information
- Location: 8-2 Yufuinchō Kawakita, Yufu-shi, Ōita-ken 879-5114; Japan
- Coordinates: 33°15′45.42″N 131°21′18.33″E
- Operator: JR Kyushu
- Line: ■ Kyūdai Main Line
- Distance: 99.1 km from Kurume
- Platforms: 1 side + 1 island platforms
- Tracks: 3

Construction
- Structure type: At grade
- Accessible: Yes

Other information
- Status: Staffed (Midori no Madoguchi)
- Website: Official website

History
- Opened: 29 July 1925
- Former names: Kita-Yufuin (to 1950)

Passengers
- FY2016: 1167 daily
- Rank: 144th (among JR Kyushu stations)

Services
Preceding station	JR Kyushu	Following station
Noya towards Kurume	Kyūdai Main Line	Minami-Yufu towards Ōita
Location
- Location within Oita Prefecture Location within Japan

Yufuin Station (由布院駅, Yufuin-eki) is a passenger railway station located in Yufuin neighborhood of the city of Yufu, Ōita Prefecture, Japan, operated by JR Kyushu.

== Lines ==
Yufuin Station is served by the Kyudai Main Line and is located 99.1 km from the starting point of the line at Kurume.

=== Limited express services ===
- Yufuin-no-mori, Yufu (Hakata - Beppu)

== Station layout ==
Yufuin Station has one side platform adjacent to the station building and one island platform and one siding. In addition to footbridges, the platforms are connected by slopes and level crossings making them wheelchair accessible.The station has a Midori no Madoguchi staffed ticket office and there is a Yufuin Onsen tourist information center within the station building.

The station building was completed in 1990. It was designed by Arata Isozaki, an architect from Oita Prefecture, and is inspired by a chapel. It has a wooden, black-painted exterior, with a 12 meter high open concourse in the center, and an adjacent waiting room that doubles as an event hall. The concourse and platform can be separated by large, thick glass doors to prevent wind, and the waiting room has floor heating equipment that uses hot spring water.

=== Platforms ===
1, 2, 3	■ ■ Kyūdai Main Line	for Hita and Kurume for Ōita

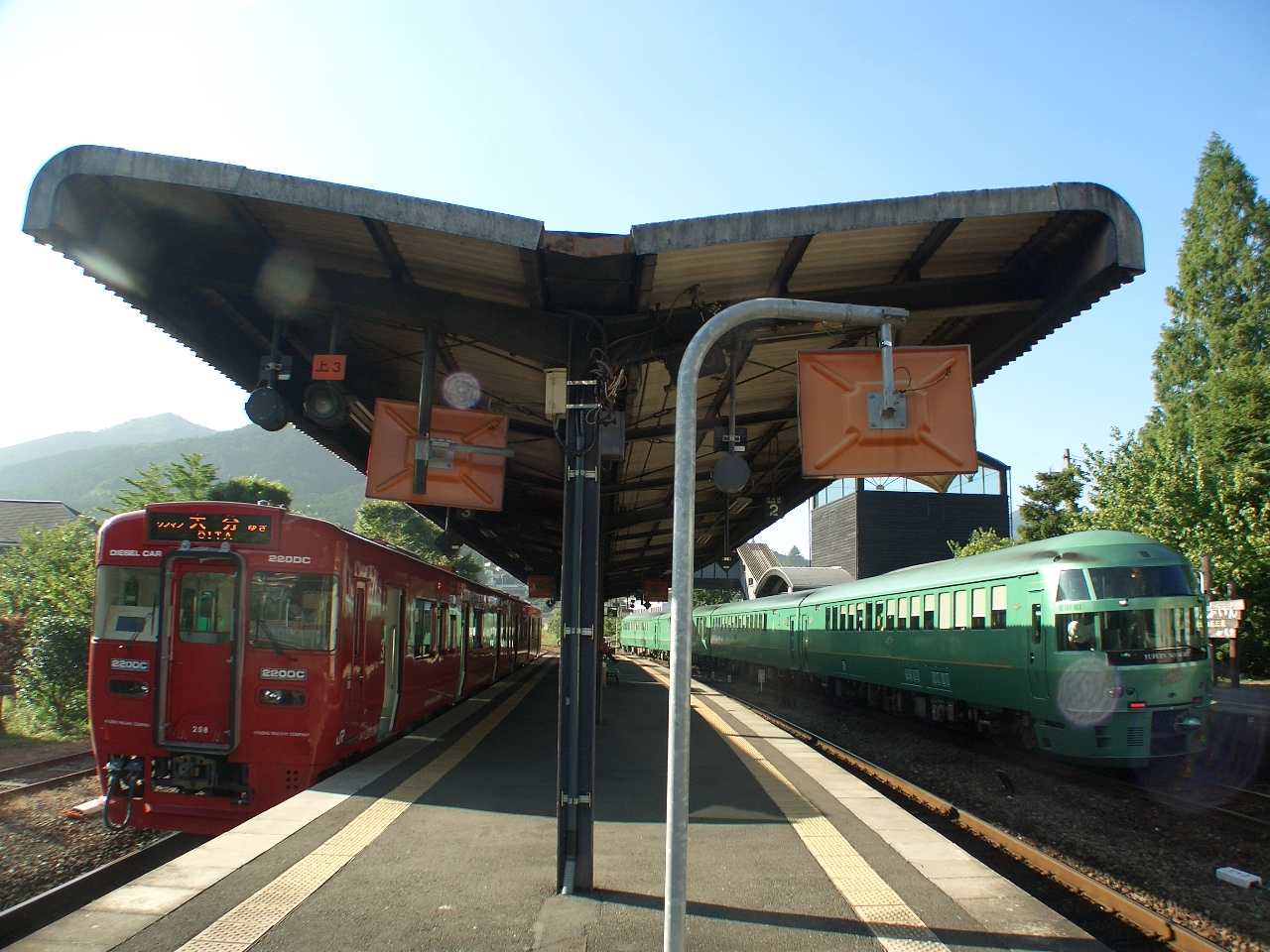
The platforms

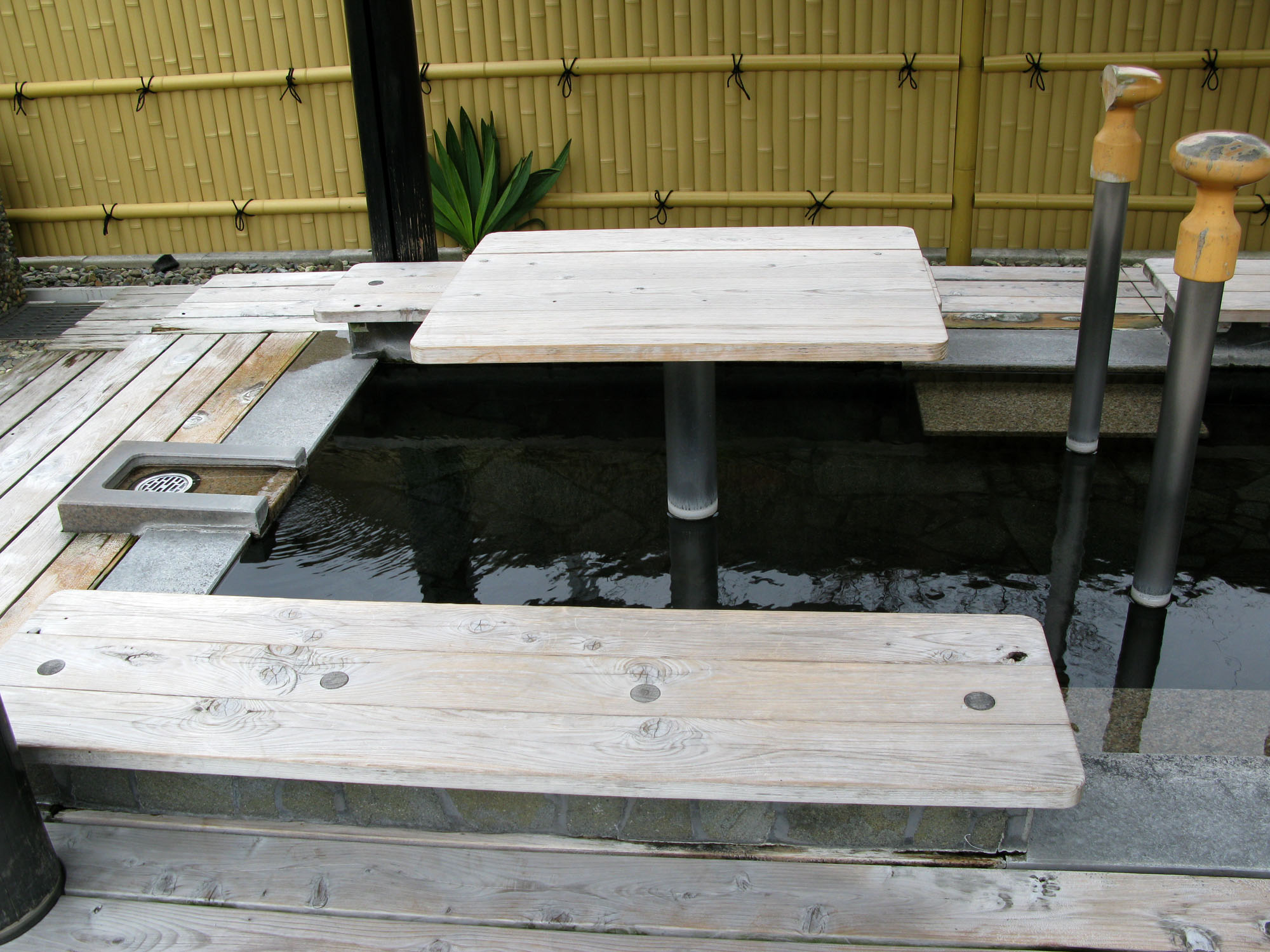
Foot spa on the platform

== History ==
The private Daito Railway (大湯鉄道) had opened a track between Ōita and Onoya in 1915. The Daito Railway was nationalized on 1 December 1922, after which Japanese Government Railways (JGR) undertook phased westward expansion of the track which, at the time, it had designated as the Daito Line. By 1923, the track had reached Yunohira and then, on 29 July 1925, Yufuin (then known as Kita-Yufuin) was established as the new western terminus. The station became a through-station on 26 November 1926 when the track was extended to Noya. On 15 November 1934, when the Daito Line had linked up with the Kyudai Main Line further west, JGR designated the station as part of the Kyudai Main Line. On 1 January 1950, the station was renamed Yufuin. With the privatization of Japanese National Railways (JNR), the successor of JGR, on 1 April 1987, the station came under the control of JR Kyushu.

== Passenger statistics ==
In fiscal 2016, the station was used by an average of 1,167 passengers daily (boarding passengers only), and it ranked 144th among the busiest stations of JR Kyushu.

== Surrounding area ==
- Yufu City Hall Yufuin Government Building (formerly Yufuin Town Hall)
- Yufuin Community Center (Yufu City Central Community Center)
- Yufuin Onsen
- Yufu City Yufuin Elementary School

== See also ==
- List of railway stations in Japan
