= Kobe Site =

- 小部遺跡 (Japanese)
- Kobe Site Kobe Site (Japan)
- Interactive map of Kobe Site
- 33°33′25″N 131°20′16″E
- Type: Settlement trace
- Periods: Kofun period
- Location: Usa, Ōita, Japan
- Region: Kyushu

History
- Built: c.5th-6th century

Site notes
- Public access: Yes (no facilities)

Kobe Site (小部遺跡) is a complex archaeological site with the traces of a Kofun period settlement, located in the Araki neighborhood of the city of Usa, Ōita, on the island of Kyushu Japan. The tumulus was designated a National Historic Site of Japan in 2021.

== Overview ==
The Kobe Site is located at the east end of a low terrace overlooking the west basin of the Tsukan River, and the Kurokuro River. It contains various remains from the late Yayoi period to the Kamakura period; however, the traces of a ring-moated settlement with pottery from the early Kofun period is particularly important. As a result of ten archaeological excavations, it is estimated that the plan of the settlement was rectangular or irregularly circular with rounded corners, approximately 120 meters on each side. On the west side, there are the traces of at least two large pillared buildings measuring 10 to 15 meters on each side, which are of a later date than the surrounding moats. The state of the buildings inside the moat is unknown because a full-scale survey has not been conducted, but as it is contemporary with the Akatsuka Kofun, the oldest tumulus in the nearby Kawabe-Takamori Kofun Cluster, it is likely to have been a settlement occupied by the local rulers whose tombs are the tumuli in that kofun cluster.

Many pieces of pottery from the Kansai region and Kibi region have been excavated from the ruins, and it is believed that it was one of the trading centers in the Seto Inland Sea.

== See also ==
- List of Historic Sites of Japan (Ōita)
