= Kogumayama Kofun =

- 小熊山古墳 (Japanese)
- Kogumayama Kofun Kogumayama Kofun (Japan)
- Interactive map of Kogumayama Kofun
- 33°24′44.86″N 131°42′00.38″E
- Type: Kofun
- Periods: Kofun period
- Location: Kitsuki, Ōita, Japan
- Region: Kyushu

History
- Built: c.3rd-4th century

Site notes
- Public access: Yes (no facilities)

The Kogumayama Kofun (小熊山古墳) is a Kofun period keyhole-shaped burial mound, located in the Karishuku neighborhood of the city of Kitsuki, Ōita Prefecture on the island of Kyushu, Japan. The tumulus, together with the nearby Otōyama Kofun were collectively designated a National Historic Site of Japan in 2017.

== Overview ==
The Kogumayama Kofun is located on a hill with an elevation of 84 meters, overlooking Beppu Bay in the southeastern part of the Kunisaki Peninsula in northern Ōita Prefecture. It was discovered in 1989. It is a zenpō-kōen-fun (前方後円墳), which is shaped like a keyhole, having one square end and one circular end, when viewed from above and is orientated facing south. The total length of the tumulus is 116.5 meters, making it one of the largest in Ōita Prefecture after the Kamezuka Kofun. The posterior circular portion was constructed in three stages, and the anterior rectangular portion was constructed in two stages. The interior of the kofun has not been excavated, so details of the burial chamber is unknown; however, an electrical resistance survey indicated the possibility of two burials. Excavated artifacts include pot-shaped and cylindrical haniwa, and the cylindrical haniwa in particular has a tomoe-shaped opening and is the oldest early cylindrical haniwa in discovered in Kyushu. From these artifacts, it is estimated that the tumulus was constructed from the late 3rd century to the beginning of the 4th century, or in the early Kofun period, and thus is earlier than the Otōyama Kofun, approximately 500 meters to the south.

== See also ==
- List of Historic Sites of Japan (Ōita)
