= List of historic sites of Japan (Ōita) =

This list is of the historic sites of Japan located within the Prefecture of Ōita.

== National Historic Sites ==
As of 27 January 2025, forty-eight Sites have been designated as being of national significance (including one *Special Historic Site).

Site	Municipality	Comments	Image	Coordinates	Type	Ref.
*Usuki Stone Buddhas 臼杵磨崖仏 Usuki magaibutsu	Usuki	Heian to Kamakura period stone carvings; designation includes the Hiyoshi tō and two gorintō dating to 1170 and 1172	Usuki Stone Buddhas	33°05′22″N 131°45′47″E	1	2860
Garandoya Kofun ガランドヤ古墳 Garandoya Kofun	Hita	Kofun period tumulus	Garandoya Kofun	33°18′51″N 130°54′20″E	1	2898
Ankokuji Village Ruins 安国寺集落遺跡 Anakannon Kofun	Kunisaki	Yayoi period settlement ruins	Ankokuji Village Ruins	33°34′02″N 131°42′53″E	1	2897
Usa Jingū precincts 宇佐神宮境内 Usa Jingū keidai	Kunisaki	ancient Shinto shrine	Usa Jingū precincts	33°31′28″N 131°22′38″E	3	2896
Yokoo Shell Mound 横尾貝塚 Yokoo kaizuka	Ōita (city)	Jōmon period shell midden		33°31′28″N 131°22′38″E	1	00003626
Oka Castle ruins 岡城跡 Oka-jō ato	Taketa	Edo period castle ruins	Oka Castle ruins	32°58′09″N 131°24′28″E	2	2873
Oka Domain Nakagawa clan cemetery 岡藩主中川家墓所 Oka han-shu Nakagawa-ke bosho	Taketa, Bungo-ōno	Edo period daimyo cemetery		32°58′21″N 131°24′08″E	7	2901
Shimoyama Kofun 下山古墳 Shimoyama Kofun	Usuki	Kofun period tumulus	Shimoyama Kofun	33°07′59″N 131°47′34″E	1	2879
Tsunomure Castle ruins 下山古墳 Tsunomure-jō ato	Kusu	Muromachi - Sengoku period castle ruins	Tsunomure Castle ruins	33°18′32″N 131°09′17″E	2	3425
Kuzuhara Kofun 葛原古墳 Kuzuhara Kofun	Usa	Kofun period tumulus	Kuzuhara Kofun	33°32′27″N 131°20′10″E	1	2881
Iwato Site 岩戸遺跡 Iwato Site	Bungo-ōno	Japanese Palaeolithic Site		32°58′56″N 131°32′46″E	1	2894
Oni-no-iwa Kofun 鬼ノ岩屋古墳 Oni-no-iwa Kofun	Beppu	Kofun period tumulus		33°18′56″N 131°29′32″E	1	2880
Onizuka Kofun 鬼塚古墳 Onizuka Kofun	Kunisaki	Kofun period tumulus	Onizuka Kofun	33°40′38″N 131°34′58″E	1	2883
Kamezuka Kofun 亀塚古墳 Kamezuka Kofun	Ōita (city)	Kofun period tumulus	Kamezuka Kofun	33°40′38″N 131°34′58″E	1	2899
Chikudensō Villa and Tanomura Chikuden grave 旧竹田荘附田能村竹田墓 kyū-Chikudensō tsuketari Tanomura Chikuden no haka	Taketa	Edo Period painter	Chikudensō Villa and Tanomura Chikuden grave	32°57′55″N 131°23′37″E	7, 8	2875
Kumano magaibutsu 熊野磨崖仏 Kumano magaibutsu	Bungotakada	Heian to Kamakura period carvings; designation includes Motomiya magaibutsu (元宮磨崖仏) and Nabeyama magaibutsu (鍋山磨崖仏)	Kumano magaibutsu	33°28′40″N 131°31′34″E	3	2878
Anakannon Kofun 穴観音古墳 Anakannon Kofun	Hita	Kofun period tumulus		33°18′29″N 130°54′17″E	1	2858
Inukai Stone Buddhas 犬飼石仏 Inukai sekibutsu	Bungo-ōno	Kamakura period stone carvings	Inukai Stone Buddhas	33°03′13″N 131°37′56″E	3	2862
Furumiya Kofun 古宮古墳 Furumiya Kofun	Ōita (city)	Kofun period tumulus	Furumiya Kofun	33°13′36″N 131°35′16″E	1	2895
Hirose Tansō grave and former residence 広瀬淡窓墓 Hirose Tansō no haka to kyū-taku	Hita	Edo period Confucian scholar grave and residence	Yasui Sokken grave and former residence	33°19′25″N 130°56′13″E	7	2876
Takase Stone Buddhas 高瀬石仏 Takase sekibutsu	Ōita (city)	Heian period carvings	Takase Stone Buddhas	33°10′48″N 131°34′34″E	3	2864
Miura Baien former residence 三浦梅園旧宅 Miura Baien kyū-taku	Kunisaki	Edo period Confucian scholar former residence	Miura Baien former residence	33°31′35″N 131°37′26″E	8	2885
Yokkaichi Cave Tomb Cluster 四日市横穴群 Yokkaichi yokoana-gun	Usa	Kofun period corridor tomb cluster		33°31′37″N 131°19′20″E	1	2882
Nanatsumori Kofun Cluster 七ツ森古墳群 Nanatsumori kofun-gun	Taketa	Kofun period tumuli cluster	Nanatsumori Kofun Cluster	32°57′07″N 131°18′35″E	1	2886
Ogatamiyasako West Stone Buddhas 緒方宮迫西石仏 Ogatamiyasako nishi sekibutsu	Bungo-ōno	Heian to Kamakura period stone carvings	Ogatamiyasako West Stone Buddhas	32°57′42″N 131°27′29″E	3	3331
Ogatamiyasako East Stone Buddhas 緒方宮迫東石仏 Ogatamiyasako higashi sekibutsu	Bungo-ōno	Heian to Kamakura period stone carvings	Ogatamiyasako East Stone Buddhas	32°57′49″N 131°27′32″E	3	3388
Ozakotsujibaru Site 小迫辻原遺跡 Ozakotsujibaru iseki	Hita	Kofun period settlement trace		33°20′22″N 130°55′25″E	1	2900
Sugao Stone Buddhas 菅尾石仏 Sugao sekibutsu	Bungo-ōno	Heian period stone carvings	Sugao Stone Buddhas	33°01′27″N 131°36′58″E	3	2863
Chiyomaru Kofun 千代丸古墳 Chiyomaru Kofun	Ōita (city)	Kofun period tumulus	Chiyomaru Kofun	33°13′13″N 131°32′36″E	1	2867
Kawabe-Takamori Kofun Cluster 川部・高森古墳群 Kawabe-Takamori kofun-gun	Usa	Kofun period tumulus cluster	Kawabe-Takamori Kofun Cluster	33°32′33″N 131°21′57″E	1	2893
Ōita Motomachi Stone Buddhas 大分元町石仏 Ōita motomachi sekibutsu	Ōita (city)	Heian period stone carvings	Ōita Motomachi Stone Buddhas	33°13′14″N 131°36′56″E	3	2861
Ōtomo clan Sites 大友氏遺跡 Ōtomo-shi iseki	Ōita (city)	Sengoku period sites associated with the Ōtomo clan, including the Uenoharu Yakata (上原館) and the site of Manju-ji (旧万寿寺跡)	Ōtomo clan sites	33°13′49″N 131°37′05″E	2	3307
Tsukiyama Kofun 築山古墳 Tsukiyama Kofun	Ōita (city)	Kofun period tumulus		33°14′20″N 131°48′05″E	1	2872
Chōja Yashiki Kanga ruins 長者屋敷官衙遺跡 Chōja yashiki kanga iseki	Nakatsu	Nara-Heian period Kanga ruins		33°34′04″N 131°12′20″E	2	00003664
Former Residence of Fukuzawa Yukichi 福沢諭吉旧居 Fukuzawa Yukichi kyūkyo	Nakatsu	Meiji period leader birthplace	Former Residence of Fukuzawa Yukichi	33°36′26″N 131°11′27″E	8	2889
Hōonjiyama Kofun Cluster 法恩寺山古墳群 Hōonjiyama kofun-gun	Hita	Kofun period tumulus cluster		33°18′38″N 130°56′59″E	1	2884
Hōkyō-ji temple ruins 法鏡寺廃寺跡 Hōkyōji haiji ato	Usa	Asuka Period temple ruins		33°31′42″N 131°20′43″E	3	2892
Bungo Kokubun-ji ruins 豊後国分寺跡 Bungo Kokubun-ji ato	Ōita (city)	Nara period provincial temple of Bungo Province	Bungo Kokubun-ji ruins	33°11′41″N 131°33′15″E	3	2859
Kangi-en site 咸宜園跡 Kangien ato	Hita	Bakumatsu period academy	Kangi-en site	33°19′22″N 130°56′06″E	4	2857
Fuki-ji Precincts 富貴寺境内 Fukiji keidai	Bungotakada	Nara period temple	Fuki-ji precincts	33°32′16″N 131°31′44″E	3	00003824
Kogumayama Kofun - Otōyama Kofun 小熊山古墳・御塔山古墳 Kogumayama Kofun - Otōyama Kofun	Kitsuki	Konfun period tumuli		33°24′45″N 131°42′00″E	2	00003971
Shimofuji Kirishitan cemetery 下藤キリシタン墓地 Shimofuji Kirishitan bochi	Usuki	Sengoku to early Edo Period Kirishitan graves		33°03′02″N 131°40′59″E	2	00004045
Kitsuki Castle ruins 杵築城跡 Kitsuki-jō ato	Kitsuki	Edo Period castle ruins	Kitsuki Castle ruins	33°24′57″N 131°37′36″E	2	00004102
Kobe Site 小部遺跡 Kobe iseki	Usa	Kofun period settlement traces		33°33′25″N 131°20′16″E	1	00004120
Sato Kanga ruins 里官衙遺跡 Sato kanga iseki	Ōita (city)	Nara period administrative center ruins		33°24′57″N 131°37′36″E	1	00004169
Saiki Castle ruins 佐伯城跡 Saiki-jō ato	Saiki	Edo Period castle ruins	Saiki Castle ruins	32°57′36″N 131°53′23″E	1	00004176
Rokugōzan 六郷山; Rokugōzan	Kunisaki, Bungotakada			33°34′43″N 131°32′26″E		
Usuki Castle Site 臼杵城跡; Usuki-jō ato	Usuki			33°07′17″N 131°48′15″E		

== Prefectural Historic Sites ==
As of 1 May 2024, one hundred and seven Sites have been designated as being of prefectural importance.

Site	Municipality	Comments	Image	Coordinates	Type	Ref.
Zuigan-ji Stone Buddhas 瑞巌寺磨崖仏; Zuiganji magaibutsu	Kokonoe			33°15′56″N 131°10′52″E		for all refs see
Aonodōmon 青の洞門; Ao-no-dōmon	Nakatsu			33°30′00″N 131°10′19″E		
Usuzuka Kofun 臼塚古墳; Usuzuka kofun	Usuki			33°08′36″N 131°47′10″E		
Hara Kirishitan Gravestones 原のキリシタン墓碑; Hara-no-kirishitan bohi	Taketa			33°04′23″N 131°21′27″E		
Onigajō Kofun 鬼ヶ城古墳; Onigajō kofun	Kusu			33°17′37″N 131°09′53″E		
Chidōkan 致道館; Chidōkan	Hiji			33°22′05″N 131°31′47″E		
Kunisaki Underground Burials 地下式土壙 chika shiki dokō	Kunisaki			33°29′25″N 131°36′13″E		
Kitsunezuka Kofun 狐塚古墳; Kitsunezuka kofun	Kunisaki			33°35′44″N 131°42′59″E		
Narazōshi Kofun 七双子古墳; Narazōshi kofun	Kitsuki			33°25′21″N 131°35′14″E		
Tsukayama Kofun 塚山古墳; Tsukayama kofun	Kunisaki			33°27′14″N 131°43′14″E		
Onizuka Kofun 鬼塚古墳; Onizuka kofun	Kusu			33°16′23″N 131°07′23″E		
Saiki Rock-cut Stone Tō 磨崖石塔 magai sekitō	Saiki			32°58′00″N 131°50′14″E		
Bungotakada Incised Stelai 線彫板碑 senbori itabi	Bungotakada			33°37′10″N 131°32′51″E		
Kakidaki Kirishitan Graves 掻懐キリシタン墓; Kakidaki Kirishitan no haka	Usuki			33°05′41″N 131°44′59″E		
Ushidono Kofun 丑殿古墳; Ushidono kofun	Ōita			33°13′02″N 131°34′04″E		
Kokuzō-ji Pagoda Site 虚空蔵寺塔跡; Kokuzōji tō ato	Usa			33°30′22″N 131°19′27″E		
Ueno Shell Mound 植野貝塚; Ueno kaizuka	Nakatsu			33°33′15″N 131°16′16″E		
Naramoto Rock Buddhas 楢本磨崖仏; Naramoto magaibutsu	Usa			33°25′04″N 131°23′21″E		
Fukō-ji Rock Buddhas 普光寺磨崖仏; Fukōji magaibutsu	Bungo-ōno			32°59′05″N 131°25′49″E		
Sendo Stone Buddhas 千燈石仏; Sendo sekibutsu	Kunisaki			33°37′22″N 131°35′12″E		
Waki Ranshitsu Grave 脇蘭室墓; Waki Ranshitsu haka	Ōita			33°14′24″N 131°41′28″E		
Hoashi Banri Grave 帆足万里墓; Hoashi Banri haka	Hiji			33°22′21″N 131°31′30″E		
Kirishitan Cave Chapel キリシタン洞窟礼拝堂; Kirishitan dōkutsu raihaidō	Taketa			32°57′57″N 131°23′38″E		
Shiragata Site 白潟遺跡; Shiragata iseki	Saiki			32°57′44″N 131°53′14″E		
Hamasaki Sogata Gorintō 浜崎祖形五輪塔群; Hamasaki sogata gorintō-gun	Kunisaki			33°36′08″N 131°41′23″E		
Shigeoka Kirishitan Grave 重岡キリシタン墓; Shigeoka kirishitan haka	Saiki			32°50′10″N 131°40′11″E		
Nagayu Incised Rock Buddhas 長湯線彫磨崖仏; Nagayu senbori magaibutsu	Taketa			33°05′28″N 131°23′39″E		
Kusunoki Living Rock Five-Storey Pagoda 楠木生石造五重塔; Kusunoki namasekizō gojūnotō	Ōita			33°09′34″N 131°39′52″E		
Fukushin Rock Buddhas - Dōnosako Rock Buddhas 福真磨崖仏付堂ノ迫磨崖仏; Fukushin magaibutsu tsuketari Dōnosako magaibutsu	Bungotakada			33°35′03″N 131°32′03″E		
Taketa Tsumotomiya Site - Kiko Stones 竹田津元宮遺跡付鬼籠列石; Taketa Tsumotomiya iseki tsuketari Kiko resseki	Kunisaki			33°39′09″N 131°33′47″E		
Yufuin Kirishitan Graves 由布院キリシタン墓群; Yufuin kirishitan haka-gun	Yufu			33°16′27″N 131°21′32″E		
Funai Castle Site 府内城跡; Funai-jō ato	Ōita			33°14′26″N 131°36′41″E		
Usuki Castle Site 臼杵城跡; Usuki-jō ato	Usuki			33°07′17″N 131°48′15″E		
Magari Stone Buddhas and Gorintō 曲石仏付双塔（五輪塔）磨崖連碑; Magari sekibutsu tsuketari sōtō (gorintō) magai renhi	Ōita			33°07′17″N 131°48′15″E		
Kugiono Mandala Stones 久木小野マンダラ石; Kugiono mandara ishi	Usuki			33°07′28″N 131°43′56″E		
Futago-ji 足曳山両子寺; Ashihikiyama Futagoji	Kunisaki			33°34′26″N 131°36′12″E		
Bungo-ōno Gorintō 五輪塔群 gorintō-gun	Bungo-ōno			33°03′11″N 131°37′55″E		
Kuchido Rock Buddhas and Gorintō 口戸磨崖仏付磨崖五輪双塔; Kuchido magaibutsu tsuketari magai gorinsōtō	Ōita			33°10′28″N 131°33′44″E		
Mōri Kūsō Former Residence 毛利空桑旧宅及び塾跡; Mōri Kūsō kyū-taku oyobi juku ato	Ōita			33°14′13″N 131°41′33″E		
Zaizen Family Graves 財前家墓地; Zaizen-ke bochi	Kitsuki			33°32′54″N 131°34′33″E		
Tahara Family Graves 田原家墓地; Tahara-ke bochi	Kitsuki			33°30′36″N 131°33′35″E		
Iwaya-ji Stone Buddhas 岩屋寺石仏; Iwaya-ji sekibutsu	Ōita			33°13′10″N 131°36′53″E		
Anase Cave Tomb Cluster 穴瀬横穴群; Anase yokoana-gun	Bungotakada			33°33′25″N 131°28′16″E		
Kyōshuzuka Kofun 凶首塚古墳; Kyōshuzuka kofun	Usa			33°31′40″N 131°21′52″E		
Ebisugahara Kofun 蛭子ヶ原古墳; Ebisugahara kofun	Usa			33°31′16″N 131°20′36″E		
Takakura Kofun 高倉古墳; Takakura kofun	Usa			33°34′19″N 131°22′50″E		
Hisabisauba Kofun 久々姥古墳; Hisabisauba kofun	Usa			33°32′17″N 131°18′07″E		
Kifunehirashita Urayama Cave Tomb Cluster 貴船平下の裏山横穴群; Kifunehirashita no Urayama yokoana-gun	Usa			33°31′50″N 131°17′42″E		
Yufu Hōtō and Gorintō 宝塔及び五輪塔群 hōtō oyobi gorintō-gun	Yufu			33°10′07″N 131°27′35″E		
Hasama Family Gorintō 挾間氏五輪塔群; Hasama-shi gorintō-gun	Yufu			33°12′01″N 131°30′53″E		
Sankin-kōtai Road 参勤交代道路 sankin-kōtai dōro	Ōita			33°06′49″N 131°27′04″E		
Michinoue Kofun 道ノ上古墳; Michinoue kofun	Bungo-ōno			32°58′57″N 131°35′56″E		
Ōtsuka Kofun 大塚古墳; Ōtsuka kofun	Bungo-ōno			32°59′05″N 131°36′39″E		
Sendō-ji Site 千燈寺跡; Sendōji ato	Kunisaki			33°38′13″N 131°35′22″E		
Shigemasa Kofun 重政古墳; Shigemasa kofun	Bungo-ōno			32°58′43″N 131°35′18″E		
Nyūzubaru Maruyama Kofun 入津原丸山古墳; Nyūzubaru Maruyama kofun	Bungotakada			33°34′35″N 131°26′58″E		
Nekoishi Maruyama Kofun 猫石丸山古墳; Nekoishi Maruyama kofun	Bungotakada			33°35′23″N 131°27′25″E		
Kyōtoku Site 京徳遺跡; Kyōtoku iseki	Usa			33°33′38″N 131°17′14″E		
Koinari Kofun 古稲荷古墳; Koinari kofun	Usa			33°31′19″N 131°21′00″E		
Noshika Cave 野鹿洞穴; Noshika horaana	Taketa			32°56′18″N 131°14′48″E		
Kamado Family Graves Old Tō 竈門氏墓地古塔群; Kamado-shi bochi kotō-gun	Beppu			33°19′24″N 131°29′04″E		
Kawahara Tunnel and Cobblestones 川原隧道と石畳; Kawahara zuidō to ishidatami	Hita			33°17′30″N 130°59′05″E		
Bōnoharu Kofun 坊ノ原古墳; Bōnoharu kofun	Bungo-ōno			33°01′52″N 131°28′29″E		
Misumi Pond and Komo Jinja 三角池と薦神社; Misumi-ike to Komo Jinja	Nakatsu			33°34′01″N 131°13′05″E		
Tennen-ji 長岩屋山天念寺; Nagaiwayasan Tennenji	Bungotakada			33°34′43″N 131°32′28″E		
Chōan-ji 金剛山長安寺; Kongōzan Chōanji	Bungotakada			33°34′04″N 131°32′55″E		
Iwatō-ji 石立山岩戸寺; Ishidatesan Iwatōji	Kunisaki			33°37′09″N 131°37′08″E		
Monjusen-ji 峨眉山文殊仙寺; Gabisan Monjusenji	Kunisaki			33°36′09″N 131°36′50″E		
Shimoichi Rock Buddhas 下市磨崖仏; Shimoichi magaibutsu	Usa			33°26′34″N 131°21′01″E		
Uehara Site 上原遺跡; Uehara iseki	Usa			33°31′22″N 131°21′05″E		
Hijiridō Site 樋尻道遺跡; Hijiridō iseki	Usa			33°31′57″N 131°21′34″E		
Noguchi Site 野口遺跡; Noguchi iseki	Usa			33°32′04″N 131°21′39″E		
Hōraisan Kofun 蓬来山古墳; Hōraisan kofun	Ōita			33°13′13″N 131°34′10″E		
Bōgaki Site 棒垣遺跡; Bōgaki iseki	Nakatsu			33°33′50″N 131°13′24″E		
Mitsuoka Castle Site 光岡城跡; Mitsuoka-jō ato	Usa			33°31′20″N 131°16′31″E		
Kōberamabu Site 川平間歩の跡; Kōberamabu no ato	Nakatsu	late C17 irrigation tunnel		33°31′04″N 131°10′09″E		
Matama Family Fortified Residence Site 真玉氏居館跡; Matama-shi kyokan ato	Bungotakada			33°36′03″N 131°28′36″E		
Ishizaka Cobbled Road 石坂石畳道; Ishizaka ishidatami michi	Hita			33°22′09″N 130°58′38″E		
Mōri Kūsō Grave 毛利空桑墓; Mōri Kūsō haka	Ōita			33°12′52″N 131°41′10″E		
Shiroyama Kofun 城山古墳; Shiroyama kofun	Hita			33°19′54″N 130°58′52″E		
Hegi Cave 枌洞穴; Hegi horaana	Nakatsu			33°29′26″N 131°12′08″E		
Yakushidōyama Kofun 薬師堂山古墳; Yakushidōyama kofun	Hita			33°19′11″N 130°56′49″E		
Otōyama Kofun 御塔山古墳; Otōyama kofun	Kitsuki			33°24′44″N 131°42′01″E		
Tateno Kofun 立野古墳; Tateno kofun	Bungo-ōno			33°00′24″N 131°35′20″E		
Kokuzō-ji No.1 Tile Kiln Site 虚空蔵寺１号瓦窯跡; Kokuzōji ichi-gō kawara gama ato	Usa			33°30′22″N 131°19′27″E		
Akiba Onizuka Kofun 秋葉鬼塚古墳; Akiba Onizuka kofun	Bungo-ōno			32°58′08″N 131°34′46″E		
Kiriyose Tile Kiln Site 切寄瓦窯跡; Kiriyose kawara gama ato	Usa			33°30′22″N 131°19′27″E		
Kawaragama Site カワラガマ遺跡; Kawaragama iseki	Bungotakada			33°32′14″N 131°28′39″E		
Fukiage Site 吹上遺跡; Fukiage iseki	Hita			33°20′06″N 130°54′53″E		
Kōmori Falls Boat Route 蝙蝠滝舟路跡; Kōmori-taki shūrushi	Bungo-ōno			32°58′39″N 131°25′30″E		
Gekkei-ji Precinct 月桂寺境内; Gekkeiji keidai	Usuki			33°07′06″N 131°48′05″E		
Saikō-ji Precinct 西光寺境内; Saikōji keidai	Taketa			32°58′19″N 131°23′33″E		
Ryūgahana Kofun 竜ヶ鼻古墳; Ryūgahana kofun	Bungo-ōno			32°59′06″N 131°35′12″E		
Senpuku-ji Precinct 泉福寺境内; Senpukuji keidai	Kunisaki			33°34′39″N 131°40′15″E		
Asahi Tenjinyama Kofun 朝日天神山古墳; Asahi Tenjinyama kofun	Hita			33°20′32″N 130°54′53″E		
Myōraku-ji Sutra Mound 妙楽寺経塚; Myōrakuji kyōzuka	Usuki			33°30′08″N 131°17′49″E		
Nakatsu Castle Enclosure Mound 中津城おかこい山; Nakatsu-jō okakoiyama	Nakatsu			33°36′24″N 131°11′11″E		
Aihara Yamakubi Site 相原山首遺跡; Aihara Yamakubi iseki	Nakatsu			33°34′00″N 131°11′41″E		
Nagaiwa Castle Site 長岩城跡; Nagaiwa-jō ato	Nakatsu			33°29′41″N 131°02′44″E		
Komakiyama Kofun Cluster 小牧山古墳群; Komakiyama kofun-gun	Ōita			33°10′23″N 131°39′05″E		
Inōe Mondozaemon Graves 井上主水左衛門並古・並増墓所; Inōe Mondozaemon Namifuru・Namimasu bosho	Bungo-ōno			33°00′21″N 131°25′51″E		
Aihara Haiji Site 相原廃寺跡付塔心礎; Aihara Haiji ato tsuketari tō shinso	Nakatsu			33°34′16″N 131°11′24″E		
Nakatsu Castle Site 中津城跡; Nakatsu-jō ato	Nakatsu			33°36′24″N 131°11′11″E		
Rokugō-san Ebisu Iwaya Precinct 六郷山夷岩屋の寺社境内; Rokugō-san Ebisu Iwaya no jisha keidai	Bungotakada			33°36′55″N 131°33′35″E		
Nagayama Castle Site 永山城跡; Nagayama-jō ato	Hita			33°19′56″N 130°56′11″E		
Hirata Castle Site 平田城跡; Hirata-jō ato	Nakatsu			33°28′23″N 131°08′45″E		
Hōgaki Site 法垣遺跡; Hōgaki iseki	Nakatsu			33°33′03″N 131°12′48″E		

== Municipal Historic Sites ==
As of 1 May 2024, a further three hundred and thirty Sites have been designated as being of municipal importance.

== See also ==
- Cultural Properties of Japan
- Bungo Province
- Buzen Province
- Ōita Prefectural Museum of History
- List of Places of Scenic Beauty of Japan (Ōita)
- List of Cultural Properties of Japan - paintings (Ōita)
