= Kuzuhara Kofun =

Burial mound in Kyushu, Japan

- 葛原古墳 (Japanese)
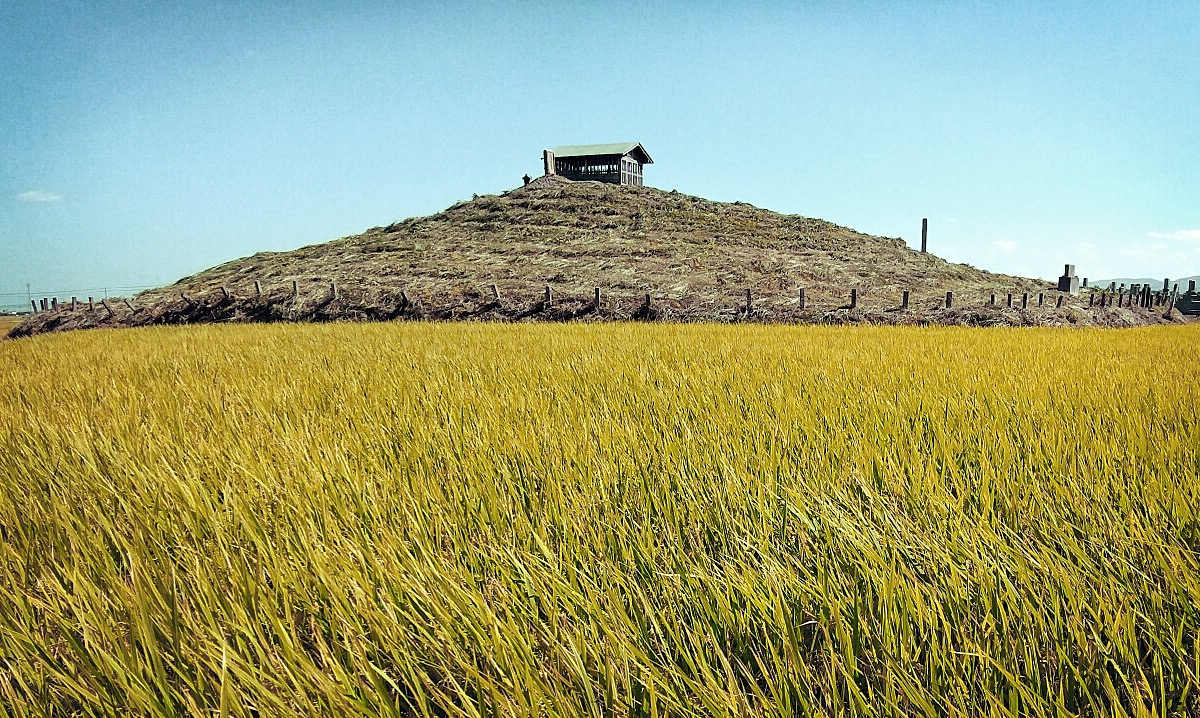
- Kuzuhara Kofun

- Kuzuhara Kofun Kuzuhara Kofun (Japan)
- Interactive map of Kuzuhara Kofun
- 33°32′26.2″N 131°20′10″E
- Type: Kofun
- Periods: Kofun period
- Location: Usa, Ōita, Japan
- Region: Kyushu

History
- Built: c.5th century

Site notes
- Public access: Yes (no facilities)

Kuzuhara Kofun (葛原古墳) is a Kofun period burial mound, located in the Onizuka, Kuzuhara neighborhood of the city of Usa on the island of Kyushu, Japan. The tumulus was designated a National Historic Site of Japan in 1957.

== Overview ==
The Kuzuhara Kofun is located in a wide open rice field on a low plateau on the left bank of the Yakan River, and was once called the Onizuka Tumulus. It is a large enpun (円墳)-style kofun, with a diameter of 53 meters and height of 6 meters built in two stages. However, there is also a theory that it was originally a zenpō-kōen-fun (前方後円墳), which is shaped like a keyhole, having one square end and one circular end, when viewed from above, which has lost its anterior portion. It is estimated to have been constructed from the mid to late 5th century. The top of the tumulus is a flat surface with a diameter of 10 meters, with the stone burial chamber exposed almost in the center. This was discovered by villagers in 1889 when they were clearing the top of the tumulus. The burial chamber has its main axis running north–south, and measures 2.5 meters long, 1.3 meters wide, and 1.2 meters deep. Grave goods included bronze mirrors, magatama, ironware, and armor, but the armor is particularly noteworthy, and includes a triangular plate leather-bound cuirass and a helmet, which is also accompanied by a neck armor. These are typical 5th century burial mound grave goods, but as they are different from that found in the nearby Kawabe-Takamori Kofun cluster, which was constructed from the end of the 3rd century to the middle of the 6th century, it is assumed that this tumulus was built a new ruling clan, possibly from the Kinai region.

The tumulus is approximately five minutes by car from Yanagigaura Station on the JR Kyushu Nippō Main Line.

== See also ==
- List of Historic Sites of Japan (Ōita)
