= Hōonjiyama Kofun Cluster =

- 法恩寺山古墳群 (Japanese)
- Hōonjiyama Kofun Cluster Hōonjiyama Kofun Cluster (Japan)
- Interactive map of Hōonjiyama Kofun Cluster
- 33°18′36.6″N 130°57′0.8″E
- Type: Kofun
- Periods: Kofun period
- Location: Hita, Ōita, Japan
- Region: Kyushu

History
- Built: c.6th century

Site notes
- Public access: Yes (no facilities)

The Hōonjiyama Kofun Cluster (法恩寺山古墳群, Hōonjiyama Kofun gun) is a group of Kofun period burial mounds, located in the Yukiimachi neighborhood of the city of Hita, Ōita Prefecture on the island of Kyushu, Japan. Two of the surviving tumuli were designated a National Historic Site of Japan in 1959.

== Overview ==
The Hōonjiyama Kofun Cluster is located on a hill in the eastern part of the Hita Basin, and the Mikuma River (upper part of the Chikugo River) flows to the south. The cluster consists of seven enpun (円墳)-style round tumuli, and all but Kofun No.4 have been damaged due to land clearance and grave theft. Per the Bungo no Kuni Fudoki, during the reign of Emperor Kinmei, the ancestor of the Kusakabe clan settled in this area of Hita, and it is presumed that these burial mounds are the tombs of the chieftains of that clan. As the surviving tumuli are decorated kofun, they share common characteristics of the culture area of the Chikugo River basin, along with the nearby Garandoya Kofun and Anakannon Kofun.

Hōonjiyama Kofun No3 Although a considerable amount of the mound of Kofun No.3 has been lost, it is estimated that it had a diameter of approximately 20 meters and a height of 4 meters. The stone burial chamber is a horizontal-type stone passage with a multi-chamber structure at the end. The rear chamber is 2.4 meters deep, 2.3 meters wide, and 2.3 meters high, and the front chamber is 1.9 meters deep, 2.5 meters wide, and 1.9 meters high. The walls are made of flat split stones that are stacked flat and gradually push toward the ceiling, and this type of structure is unique in Oita Prefecture. The decoration is a colored mural, and in the back chamber, there is one circular pattern on the back wall, a circular pattern on the right wall, and nine concentric circular patterns. In the front room, a horse and a person are depicted on the left side, and a horseman is depicted on the right side, and concentric circles and birds are drawn on the stone that spans between the side stones. Also, on the inner left side of the sleeve stone leading from the path to the front room, a four-legged beast and a circle are depicted. The geometric pattern on the back chamber contrasts with the human and horse designs on the front chamber. Among the grave goods excavated were amber balls, horse fittings, and Sue ware pottery. From these items it is estimated that the kofun was constructed in the latter half of the 6th century.

Hōonjiyama Kofun No.4 Kofun No. 4 has a diameter of approximately 13 meters and a height of approximately 3.5 meters. The stone chamber is a horizontal cave-style stone chamber, and the burial chamber is 2.6 meters deep and 2 meters wide, gradually narrowing to 1.5 meters on the side of the path. The walls are made of flat stones stacked together like in Tomb No. 3, gradually rising toward the ceiling. A total of three human remains, that of two adults and one child, were found inside the burial chamber. The grave goods include a deformed bronze mirror of depicting five beasts, a straight iron sword, an iron arrowhead, a trumpet, a bell, a magatama, and Sue ware pottery. It is estimated that this tumulus was constructed in the first half of the 6th century.

The site is approximately a ten-minute walk from Bungo-Miyoshi Station on the JR Kyushu Kyūdai Main Line.

== See also ==
- List of Historic Sites of Japan (Ōita)

Decorated kofun
