= Sato Kanga ruins =

Archaeological site in Japan

- 里官衙遺跡 (Japanese)
- Sato Kanga ruins Sato Kanga ruins (Japan)
- Interactive map of Sato Kanga ruins
- 33°24′57″N 131°37′36″E
- Type: Kanga ruins
- Periods: Nara period
- Location: Ōita, Ōita, Japan
- Region: Kyushu

Site notes
- Public access: Yes (no facilities)

Sato Kanga ruins (里官衙遺跡, Sato kanga iseki) is an archaeological site with the ruins of a Nara to Heian period government administrative complex located in what is now the Kaneda and Higashioka neighborhoods of the city of Ōita, on the island of Kyushu Japan. The ruins were designated a National Historic Site of Japan in 2022.

== Overview ==
In the late Nara period, after the establishment of a centralized government under the Ritsuryō system, local rule over the provinces was standardized under a kokufu (provincial capital), and each province was divided into smaller administrative districts, known as (郡, gun, kōri), composed of 2–20 townships in 715 AD. Each of the units had an administrative complex, or kanga (官衙遺跡) built on a semi-standardized layout based on contemporary Chinese design.

The Sato Kanga Ruins are located on the Johara Plateau at an elevation of 42 meters between the Ōno River and Nyu River in the eastern part of Ōita City. Excavations have uncovered the remains of dug-up pillar buildings and pit dwellings dating from the mid-7th century to the early 8th century. Among them, from the end of the 7th century to the beginning of the 8th century, multiple large dug-out pillared buildings were arranged in a " U-shape" with the main building in the center. This corresponds to the standardized layout of a kanga government office complete. It is believed that this was the administrative center of ancient Amabe District. These buildings were abolished in the first half of the 8th century, and the function of government offices was gradually transferred to the west in the Nara period.

== See also ==
- List of Historic Sites of Japan (Ōita)
