= Yokkaichi Cave Tomb Cluster =

Artificial caves in Usa, Japan

- 四日市横穴群 (Japanese)
- Yokkaichi Cave Tomb Cluster Yokkaichi Cave Tomb Cluster (Japan)
- Interactive map of Yokkaichi Cave Tomb Cluster
- 33°31′37″N 131°10′20″E
- Type: necropolis
- Periods: Kofun period
- Location: Usa, Ōita, Japan
- Region: Kyushu

History
- Built: 6th-7th century CE

Site notes
- Owner: Public
- Public access: Yes

The Yokkaichi Cave Tomb Cluster (四日市横穴群, Yokkaichi yokoana-gun) is the collective name for two clusters of yokoanabo tombs dug in artificial caves in tuff cliffs in the Yokkaichi neighborhood of the city of Usa, Ōita Prefecture, Japan. It was designated as a National Historic Site in 1957.

== Overview ==
In the latter half of the Kofun period, the class of people buried expanded, and mass cemeteries in which a side hole is dug into the slope of a hill to provide a burial chamber, began to replace burial mounds. Such cemeteries could contain dozens to hundreds of tombs, with each tomb containing multiple burials.

The Yokkaichi Cave Tomb Cluster consist of 161 horizontal cave tombs built into the tuff bedrock on the east slope of the Dainohara Hills. The necropolis extends for approximately 300 meters, These are divided into the Kagayama Cluster (加賀山支群), which has 75 cave tombs spread over an area of about 160 meters from north-to-south, arranged in six steps on a slope with an altitude of 28 to 40 meters, arranged in a staircase pattern, and the Ikkite cluster (一鬼手支群), with 86 cave tombs built on a slope of 28 to 36 meters above sea level, on a 3- to 4-tiered surface. Each of the cave tombs is oval in plan, with a semicylindrical burial chamber with a short passageway, with the ceiling gradually lowering towards the back. Many of the tombs have been open since antiquity, and since no systematic archaeological excavation has ever been performed, details of the burials and grave goods are unknown. Some of the tombs are decorated with colored patterns, notably as Kagayama No.39, and No.40, and Ikkite No.62. The Kagayama decorations include four images of people standing with their hands outstretched, as well as concentric circles, in red with a black border. Ikkite No.62 has14 large and small red concentric circles.

It is estimated that these tombs was built between the late 6th century and the 7th century.

== See also ==
- List of Historic Sites of Japan (Ōita)
