= Shimoyama Kofun (Usuki) =

- 下山古墳 (Japanese)
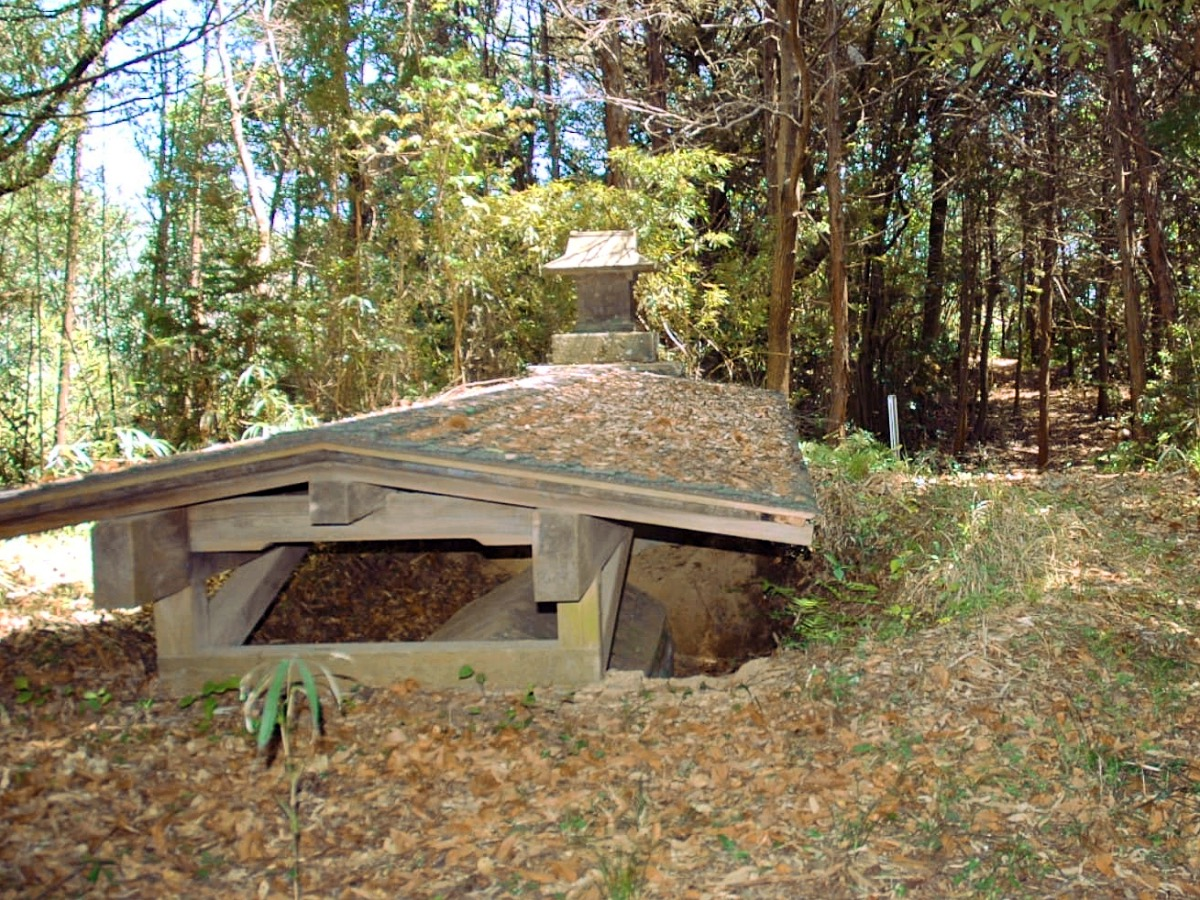
- Shimoyama Kofun

- Shimoyama Kofun Shimoyama Kofun (Usuki) (Japan)
- Interactive map of Shimoyama Kofun
- 33°07′57.6″N 131°47′33″E
- Type: Kofun
- Periods: Kofun period
- Location: Usuki, Ōita, Japan
- Region: Kyushu

History
- Built: c.5th century

Site notes
- Public access: Yes (no facilities)

Shimoyama Kofun (下山古墳) is a Kofun period keyhole-shaped burial mound, located in the Shibao neighborhood of the city of Usuki, Ōita, on the island of Kyushu Japan. The tumulus was designated a National Historic Site of Japan in 1957.

== Overview ==
The Shimoyama Kofun is a zenpō-kōen-fun (前方後円墳), which is shaped like a keyhole, having one square end and one circular end, when viewed from above. It is located on a hill at an elevation of approximately 70 meters overlooking the Kumazaki River. Its total length is 68 meters, with a posterior circular portion 46-meters in diameter, and a rectangular anterior portion 37 meters wide. Traces of a partial moat encircle the posterior portion and there is a baizuka ancillary tumulus. Near the boundary between the anterior and posterior portions, is a heavily damaged stone statue depicting warrior in armor. There are only two kofun in Ōita Prefecture that have such a statue: Shimoyama Kofun, and Usuzuka Kofun, also located in Usuki. In the posterior circular portion is a house-shaped sarcophagus measuring 2.5 meters long, 1.3 meters wide, and 1 meter high, the lid of which has a band pattern embossed on it. When excavated in 1951, the remains of two bodies, one male and one female, were found within the coffin, and the grave goods included a divine beast bronze mirror, a shell ring, cylindrical beads, a comb, an iron sword and iron arrowheads, an iron ax, etc. A large amount of iron material, believed to be unprocessed iron, was found outside the coffin. From these grave goods it is estimated that it was built in the middle of the 5th century.

Currently, a shelter has been placed over the sarcophagus to permit public viewing. The tumulus is approximately a 15-minute walk from Kumasaki Station on the JR Kyushu Nippō Main Line.

== See also ==
- List of Historic Sites of Japan (Ōita)
