= Chiyomaru Kofun =

Burial mound in Ōita, Kyushu, Japan

- 千代丸古墳 (Japanese)
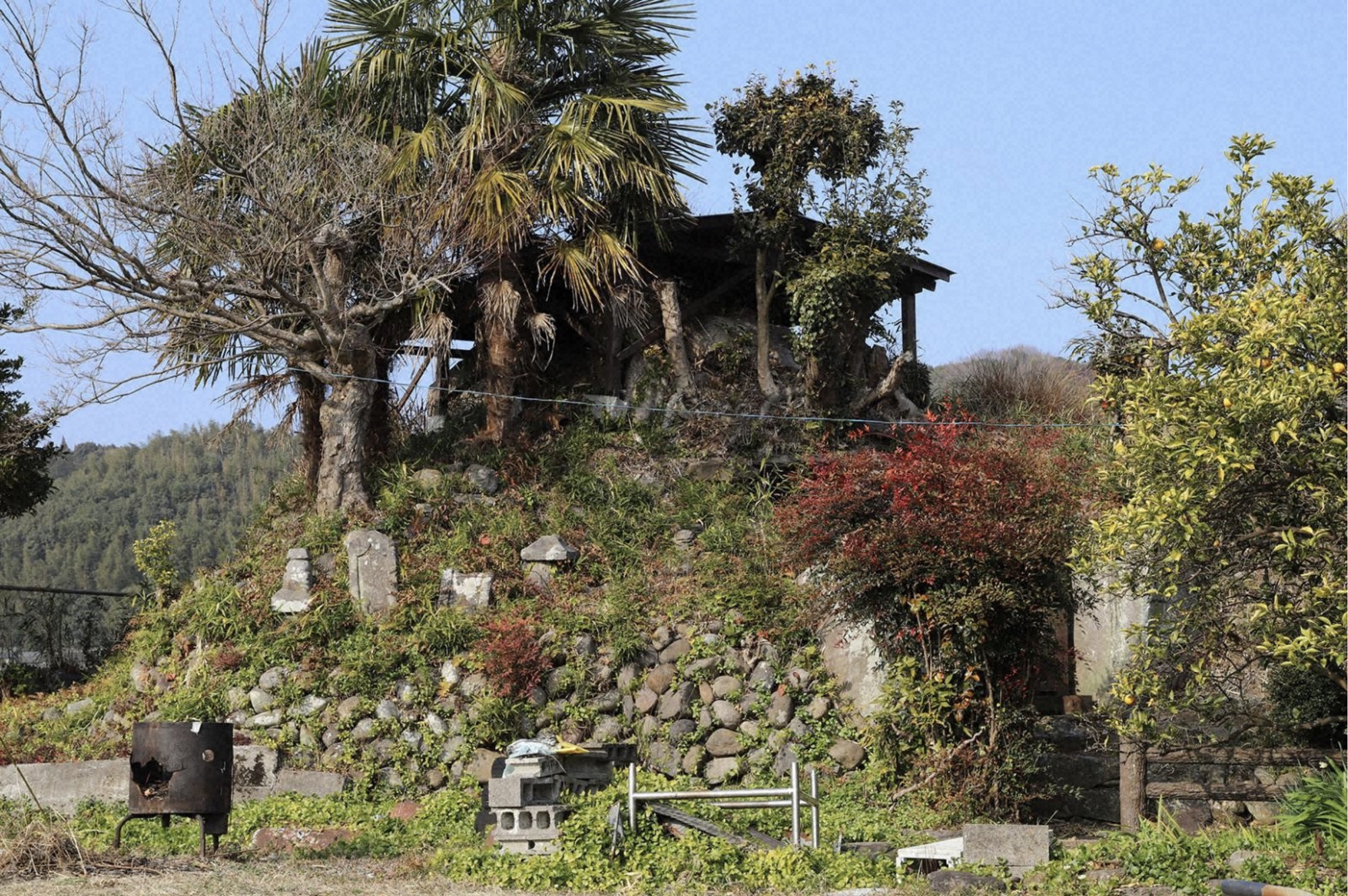
- Chiyomaru Kofun

- Chiyomaru Kofun Chiyomaru Kofun (Japan)
- 33°13′13.0″N 131°32′35.6″E
- Type: Kofun
- Periods: Kofun period
- Location: Ōita, Ōita, Japan
- Region: Kyushu

History
- Built: c.7th century

Site notes
- Public access: Yes (no facilities)
- National Historic Site of Japan

The Chiyomaru Kofun (千代丸古墳) is a Kofun period burial mound, located in the Miyaen neighborhood of the city of Ōita on the island of Kyushu, Japan. The tumulus was designated a National Historic Site of Japan in 1934.

== Overview ==
The Chiyomaru Kofun is located on a fluvial terrace approximately two kilometers west of the confluence of the Ōita River and its tributary, the Kaku River. It is an enpun (円墳)-style round tumulus with a diameter of approximately 15 meters and a height of approximately four meters. It is estimated that it was built around the beginning of the 7th century. The single horizontal cave-style stone burial chamber made of huge tuff stones opens to the south, with a total length of 8.9 meters. The burial chamber proper measures 3.6 by two meters, with a height of 2.6 meters. Some traces of vermillion paint remain. The passage is 4.8 meters long and 1.9 meters wide. Both the burial chamber and the corridor have a 1.2 meter-high hip stone placed at the bottom of the side wall, and on the back wall, a 50 cm-thick stone shelf protrudes horizontally about one meter above the platform which held the body. This tomb feature is found in Kyushu from southern Fukuoka Prefecture to northern Kumamoto Prefecture. The front surface of the stone trellis is carved into a flat surface, with line engravings of triangles, people, and animals.

The tumulus is about a ten-minute walk from Kaku Station on the JR Kyushu Kyūdai Main Line.

== See also ==
- List of Historic Sites of Japan (Ōita)

Decorated kofun
