= Shimofuji Kirishitan cemetery =

Cemetery in Ōita, Japan

- 下山古墳 (Japanese)
- Shimofuji Kirishitan cemetery Shimofuji Kirishitan cemetery (Japan)
- Interactive map of Shimofuji Kirishitan cemetery
- 33°03′02″N 131°49′59″E
- Type: cemetery
- Periods: Sengoku-Edo period
- Location: Usuki, Ōita, Japan
- Region: Kyushu

History
- Built: c.16th-17th century

Site notes
- Public access: Yes (no facilities)

Shimofuji Kirishitan cemetery (下藤キリシタン墓地, Shimofuji kirishitan bochi) is a cemetery located in the Nozu neighborhood of the city of Usuki, Ōita, on the island of Kyushu Japan. The tumulus was designated a National Historic Site of Japan in 2018.

== Overview ==
Shimofuji Kirishitan cemetery was established between the end of the Sengoku period and the early Edo period to bury the many Kirishitan who lived in Geto Village at the time. It is located on a ridge on the left bank of the Nozu River, a tributary of the Ōno River. An archaeological excavation conducted by the Usuki City Board of Education revealed 66 graves, the foundation of small stone buildings, and remnants of a road in an area measuring 35 meters from north-to-south and 18 meters from east-to-west. Some graves were made of unprocessed stones, while others are made of recycled materials from medieval stone structures. Iron nails and a skull were found inside one grave, indicating that the grave had contained a rectangular wooden coffin. Around the time that Ōtomo Yoshishige converted to Christianity in 1578, Jesuits began missionary work in Nozu, Bungo Province, and thousands of Christians were baptised. It is recorded that on Luís Fróis' Historia de Iapam, that a church was built in this location around 1579 and a Christian cemetery on the mountain above it.

One of the tombstones is inscribed with a Greek cross and the name "Jonchin". This is possibly the grave of "Jochin", a Kirishitan and swordsmith from Yufuin mentioned in Luís Fróis' account. Per Luís Fróis, after the foreign missionaries were expelled from Japan in 1587 by Toyotomi Hideyoshi, Ōtomo Yoshishige's son Ōtomo Yoshimune recanted his faith and began to persecute the Kirishitan. Jochin continued missionary activities in secret and to make new coverts until he was discovered and executed as one of the first martyrs in Bungo.

== See also ==
- List of Historic Sites of Japan (Ōita)
