= Hōkyō-ji temple ruins =

Asuka period temple ruins in Usa, Ōita, Japan

- 法鏡寺廃寺跡 (Japanese)
- Hōkyō-ji temple ruins Hōkyō-ji temple ruins (Japan)
- Interactive map of Hōkyō-ji temple ruins
- 33°31′43.0″N 131°20′43.0″E
- Type: temple ruin
- Periods: Asuka period
- Location: Usa, Ōita, Japan
- Region: Kyushu

History
- Built: c.7th century

Site notes
- Public access: Yes (no facilities)

The Hōkyō-ji temple ruins (法鏡寺廃寺跡, Hōkyōji haiji ato) is an archaeological site with the ruins of an Asuka period Buddhist temple in what is now the city of Usa, Ōita, in Kyushu, Japan. It was designated as a National Historic Site in 1978.

== History ==
Hōkyō-ji temple ruins are located at the western base of the Kunisaki Peninsula, on the natural embankment on the left bank of the Yakan River, which flows into the Suō Sea. This temple was founded in the late Asuka period (Hakuhō period) as one of the first national temples established in 680. During the Nara period, the Usa region was a center of religion, and numerous temples were constructed. With the exception of Miroku-ji, which was built as a shrine temple for Usa Jingū, these temples are presumed to have been built by powerful families in the Usa region. Because of its location, Hōkyō-ji is thought that it was built by the Karashima clan. The temple once disappeared in the middle of the Heian period, and was later rebuilt in the same area by the Nanboku-chō period, but it was abandoned due to the Haibutsu kishaku movement after the Meiji Restoration.

The remains of the central gate, main hall, and auditorium have been discovered so far, from which it can be determined that the layout was patterned after Hōryū-ji in Ikaruga, Nara. Furthermore, since the excavated roof tiles are limited to the early Heian period, it is thought that the large-scale temple lasted for a relatively short period of time, until the early Heian period.

The base of the main hall measures 14.6 meters from east-to-west and 11 meters from north-to-south, and the base of the auditorium measures approximately 30 meters from east-to-west and 17 meters from north-to-south. The remains of the foundations for a pagoda have yet to be found. The overall temple area is believed to extend approximately 120 meters from east-to-west, and even more from north-to-south. Sancai and green glazed pottery were excavated from the north side of the auditorium, and these are luxury items made in a limited number of workshops, they suggest the high status of the temple.

The site is now a public park, and is located approximately three kilometers west of Usa Shrine.

== See also ==
- List of Historic Sites of Japan (Ōita)
