= Anakannon Kofun =

- 穴観音古墳 (Japanese)
- Location within Oita Prefecture Location within Japan
- 33°18′27.6″N 130°54′21.1″E
- Type: Kofun
- Periods: Kofun period
- Location: Hita, Ōita, Japan
- Region: Kyushu

History
- Built: c.6th-7th century

Site notes
- Public access: Yes (no facilities)
- National Historic Site of Japan

Anakannon Kofun (穴観音古墳) is a Kofun period Decorated kofun burial mound, located in the Kōno neighborhood of the city of Hita on the island of Kyushu, Japan. The tumulus was designated a National Historic Site of Japan in 1933.

== Overview ==
The Anakannon Kofun is located on a plateau on the left bank of the Mikuma River (the upstream portion of the Chikugo River) that flows through the Hita Basin, and is estimated to have been constructed between the end of the 6th century and the beginning of the 7th century AD. This area is home to a collection of ruins from the Japanese Paleolithic period to the Kofun period, and is also known as the "Chōjabaru Ruins". This tumulus is thought to belong to the decorative tumulus culture area of the Chikugo River basin, along with the Garandoya Kofun located about 700 meters to the north and the nearby Hōonjiyama Kofun Cluster.

The tumulus is a circular enpun (円墳)-style kofun, with a diameter of 10 meters and height of approximately two meters. The burial chamber is a horizontal cave-style stone-lined multi-chamber structure, opening to the south. The existing burial chamber has lost its entrance and has a total length of 7.2 meters. The rear chamber is 3 meters deep and 2.3 meters wide, and the front chamber is 2.6 meters deep and 2 meters wide. The decorations are painted in two colors: red and green, on the back and right walls of the rear chamber, and on the left and right side walls of the front chamber. Among these, the back wall of the rear chamber has geometric patterns of concentric circles and continuous triangular patterns, the right wall has circular patterns and birds, and the left and right side walls of the front chamber have concentric circles, boats, and both right and left hands. It depicts a person with his legs spread apart. The concentric circular pattern on the front chamber and the inner contour of the boat are concave, but this method is not common in this region, and may have been influenced by the tombs of the Higo region, which have many carved patterns.

In later generations, because a stone Kannon Bosatsu was placed in the back chamber, it came to be called "Anakannon". It is located approximately 15 minutes by car from Hita Station on the JR Kyushu Kyūdai Main Line.

== See also ==
- List of Historic Sites of Japan (Ōita)
