= Oni-no-iwa Kofun =

Pair of Japanese burial mounds

- 鬼ノ岩屋古墳 (Japanese)
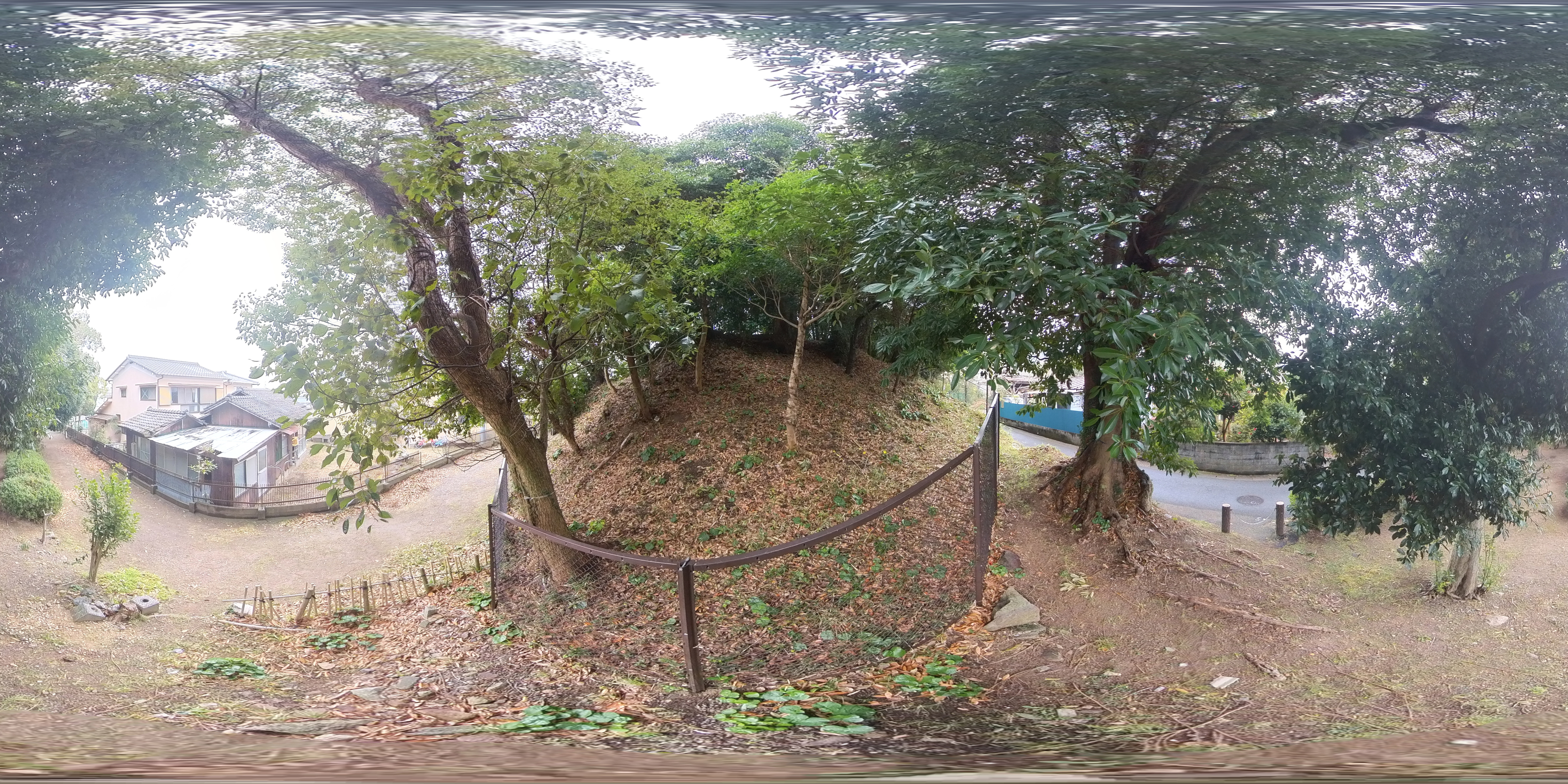

- Oni-no-iwa Kofun Oni-no-iwa Kofun (Japan)
- Interactive map of Oni-no-iwa Kofun
- 33°18′56″N 131°29′32″E
- Type: Kofun
- Periods: Kofun period
- Location: Beppu, Ōita, Japan
- Region: Kyushu

History
- Built: c.5th century

Site notes
- Public access: Yes (no facilities)

Oni-no-iwa Kofun (鬼ノ岩屋古墳) is a pair Kofun period burial mounds, located in the Shoninnakamachi neighborhood of the city of Beppu, Ōita, on the island of Kyushu Japan. The tumuli were designated a National Historic Site of Japan in 1957 with the area under protection extended in 2017.

== Overview ==
The Oni-no-Iwaya Kofun are located halfway up a wide alluvial fan facing Beppu Bay. Kofun No. 1 has a horizontal stone burial chamber with a vestibule and a house-shaped back chamber. Kofun No. 2 has a huge single burial chamber built by assembling andesite megaliths. Both are estimated to date from the late Kofun period. The external shape of Kofun No. 1 has been significantly deformed due to erosion, but it is estimated to have been 23 meters in diameter and approximately 5 meters in height. The entire interior of the burial chamber is painted red, and the front chamber has white sawtooth patterns, as well as yellow and black triangular patterns and bracken patterns. Kofun No. 2 is located about 100 meters away from Kofun No. 1, and is an enpun (円墳)-style circular mound with a diameter of about 30 meters and a height of about 6 meters. The burial chamber is 8 meters deep with a ceiling height of about 4 meters. The walls are made of stones piled up in an arch shape, and the entire interior of the burial chamber is painted red, with numerous circular and bracken patterns drawn in black. Decorated kofun of this style are extremely rare on the eastern Kyushu coast.

The site is approximately a ten-minute walk from Beppu Daigaku Station on the JR Kyushu Nippō Main Line.

== See also ==
- List of Historic Sites of Japan (Ōita)
- Decorated kofun
