= Takase Stone Buddhas =

- 高瀬石仏 (Japanese)
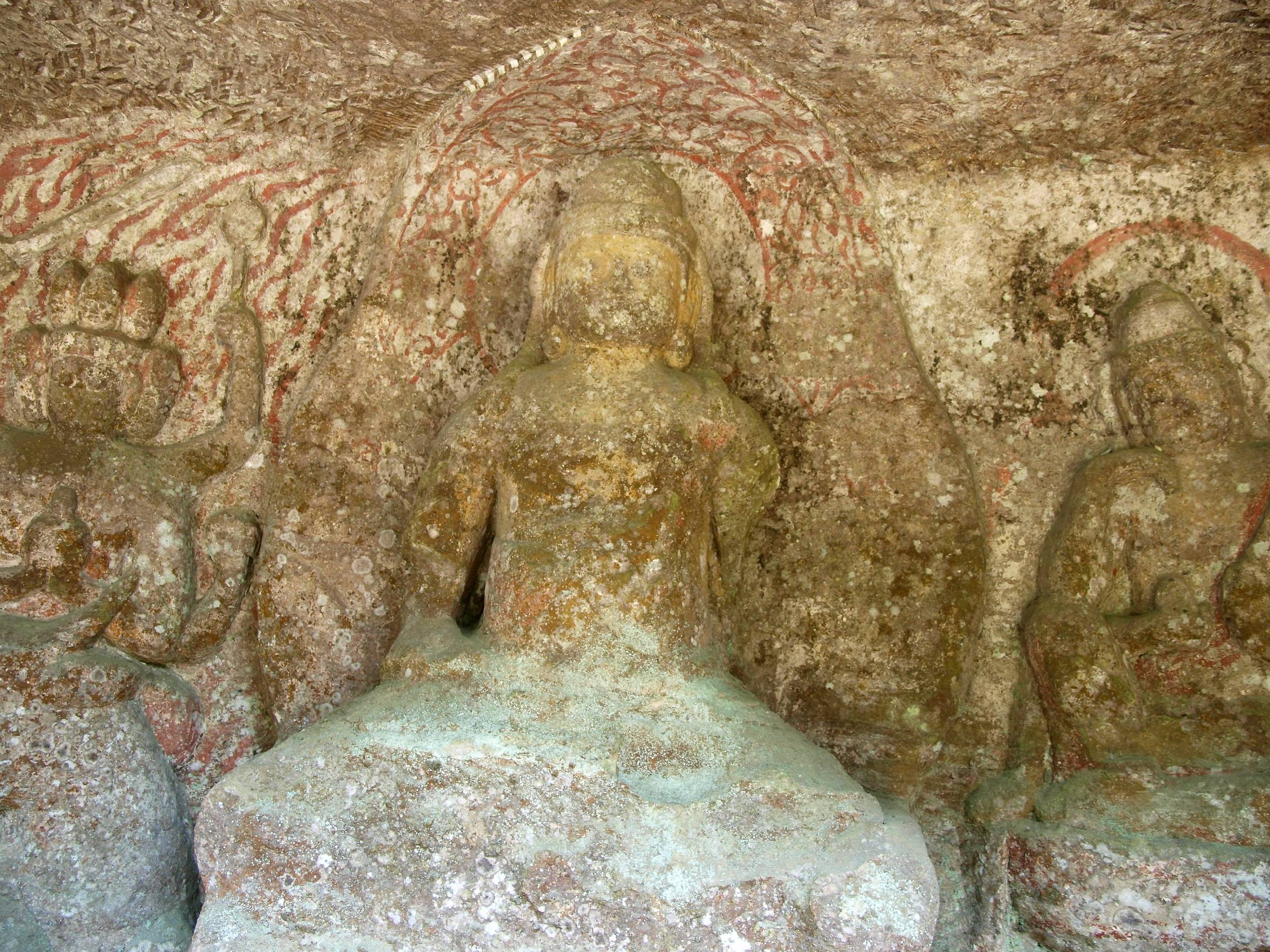
- Takase Stone Buddhas

- Takase Stone Buddhas Takase Stone Buddhas (Japan)
- Interactive map of Takase Stone Buddhas
- 33°10′48″N 131°34′34″E
- Periods: Heian period
- Location: Ōita (city), Ōita Prefecture, Japan
- Region: Kyushu

Site notes
- Public access: Yes

The Takase Stone Buddhas (高瀬石仏, Takase sekibutsu) is a group of religious statues carved in bas-relief into a tuff cliff in Takase neighborhood of the city of Ōita, Ōita Prefecture on the island of Kyushu, Japan. The site was designated a National Historic Site of Japan in 1934.

== Overview ==
Constructing Buddha statues out of stone is widely practiced in Buddhist areas in Asia. These images can be divided into three broad types: Magaibutsu (磨崖仏), bas-relief images carved directly into a cliff face, movable independent stone Buddhas carved from cut stone, and cave Buddhas carved inside rock caves, The Takase images can be classed as Magaibutsu.

The Takase images are located on a tuff cliff on the east side of a small hill that extends to the Nanase River, a tributary of the Ōita River, at the northern foot of Mount Ryōzan, a sacred mountain that rises to the southwest of the Ōita Plain at an elevation of 596 meters. Dating from the late Heian period (mid-12th century), the niche with carvings is approximately 1.8 meters high, 4.4 meters wide, and 1.5 meter deep. It contains five statues centered on the seated statue of Dainichi Nyōrai, which is missing the tips of both hands and elbows, seated on a rectangular pedestal. It is nearly carved in the round and retains some traces of coloring. Facing Dainichi Nyōrai, on the right are Nyōirin Kannon and Batō Kannon, and on the left are Daiitoku Myōō and Jinja Taishō. Outside the cave, in a small niche on the cliff to the right, there remains an embossed image of the Amida Triad on a lotus seat.

This final image is very rare in Buddhist iconography. Jinja Taishō is one of the 16 guardian deities in the Large Prajñāpāramitā Sūtras, and is depicted as having a skull on his forehead, nine skulls on his chest, a baby girl's mask on his belly, and a snake wrapped around his left arm. He appears in popular culture as a character in Xuanzang's Journey to the West and was worshipped in the Shugendo mountain cults in Japan.

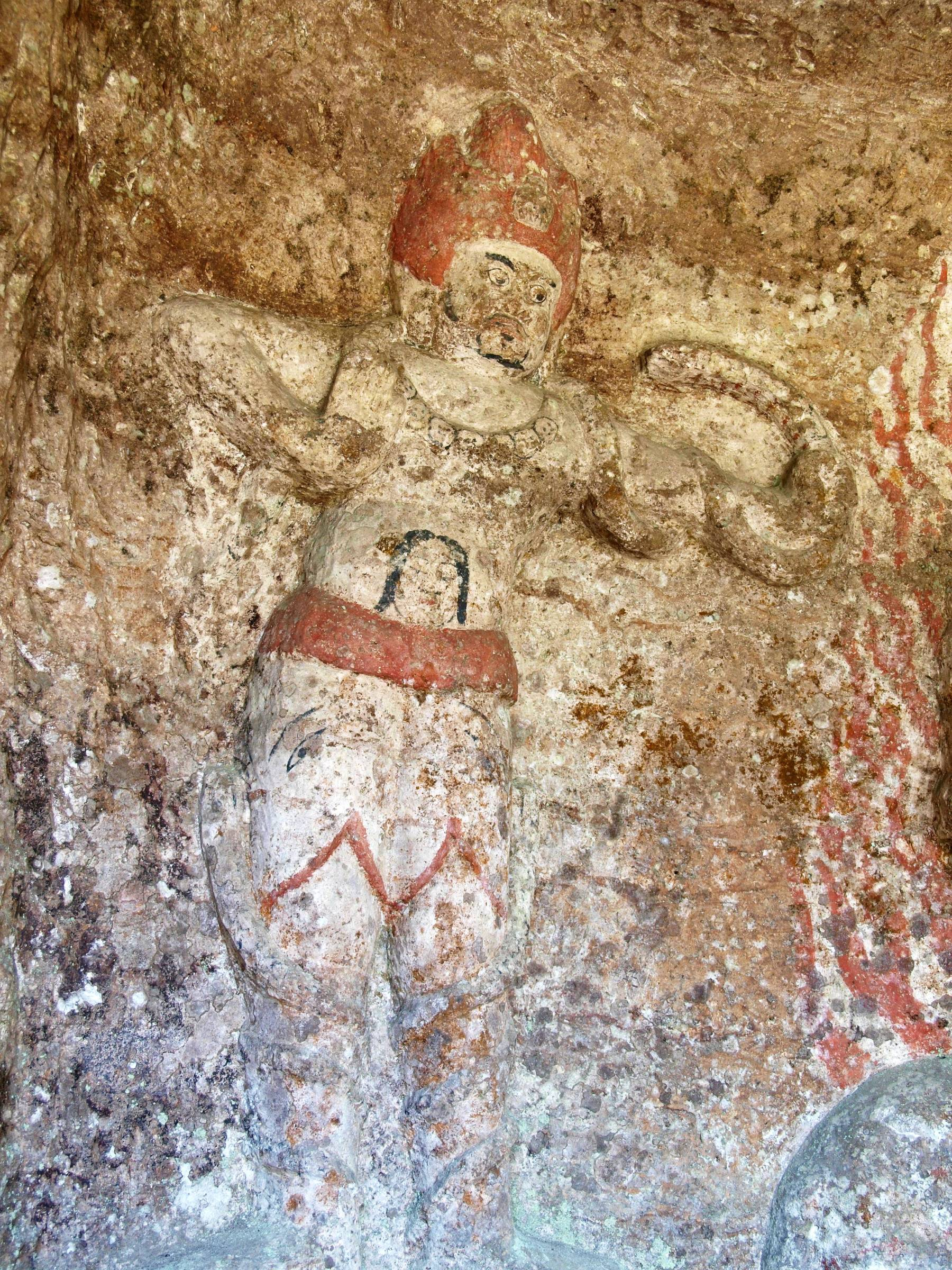
Jinja Taishō

== See also ==
- List of Historic Sites of Japan (Ōita)
