= Onizuka Kofun (Kunisaki) =

- 鬼塚古墳 (Japanese)
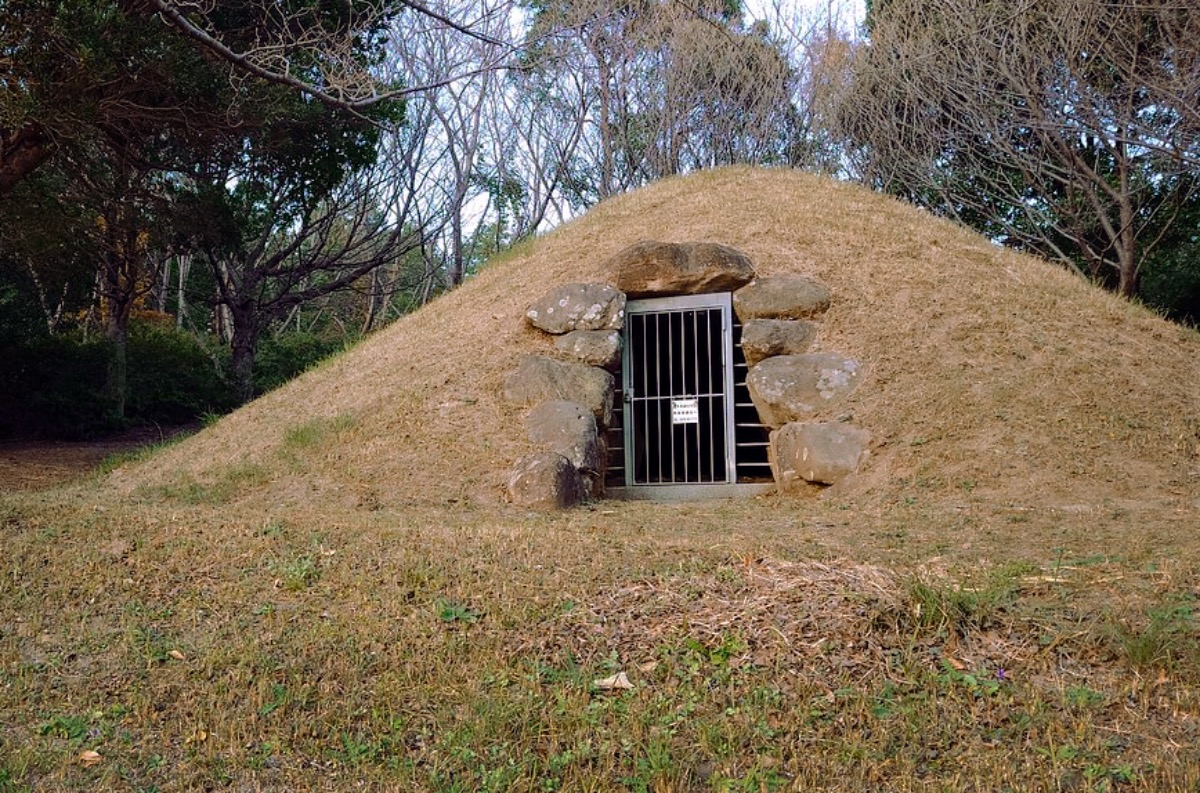
- Onizuka Kofun

- Onizuka Kofun Onizuka Kofun (Kunisaki) (Japan)
- Interactive map of Onizuka Kofun
- 33°40′40.0″N 131°34′58.4″E
- Type: Kofun
- Periods: Kofun period
- Location: Kunisaki, Ōita, Japan
- Region: Kyushu

History
- Built: c.6th century

Site notes
- Public access: Yes (no facilities)

Onizuka Kofun (鬼塚古墳) is a Kofun period keyhole-shaped burial mound, located in the Kunimi-cho neighborhood of the city of Kunisaki, Ōita, on the island of Kyushu Japan. The tumulus was designated a National Historic Site of Japan in 1957.

== Overview ==
The Onizuka Kofun is a slightly elliptical enpun (円墳)-style circular tumulus with a diameter of 10 meters from east-to-west and 13 meters from north-to-south. It is one of the 11 tumuli in the Nishiyama Kofun cluster built on the top of Mt. Ōno, 110 meters above sea level, overlooking Taketatsu Port at the northern tip of the Kunisaki Peninsula. It has a horizontal stone burial chamber which is now semi-exposed, and the interior walls of the burial chamber are decorated with line carvings on the back wall of birds, ships, and people on board, on the left wall a flock of birds, and on the right wall two birds facing each other. Since there is a depiction of a person fishing, it can be inferred that the person buried was a powerful person with deep ties to the sea, but there are many later additions and the carvings are shallow, so which lines belong to the original drawing are difficult to trace. It is estimated to have been constructed around the end of the 6th century.

Grave goods such as iron sword fragments, iron arrowheads, sword fittings, metal rings, glass beads, and Sue ware have unearthed. Currently, the mound has been restored and the surrounding area has been maintained as a park, with the excavated items are on display at the Kunisaki Furusato Exhibition Hall.

The site is approximately 40 minutes by car from Usa Station on the JR Kyushu Nippō Main Line.

== See also ==
- List of Historic Sites of Japan (Ōita)
- Decorated kofun
