= Otōyama Kofun =

- 御塔山古墳 (Japanese)
- Otōyama Kofun Otōyama Kofun (Japan)
- Interactive map of Otōyama Kofun
- 33°24′26.75″N 131°41′53.03″E
- Type: Kofun
- Periods: Kofun period
- Location: Kitsuki, Ōita, Japan
- Region: Kyushu

History
- Built: c.5th century

Site notes
- Public access: Yes (no facilities)

The Otōyama Kofun (御塔山古墳) is a Kofun period burial mound, located in the Karishuku neighborhood of the city of Kitsuki, Ōita Prefecture on the island of Kyushu, Japan. The tumulus, together with the nearby Kogumayama Kofun were collectively designated a National Historic Site of Japan in 2017.

== Overview ==
The Otōyama Kofun is located near the Minosaki fishing port on Beppu Bay in the southeastern part of the Kunisaki Peninsula in northern Ōita Prefecture. It is 500 meters south-southwest of the Kogumayama Kofun. The Otōyama Kofun is an enpun (円墳)-type circular tumulus, built in three stages, with a diameter of 75.5 meters, and has a rectangular bulge approximately 5 meters in length on the south side. There is a moat and outer embankment surrounding the mound. It has been known since at least the Edo Period, when it was opened and found to contain box-shaped sarcophagus within a stone-lined burial chamber, containing human remains. Any grave goods found have long since disappeared. The tumulus was excavated with modern techniques in 1986 and numerous haniwa were found. In addition to cylindrical haniwa, many figurative haniwa in various shapes, including house-shaped, boat-shaped, enclosure-shaped and armor-shaped haniwa, many with designs unique to this site were found. From these artifacts, it is estimated that the tumulus was constructed in the first half of the middle Kofun period (first half of the 5th century) and thus later the Kogumayama Kofun. The use of figurative haniwa began in the Kinai region and subsequently spread to the northeast coast of Kyushu overlooking the Seto Inland Sea, indicating that the area had trade and a close relation to the Yamato Kingdom during this period.

== See also ==
- List of Historic Sites of Japan (Ōita)
