= Chōja Yashiki Kanga ruins =

Archaeological site in Ōita Prefecture, Japan

- 長者屋敷官衙遺跡 (Japanese)
- Chōja Yashiki Kanga ruins Chōja Yashiki Kanga ruins (Japan)
- 33°34′04″N 131°12′20″E
- Type: Kanga ruins
- Periods: Heian period
- Location: Nakatsu, Ōita, Japan
- Region: Kyushu

Site notes
- Public access: Yes (no facilities)
- National Historic Site of Japan

Chōja Yashiki Kanga ruins (長者屋敷官衙遺跡, Chōja yashiki kanga iseki) is an archaeological site with the ruins of a Heian period government administrative complex located in what is now the Nagazoe neighborhood of the city of Nakatsu, Ōita Prefecture, on the island of Kyushu, Japan. The ruins were designated a National Historic Site of Japan in 2010 with the area under protection expanded in 2017.

== Overview ==
In the late Nara period, after the establishment of a centralized government under the Ritsuryō system, local rule over the provinces was standardized under a kokufu (provincial capital), and each province was divided into smaller administrative districts, known as (郡, gun, kōri), composed of 2–20 townships in 715 AD. Each of the units had an administrative complex, or kanga (官衙遺跡) built on a semi-standardized layout based on contemporary Chinese design.

Chōja Yashiki Kanga Ruins are located is located at the northern end of a tongue-shaped plateau that extends from north-to-south on the right bank of the Yamakuni River. Carbonized rice has been known to be excavated in this area since ancient times. For this reason, a legend of the rice warehouses belonging to a rich man once existed in this area, the name of "Chōja Yashiki" came to be associated with the site. In conjunction with the rebuilding of municipal housing, an archaeological excavation was conducted by the Nakatsu City Board of Education in 1995.

The site is a rectangular plot measuring approximately 120 meters from north-to-south and 90 meters from east-to-west. The foundations the dug-out pillar buildings and cornerstone buildings are arranged in an L-shape. Because the buildings were arranged closely together in an orderly manner and a large amount of carbonized rice was found, it is assumed that this area was the tax warehouse area of the administrative complex. The north and west sides of the compound are divided by ditches and rows of fences, but the south and east sides have only one narrow ditch with a width of 0.3-0.4 meters. Carbonized rice has been excavated on the east and south sides of the site, and on the south side, an east–west trench about 1.3-1.6 meters wide has been confirmed 90 meters south of the ditch, so the facility is located on the east side of the plot. In addition, since carbonized rice has been excavated from the east and south sides of this area, it is assumed that similar facilities extend over approximately 210 meters from north-to-south and approximately 130 meters from east-to-west.

It is estimated that the buildings in the area were constructed in the mid to late 8th century and were abolished in the first half of the 10th century. A total of 14 building foundation have been discovered. The history of the building complex can be divided into four periods from the mid-8th century to the early 9th century.The largest building in which thick pillars were used was a 7.2 x 11.7 meter cornerstone building, which indicates a structure of at least nine by three bays. In the Nara period, the building was originally built with pillars placed directly on the ground, but in the Heian period, stones were placed under the pillars. Fragments of round inkstones and earthenware plates with letters written in ink were excavated. In 2016, the remains of a posthole for a ceremonial pole were discovered, the second such case in the country. Further analysis of the carbonized wood revealed that cypress, which did not grow naturally in Kyushu at the time, was used as a building material. This is the first time that the use of cypress has been confirmed in a government office in Kyushu.

A large amount of carbonized rice weighing several tens of kilograms was discovered, and it is assumed that the fire was caused by arson at the kanga of Shimoge District, Buzen Province as described in the Shoku Nihongi. In addition, Sue ware, Haji ware, inkstones, and other artifacts have been uncovered.

The ruins have been backfilled for preservation and are now an empty field. The site is located approximately ten minutes by car from Nakatsu Station on the JR Kyushu Nippō Main Line.

== See also ==
- List of Historic Sites of Japan (Ōita)
