= Oka Domain Nakagawa clan cemetery =

Historic cemeteries in Ōita Prefecture, Japan

- 岡藩主中川家墓所
- Location within Oita Prefecture Location within Japan

Details
- Established: 1612
- Location: Bungo-Ōno and Taketa, Ōita
- Country: Japan
- Coordinates: 32°58′21″N 131°24′08″E
- Type: daimyō cemetery
- Footnotes: National Historic Site of Japan

The Oka Domain Nakagawa clan cemetery (岡藩主中川家墓所, Oka-han-shu Nakagawa-ke bosho) is the cemetery for the successive Nakagawa clan daimyō of Oka Domain of Edo period, Japan. It consists of three separate locations within Taketa and Bungo-Ōno cities in Ōita Prefecture, and was collectively designated a National Historic Site in 1997.

== Overview ==
The Nakagawa clan was a Seiwa Genji clan from Settsu Province, descending from Minamoto no Yorimitsu. Nakagawa Kiyohide entered service with Oda Nobunaga, and his second son Nakagawa Hidenari (中川秀成)(1570 – September 9, 1612) was awarded Oka Domain in Bungo Province by Toyotomi Hideyoshi with a kokudaka of 74,000 koku. He sided with the eastern armies at the 1600 Battle of Sekigahara and retained his position as daimyō under the Tokugawa shogunate. His descendants continued to rule Oka Domain to the Meiji restoration and were subsequent ennobled as counts (hakushaku) under the kazoku peerage system.

=== Hekiun-ji ===
Construction of the temple of Hekiun-ji (碧雲寺) was started in the spring of 1612 by Nakagawa Hidenari. The temple's name is said to come from the name on the temple plaque that Hidenari brought back as a war trophy from Korea. He died in the summer of the same year before the construction was completed, but his funeral was held at the temple. The temple became not only the clan bodaiji, but was also used as a tea ceremony location and as a villa. His grave, and the graves of the second daimyō Hisamori, the fourth daimyō Hisatsune, the fifth daimyō Hisamichi, the sixth daimyō Hisatada, the ninth daimyō Hisamitsu, and the eleventh daimyō Hisanori are located in this temple. The cemetery is surrounded by an earthen wall, and each tombstone with a hōtō-style pagoda, which was once housed in individual mausoleum buildings. These structures no longer exist, except for the mausoleum of the second daimyō Hisamori, which was moved to the neighboring temple of Koryu-ji where remains to this day. Hekiun-ji is about a ten-minute walk from Bungo-Taketa Station on the JR Kyushu Hōhi Main Line.

=== Ofunayama ===
The grave of the third daimyō Nakagawa Hisakiyo (1615-1681) is located on Ōfuneyama (大船山), a mountain to the north of Oka Castle. Noted as an innovative and wise ruler, he was also somewhat of an eccentric, and was also lame from birth. Despite his infirmity, he loved climbing Mount Ofune, usually on the back of one of his servants. According to his will, his grave was located 1300 meters up the mountain, overlooking the jōkamachi of Taketa, and was constructed in the Confucian style.

=== Ko-Fujisan ===
The eighth daimyō, Nakagawa Hisasada, also had a Confucian burial, His grave was located on the hill of Ko-Fujisan (小富士山), south of Oka Castle on a slope which overlooked the castle.

The graves of daimyō other than the ones listed above were located in Edo at the clan's Edo bodaiji at Seisho-ji (青松寺) in Shiba, but have now been relocated to Hekiun-ji.

== See also ==
- List of Historic Sites of Japan (Ōita)
