= Ōita Motomachi Stone Buddhas =

Group of Japanese Buddhist statues

- 大分元町石仏 (Japanese)
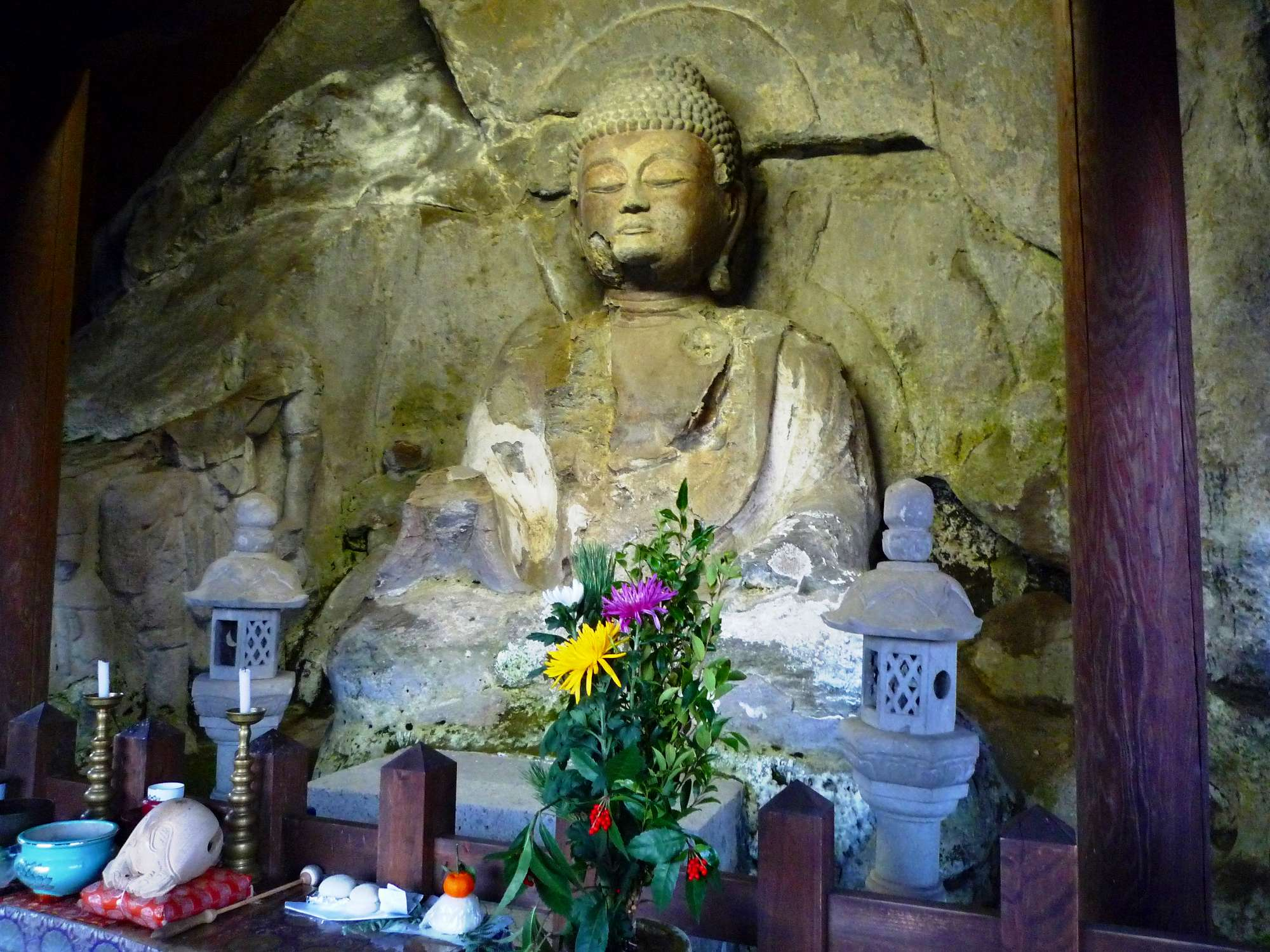

- Location Ōita Motomachi Stone Buddhas (Japan)
- Interactive map of Ōita Motomachi Stone Buddhas
- 33°13′14.1″N 131°36′56.5″E
- Periods: Heian period
- Location: Ōita (city), Ōita Prefecture, Japan
- Region: Kyushu

Site notes
- Public access: Yes

The Ōita Motomachi Stone Buddhas (大分元町石仏, Ōita Motomachi sekibutsu) is a group of religious statues carved in bas-relief into a tuff cliff in Motomachi neighborhood of the city of Ōita, Ōita Prefecture on the island of Kyushu, Japan. The site was designated a National Historic Site of Japan in 1934.

== Overview ==
Constructing Buddha statues out of stone is widely practiced in Buddhist areas in Asia. These images can be divided into three broad types: Magaibutsu (磨崖仏), bas-relief images carved directly into a cliff face, movable independent stone Buddhas carved from cut stone, and cave Buddhas carved inside rock caves, The Ōita Motomachi images can be classed as Magaibutsu.

The Ōita Motomachi statues are located at the eastern end of the Ueno Hill Plateau, approximately 70 meters above sea level, which runs from east to west south of Ōita city. The images are carved out of a tuff rock wall on the west bank of the Ōita River. Commonly known as Iwa Yakushi (岩薬師), the centerpiece is a 5.15-meter-tall (16.9 ft) seated statue of Yakushi Nyorai. Part of the face and chest are missing The hands are also missing; these were made of a separate stones that could be inserted into the body. Per local legend, the statues were carved by Nira, a sculptor who came from Baekje during the reign of Emperor Bidatsu, but this legend not based on any concrete historical documentation, and from the style, the carvings are thought to date from the late Heian period (mid-11th century). The image is carved almost in the round. Yakushi Nyorai is accompanied by a Fudō Myōō Triad on the left, and Bishamon-ten on the right. The carvings are protected by a wooden chapel. On the cliff face on the right side of the covered hall, there are traces of a three-piece Buddha statue with a seated Bodhisattva as a side attendant, but these are so weathered as to be all but unidentifiable.

== See also ==
- List of Historic Sites of Japan (Ōita)
