= Ozakotsujibaru Site =

Archaeological site in Japan

- 小迫辻原遺跡 (Japanese)
- Ozakotsujibaru Site Ozakotsujibaru Site (Japan)
- Interactive map of Ozakotsujibaru Site
- 33°20′21.9″N 130°55′26.0″E
- Type: Settlement trace
- Periods: Kofun period
- Location: Hita, Ōita, Japan
- Region: Kyushu

History
- Built: c.3rd-4th century

Site notes
- Public access: Yes (no facilities)

Ozakotsujibaru Site (小迫辻原遺跡) is an archaeological site with the traces of three Kofun period moated houses, located in the Ozako neighborhood of the city of Hita, Ōita, on the island of Kyushu Japan. The site was designated a National Historic Site of Japan in 1996.

== Overview ==
The Ozakotsujibaru Site is located on a plateau at an elevation of approximately 120 meters, commonly known as Tsujihara, in the northern part of the Hita Basin. Prior to the construction of the Oita Expressway, excavations conducted by the Oita Prefectural Board of Education starting in 1985 uncovered the remains of three ring-moat villages which were built on the northwest side of the plateau from the Yayoi period and three rectangular ring-moat buildings from the early Kofun period in the southeastern part of the plateau. The remains of three moat houses are estimated to date from the end of the 3rd century to the beginning of the 4th century, based on excavated pottery, and are the oldest known residential traces for powerful local clans in the Kofun period.

No.1 Ring Moat House has a square moat approximately 47 meters on each side, with one all-pillar building measuring at least three by two bays inside the moat. No.2 Ring Moat House has a rectangular moat, measuring approximately 37 meters from east-to-west and 36 meters from north-to-south, approximately 3 meters wide at the top and one meter deep. Approximately two meters inside the moat, there was a trench parallel to the moat, 50 cm wide and 30 to 60 cm deep. The inner wall of this ditch is irregularly lined with small holes, suggesting that it was dug to erect a structure such as a fence or wall. Inside were two all-pillar buildings arranged to the north and south. It is assumed that one of these building was a residence used as a place for daily life, and the other was used for political purposes, or a place where ritual ceremonies were held. There is no other example in Japan where two ring-moat ruins have been excavated side by side.

The No.3 Ring Moat House is located a little apart from the No.1 and No.2 ruins. It contained a building measuring three by two bays inside the moat, which is about 20 meters on each side. It is unknown whether these three residence ruins coexisted at the same time or were built at different times, but it is believed that this structure may date from the early Nara period.

The structure of the residences of powerful clans from the Kofun period can be inferred from house-shaped haniwa found in kofun burial mound and house-shaped patterns on bronze mirrors found as grave goods. Around 30 ruins from the 5th to 6th centuries have been excavated, but there are no other ruins from the 3rd to 4th centuries, and thus this is an important site in understanding the state of local power during the process of establishing control by the Yamato State over Kyushu.

The site has been backfilled for preservation, and is now an empty field with an explanatory placard. It is approximately ten minutes by car from Teruoka Station on the JR Kyushu Kyūdai Main Line.

== See also ==
- List of Historic Sites of Japan (Ōita)
