= Ankokuji Village Ruins =

- 安国寺集落遺跡 (Japanese)
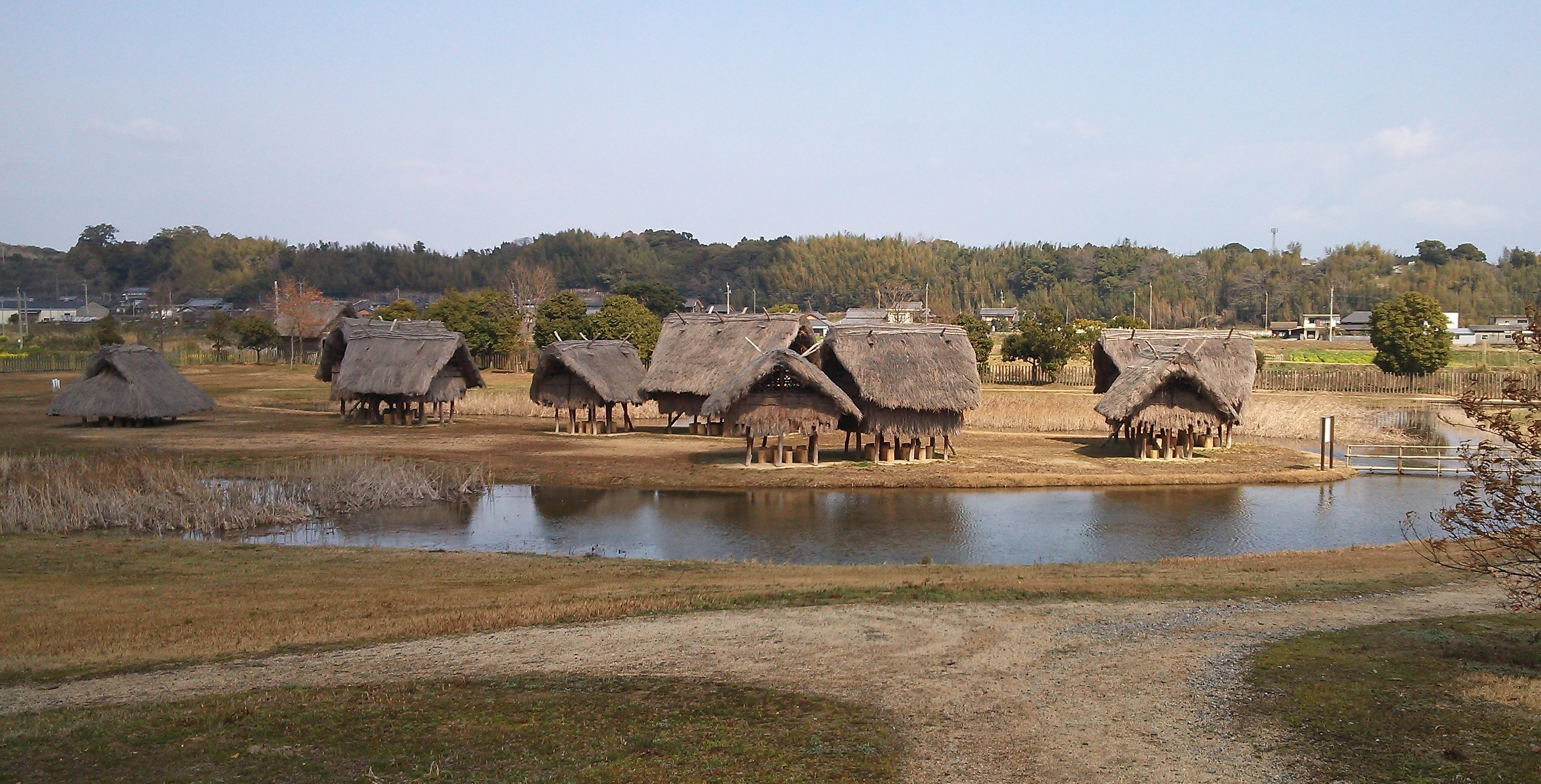
- Ankokuji Village Ruins

- Ankokuji Village Ruins Ankokuji Village Ruins (Japan)
- 33°33′58.6″N 131°42′58.2″E
- Type: Settlement ruins
- Periods: Yayoi period
- Location: Kunisaki, Ōita, Japan
- Region: Kyushu

History
- Built: 2nd century AD

Site notes
- Elevation: 10 m (33 ft)
- Public access: Yes (archaeological park)
- National Historic Site of Japan

The Ankokuji Village Ruins (安国寺集落遺跡, Ankokuji shūraku iseki) is an archaeological site with the traces of a Yayoi period settlement located on the Kunisaki neighborhood of the city of Kunisaki, Ōita Prefecture on the island of Kyushu, Japan. The site was designated a National Historic Site in 1992.

== Overview ==
The Ankokuji Village Ruins is the remains of a village that was built from the Yayoi period to the early Kofun period, located on a terraced fan of low marshland formed by the Tabuka River, about two kilometers from the present-day coastline. The ruins were discovered in 1920 when pottery shards and large tree roots were discovered during a land reclamation project. Because it is a swampy location, organic artifacts are well preserved, and many wooden agricultural tools, architectural components, postholes, plant seeds, etc. were excavated, along with stone tools and a distinctive type of Yayoi pottery. This earthenware, with a comb pattern on a double-rimmed pot, is named "Ankokuji-style pottery" and is found in other locations in eastern Kyushu, making this the type site for this style. More than 300 post holes, thought to be a group of raised buildings, is thought to be the residential complex. Building materials include lumber with joints, round ladders, square lumber, boards, and logs. The settlement appears to have been surrounded by a large U-shaped ditch, two meters deep and up to 22 meters wide, although if this ditch was for defensive purposes or simply for drainage is unknown. As carbonized rice was also excavated, during the first excavations carried out from 1949 to 1952, the site attracted attention as it supported the theory that rice cultivation was introduced into Japan from eastern Kyushu. It has been dubbed the "Western Toro", and compared to the Toro site in Shizuzoka.

Due to the geography of the Kunisaki Peninsula where this site is located, there was only a small area of cultivated land between the sea and the mountains where weak rice cultivation could be practiced, so it believed that the inhabitants were heavily dependent on hunting, fishing, and gathering of wild plants, as well as maritime trade with the Chugoku and Shikoku regions via the Seto Inland Sea. his is supported by artifacts found in middens near the village site.

Currently, the site is maintained as the Yayoi Village/Ankokuji Village Ruins Park, with reconstructions of ancient buildings and a museum. The site is approximately 25-minutes by car from Oita Airport.

== See also ==
- List of Historic Sites of Japan (Ōita)
