= Furumiya Kofun =

- 和泉黄金塚古墳 (Japanese)
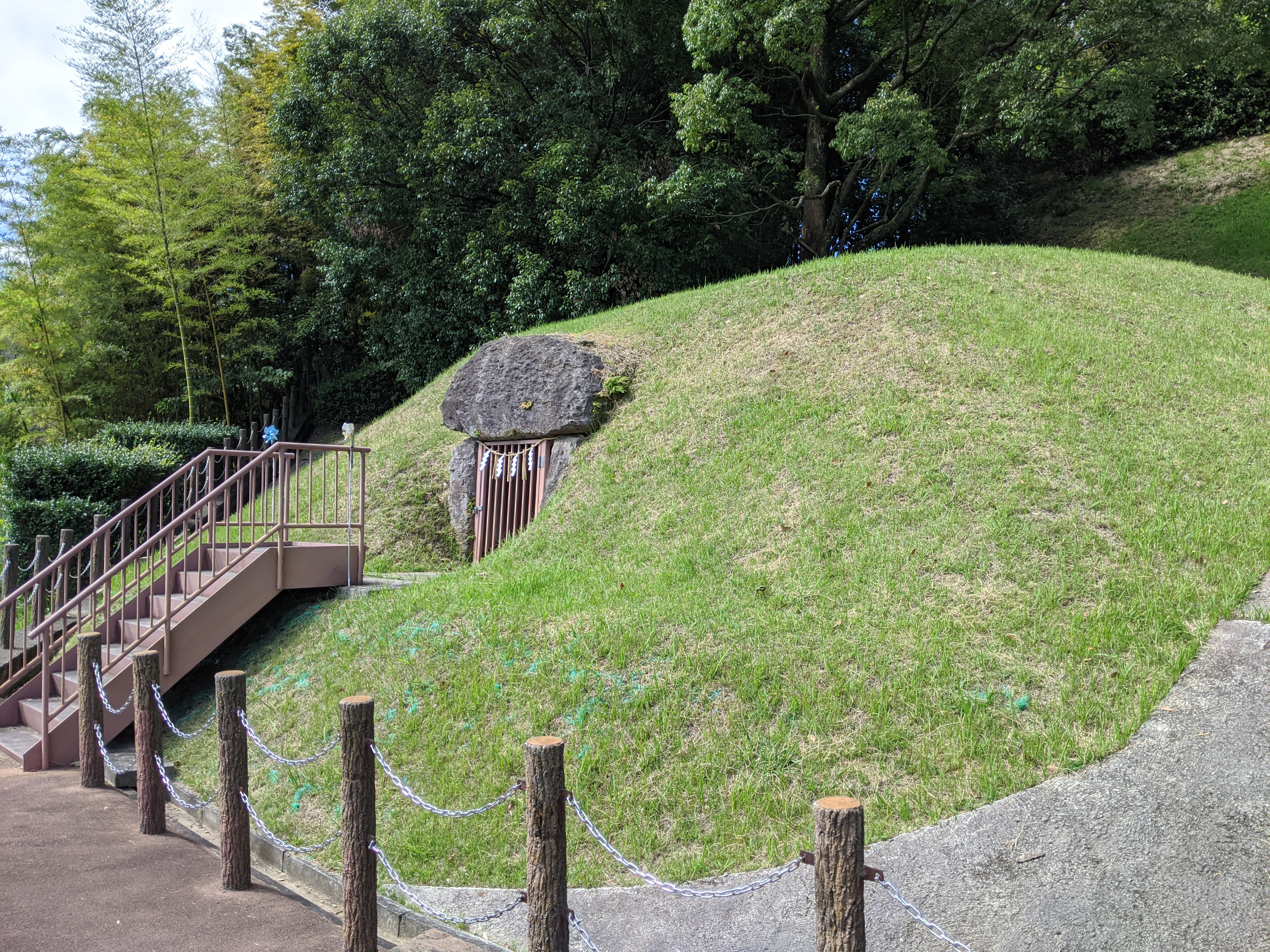
- Furumiya Kofun

- Furumiya Kofun Furumiya Kofun (Japan)
- 33°13′37.2″N 131°35′15.6″E
- Type: Kofun
- Periods: Asuka period
- Location: Ōita, Ōita, Japan
- Region: Kyushu

History
- Built: c.6th-7th century

Site notes
- Public access: Yes (no facilities)
- National Historic Site of Japan

Furumiya Kofun (古宮古墳) is an Asuka period burial mound, located in the Matsubara Dentarukuri Nikku neighborhood of the city of Ōita on the island of Kyushu, Japan. The tumulus was designated a National Historic Site of Japan in 1973.

== Overview ==
The Furumiya Kofun is located in the southwest part of Ōita city, on the southern slope of a low hill overlooking a small valley created by the Bishamon River. It is a hofun (方墳)-style square tumulus with a stone burial chamber as its main interior, measuring 12.45 meters from north-to-south, 12.15 meters from east-to-west, and approximately 4.9 meters in height when viewed from the south side of the front, but since it was built on a slope, the shape seen from the front and side of the tomb is different. It faces the river to the south and the mountains behind it, so the influence of Feng Shui can be seen.

The burial chamber was made by hollowing out a huge block of tuff with a total length of about 2.5 meters, width of 1.65 meters, and height of 1.77 meters, and has a corridor made of cut tuff stones. This style is often seen in the Kinai region, but there is no other example in Kyushu. The stone sarcophagus is also carved out of tuff and measures 2.02 x 0.79 meters, and 0.85 meters high. The side walls are made up of two thick tuff slabs, with a monolithic rock ceiling stone. Grave goods such as the lid of a Sue ware jar and the legs of a small Sue ware ceremonial stand were unearthed. All of the pieces are small fragments, and it is unclear whether they actually belong to this tumulus, but date from the mid to late 7th century.

Judging from the date of construction and the style of the burial chamber similar to that of nobility in Asuka, the person buried was a member of the Oita-no-Kimi clan, who ruled Oita County at the time. It is presumed that he was Ōita no Kimiesaka, who is recorded in the Nihon Shoki as being active on the side of Prince Hito (Emperor Tenmu) in the Jinshin War.

== See also ==
- List of Historic Sites of Japan (Ōita)
