= Yokoo Shell Mound =

Archaeological site in Ōita, Japan

Yokoo Shell Midden
- 横尾貝塚 (Japanese)
- Yokoo Shell Midden Yokoo Shell Mound (Japan)
- Interactive map of Yokoo Shell Midden
- 33°12′12″N 131°40′37″E
- Type: shell midden
- Periods: early-middle Jōmon period
- Location: Ōita, Ōita, Japan
- Region: Kyushu

Site notes
- Public access: Yes

The Yokoo Shell Midden (横尾貝塚, Yokoo kaizuka) is an archaeological site in the Yokoo neighborhood of the city of Ōita on the island of Kyushu, Japan. The midden was designated a National Historic Site of Japan in 2008.

== Overview ==
During the early to middle Jōmon period (approximately 4000 to 2500 BC), sea levels were five to six meters higher than at present, and the ambient temperature was also two deg C higher. During this period, the Kantō region was inhabited by the Jōmon people, many of whom lived in coastal settlements. The middens associated with such settlements contain bone, botanical material, mollusc shells, sherds, lithics, and other artifacts and ecofacts associated with the now-vanished inhabitants, and these features, provide a useful source into the diets and habits of Jōmon society. Most of these middens are found along the Pacific coast of Japan.

The Yokoo shell midden is located at the tip of the Tsurusaki Hills, which stretches on the left bank of the Ōno River, about seven kilometers inland from the current coastline, at an elevation of six to eight meters. It is a complex site that has been divided into five periods, from the early Jōmon period to the late early Jōmon period. The area has long been known for excavated shells, and it was excavated in 1965 in conjunction with expansion work on a prefectural road. The midden showed clear stratification, with the third layer consisting almost entirely of Yamato shijimi, a shellfish that lives where seawater and river water meet. It is believed that the area was located in the tidal zone during the early Jōmon period (about 6,000 years ago) and again in the middle Jōmon period (about 5,000 years ago). The coastline is then thought to have extended to this area, as the Yamato shijimi layer was replaced by a seawater clam shell layers. However, in the later stages, shells became increasingly fewer in number, probably because the coastline receded and active shellfish collecting activities ceased. Ruins from the middle Jōmon period are rare in Ōita Prefecture, but this shell midden yielded a wealth of artifacts from the middle Jōmon period, including a large number of polished Funamoto-style Jōmon pottery from the Seto Inland Sea and associated striated pattern pottery, stone tools, bone and horn tools. The accumulation of shellfish layers shows that people have been living in this area for several thousand years. More than a dozen human bones from various periods have also been discovered in the shell midden. The surrounding area was found to have a number of foundations for pit dwellings, earthen pit graves and prehistoric storage pits. Furthermore, in the lowest layer (fifth layer), pottery from the early Jōmon period was unearthed, attracting attention as one of the few sites of early Jōmon pottery in the prefecture.

The site has now been backfilled and is an empty field with an explanatory placard. The Yokoo shell midden site is approximately 15 minutes by car from Tsurusaki Station on the JR Kyushu Nippō Main Line.

== See also ==
- List of Historic Sites of Japan (Ōita)
