= Garandoya Kofun =

- ガランドヤ古墳 (Japanese)
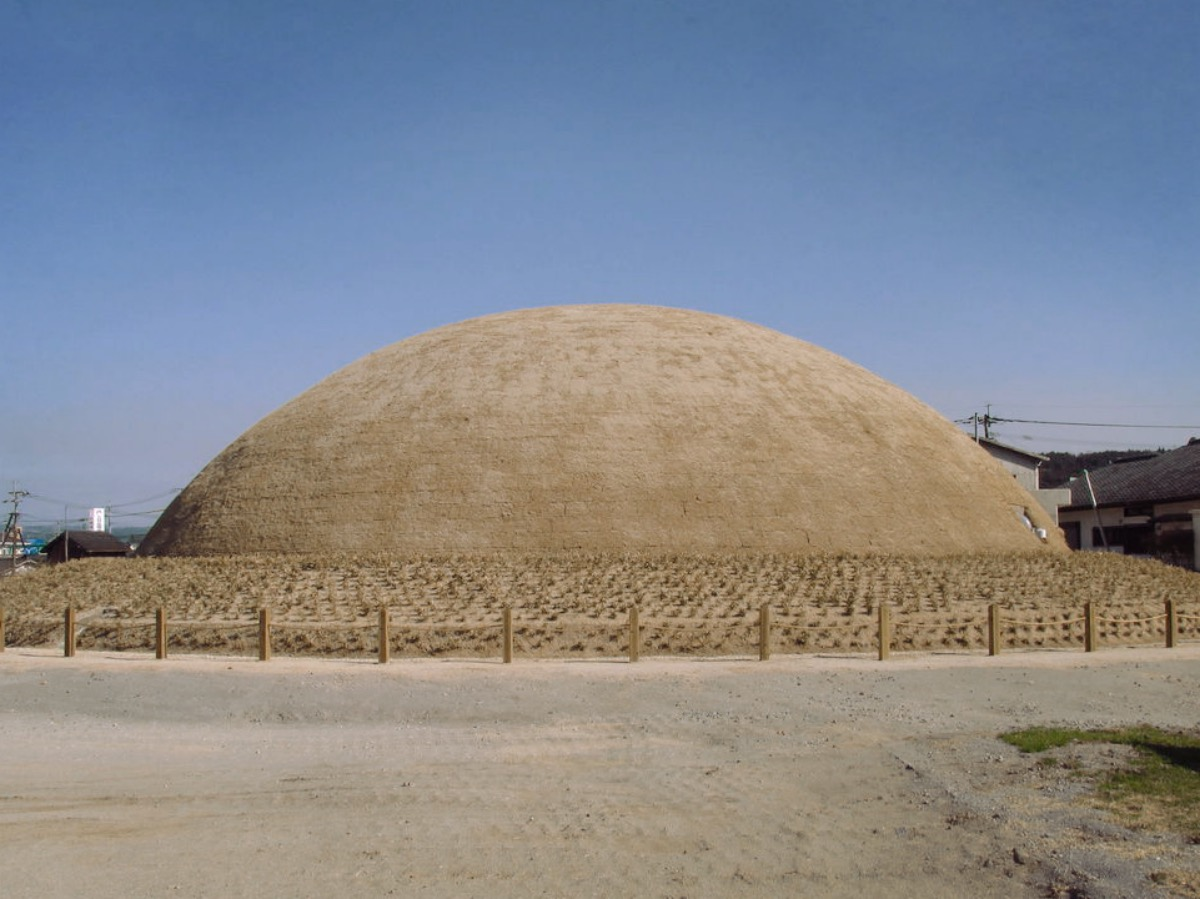
- Garandoya Kofun after reconstruction

- Garandoya Kofun Garandoya Kofun (Japan)
- 33°18′50.5″N 130°54′19.3″E
- Type: Kofun
- Periods: Kofun period
- Location: Hita, Ōita, Japan
- Region: Kyushu

History
- Built: c.6th-7th century

Site notes
- Public access: Yes (no facilities)
- National Historic Site of Japan

Garandoya Kofun (ガランドヤ古墳) is a pair of Kofun period Decorated kofun burial mounds, located in the Ishii neighborhood of the city of Hita on the island of Kyushu, Japan. The tumuli were collectively designated a National Historic Site of Japan in 1933.

== Overview ==
The Garandoya Kofun cluster consists of three circular enpun (円墳)-style kofun, located on the left bank terrace of the Mikuma River (upstream part of the Chikugo River) in the southeastern part of Hita City. Kofun No. 2 is located about 50 meters west of Kofun No. 1, and Kofun No. 3 is located about 25 meters southeast of Kofun No. 1. Two of these, No. 1 and No. 2, are both decorated kofun, and are estimated to date from the mid to late 6th century. These tumuli is thought to belong to the decorated tumulus culture area of the Chikugo River basin, along with the nearby Anakannon Kofun and Hōonjiyama Kofun Cluster.

Kofun No.1

The mound of Kofun No.1 has been completely lost, leaving only the exposed stone burial chamber. This is a rectangular stone chamber with a double-sleeved structure and a horizontal entry, approximately 4.3 meters long and 3.0 meters wide. On the back wall of the burial chamber, figures with outstretched hands, a horse, a boat, a bird, and a circular pattern are depicted in red and green pigments. Grave goods such as horse harnesses, ornaments, iron arrowheads, earrings, Sue ware, and Haji ware pottery were recovered, indicating that it was built in the latter half of the 6th century. An earth-covered concrete structure to protect the burial chamber was constructed in 2014.

Kofun No.2

Kofun No.2 retains its earthen mound, with a diameter of approximately 20 meters and height of 9 meters, but the eastern side of the stone burial chamber is exposed. The burial chamber is a horizontal multi-chamber cave-style stone structure, approximately 3.3 meters long. Although not in a good state of preservation, on the wall at the back is a mural depicting a horseman with a drawn bow, a concentric circle pattern, and a continuous chevron pattern, painted in green pigment on a red undercoat. Grave goods included straight iron swords, ornaments, and Sue ware pottery. X-ray examination of sword revealed that it had an inlaid sword guard.

Kofun No. 3

The site of Kofun No. 3 is currently used as a modern graveyard, and tumulus has been almost completely destroyed. It is not part of the National Historic Site, and it is unknown if it was once a decorated kofun.

The Garandoya Kofun are approximately 15 minutes by car from Hita Station on the JR Kyushu Kyūdai Main Line.

== See also ==
- List of Historic Sites of Japan (Ōita)
- Decorated kofun
