= Kamezuka Kofun =

Burial mound in Kyushu, Japan

- 亀塚古墳 (Japanese)
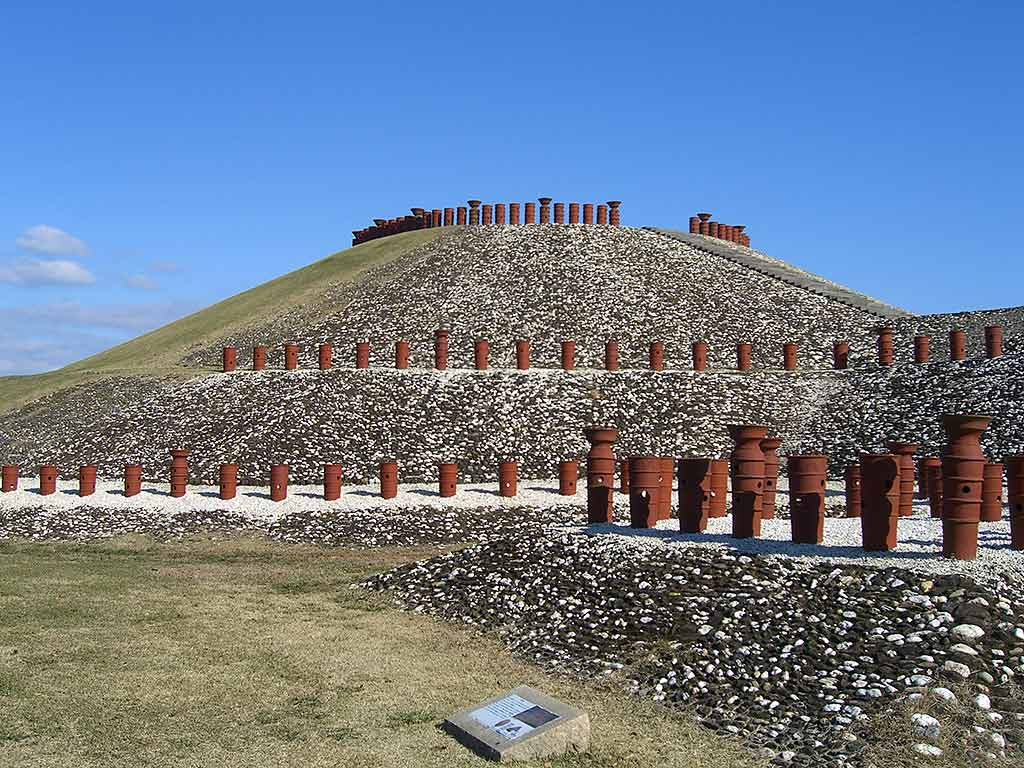
- Kamezuka Kofun

- Kamezuka Kofun Kamezuka Kofun (Japan)
- Interactive map of Kamezuka Kofun
- 33°14′5″N 131°44′22.5″E
- Type: Kofun
- Periods: Kofun period
- Location: Ōita, Ōita, Japan
- Region: Kyushu

History
- Built: c.4th-5th century

Site notes
- Public access: Yes (no facilities)

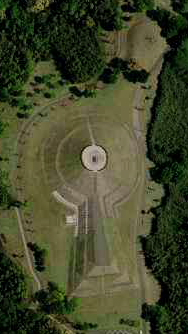
Aerial view of Kamezuka Kofun

Kamezuka Kofun (亀塚古墳) is a Kofun period keyhole-shaped burial mound, located in the Sato neighborhood of the city of Ōita on the island of Kyushu, Japan. The tumulus was designated a National Historic Site of Japan in 1996. It is one of the largest burial mounds in Ōita Prefecture, along with the Ogumayama Kofun in Kitsuki, and is estimated to have been constructed in the Toyokuni area in the early 5th century (mid-Kofun period). Due to the recent development of residential areas, it has been found to have been part of a cluster of burial mounds, now named the "Kamezuka Kofun Cluster".

== Overview ==
The Kamezuka Kofun is located on a hill on the west bank of the Nyu River mouth. It is a zenpō-kōen-fun (前方後円墳), which is shaped like a keyhole, having one square end and one circular end, when viewed from above. The tumulus is a three-tier structure with the front section facing south, with a total length of 116 meters (anterior section 52 meters wide x 7 meters high, posterior circular section 64 meters in diameter x 10 meters high). The tumulus was covered with white quartz stone as fukiishi and surrounded by cylindrical haniwa. There are two burial facilities in the posterior circular section.The first is a burial chamber filled with a large box-shaped sarcophagus measuring 3.2 meters in length, and the second is a later burial located at the top of the east side. Both burial chambers have been robbed in antiquity, but fragments of armor and iron swords, magatama, jasper beads, and small glass beads indicate that there were once a large amount of grave goods. From the construction style and remaining grave goods, the tumulus is estimated to date from the end of the 4th century to the first half of the 5th century.

Per local legend, this tumulus is the grave of the King of Amabe (Amabe no Kimi), and there is an entry in the Nihon Shoki indicating that a Kingdom of Amabe once existed in this area.

Although little maintenance had been performed on the tumulus prior to its designated as a national historic site in 1996, the mound was in relatively good preservation. A restoration project has transformed the surrounding area into the "Kamezuka Kofun Park" for tourism development, and the tumulus is now decorated with replicas of fukiishi and haniwa in an effort to restore it to what is believed to have been its original appearance. The adjacent Amabe Kofun Museum has a number of diorama and displays of artifacts from kofun from various locations around the prefecture. The site is a 30-minute walk from Sakanoichi Station on the JR Kyushu Nippō Main Line.

== See also ==
- List of Historic Sites of Japan (Ōita)
