= Kawabe-Takamori Kofun Cluster =

Group of Kofun-period burial mounds in Ōita, Japan

- 川部・高森古墳群 (Japanese)
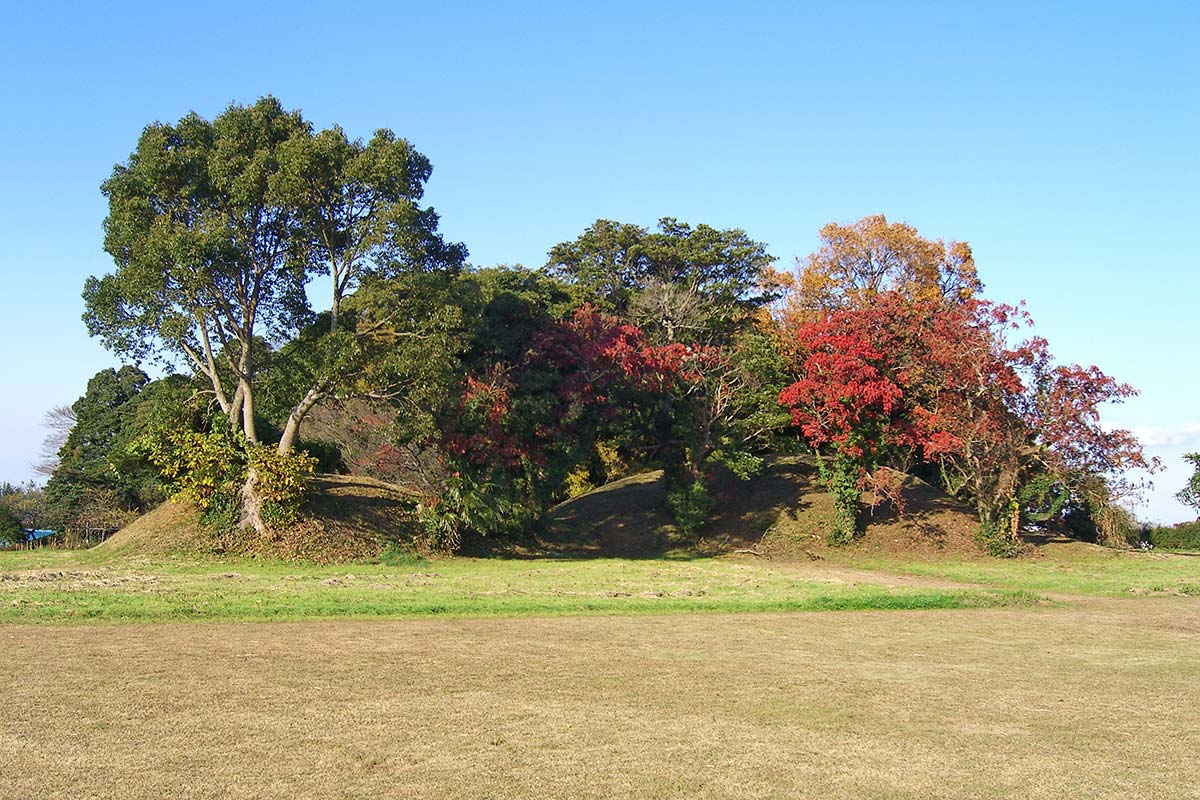
- Akazuka Kofun within the Kawabe-Takamori Kofun Cluster

- Kawabe-Takamori Kofun Cluster Kawabe-Takamori Kofun Cluster (Japan)
- Interactive map of Kawabe-Takamori Kofun Cluster
- 33°32′33″N 131°21′57″E
- Type: Kofun custer
- Periods: Kofun period
- Location: Usa, Ōita, Japan
- Region: Kyushu

History
- Built: c.3rd to 6th century

Site notes
- Public access: Yes (no facilities)

Kawabe-Takamori Kofun Cluster (川部・高森古墳群) is a group Kofun period burial mounds, located in the Kyozuka, Takamori neighborhood of the city of Usa, Ōita, on the island of Kyushu Japan. The tumuli were collectively designated a National Historic Site of Japan in 1980.

== Overview ==
The Kawabe Takamori Kofun cluster is located on a plateau on the right bank of the Yakan River, which flows from south to north in Usa City, and consists of six keyhole-shaped zenpō-kōen-fun (前方後円墳), which are shaped like a keyhole, having one square end and one circular end, when viewed from above., as well as around 120 enpun (円墳)-style round tombs and surrounding ditch tombs. It is the largest tumulus group in Oita Prefecture, and the second largest in Kyushu after the Saitobaru Kofun Cluster in Miyazaki Prefecture, which consists of approximately 320 tumuli.

There is no regularity in the arrangement of the six keyhole-shaped tombs, and their axial directions vary. Many of the surrounding burial mounds and ditch tombs cannot be immediately identified as burial mounds because their mounds have disappeared. It is speculated that the people buried in these keyhole-shaped tumuli are thought to be chiefs who ruled the Usa region during the Kofun period, perhaps members of the Usa clan, and the surrounding tumuli and surrounding ditch graves are the graves of those family members and their vassals. The fact that burial mounds were continuously constructed in the same area between the 3rd and 6th centuries suggests that stable rule was in place for a long period of time.

The area is now preserved as the Usa Fudoki no Oka Park, which is approximately 10 minutes by car from JR Kyushu Usa Station. Some of the artifacts excavated from the Kawabe-Takamori Kofun cluster are on display at the branch of the Ōita Prefectural Museum of History located within the Usa Fudoki no Oka Park. These were collectively designated a National Important Cultural Property in 1980.

=== Akatsuka Kofun ===
The Akatsuka Kofun (赤塚古墳) is a keyhole-shaped zenpokoenfun with a total length of 57.5 meters, a posterior diameter of 36 meters and height of 4.8 meters, an anterior width of 21 meters and height of 2.5 meters. It is said to be the oldest keyhole-shaped tumulus in Kyushu, built at the end of the 3rd century. It has an dry moat around it with a width of 8.5 meters to 11 meters. The stone burial chamber has a box-type sarcophagus. During archaeological excavations in 1921, grave goods such as four triangular-rimmed divine beast bronze mirrors, one triangular-rimmed dragon and tiger bronze mirror, a jasper ball, an iron sword piece, and an iron ax were unearthed. The bronze mirrors are said to be the same as those excavated from Tsubai Ōtsukayama Kofun (Kyoto Prefecture), Ishizukayama Kofun (Fukuoka Prefecture), and Haraguchi Tumulus (same), and were given to the chiefs of various regions by the early Yamato monarchy.

=== Mengadaira Kofun ===
The Mengadaira Kofun (免ヶ平古墳) is currently in the shape of a round tomb with a diameter of 30.5 meters and a height of 4 meters, but it is estimated that it was originally a keyhole-shaped zenpokoenfun with a total length of about 50 meters. An dry moat has been dug around the mound. A split bamboo-shaped wooden coffin was placed in a pit-style stone burial chamber made of andesite in the center of the posterior circle, and grave goods included a diagonal-rimmed bronze mirror with two gods and two beasts, a triangular-rimmed bronze mirror with three gods and three beasts, a magatama made of jadeite, and an iron sword, iron spears, axes, and daggers have been unearthed. In addition, the bones of a young woman, a diagonal-edge bronze mirror of two gods and two beasts, a magatama made of jadeite, a jasper bead made of jasper, a stone chime, and a sword were unearthed from a box-shaped sarcophagus housed in a secondary burial the southern part of the posterior circular portion. It is estimated that the tumulus was built in the latter half of the 4th century.

=== Fukushoji Kofun ===
The Fukushoji Kofun (福勝寺古墳) is a keyhole-shaped zenpokoenfun with a total length of 78 meters, a posterior diameter of 54 meters and height of 7.5 meters, an anterior width of 22 meters and height of 3.5 meters. It is the largest keyhole-shaped tumulus in this group of kofun and the fourth largest in Oita Prefecture. It is estimated to have been constructed in the first half of the 5th century. It is also called the Kasugayama Kofun (春日山古墳). The interior has not been investigated.

=== Kurumazaka Kofun ===
The Kurumazaka Kofun (車坂古墳) is a keyhole-shaped zenpokoenfun with a total length of 58 meters, a posterial diameter of 36 meters and height of 4.5 meters, an anterior width of 21 meters and height of 3.5 meters. It is estimated that it was built in the 5th century, following Fukushoji Kofun. It has a dry moat ranging from 11 meters to 22 meters wide from the east to the south. Next to the tumulus is a small round tumulus called the Jizōdō Kofun, which is possibly a baizuka ancillary tomb. The interior has not been investigated.

=== Kakubō Kofun ===
The Kakubō Kofun (角房古墳) is a keyhole-shaped zenpokoenfun with a total length of 46 meters, a posterior diameter of 30 meters and height of 4 meters, and an anterior width of 18 meters. It is located in a place facing the Yakan River. Part of the front part has disappeared. It is estimated that it was built in the 5th century, following Fukushoji Kofun and Kurumazaka Kofun. It dry an empty moat around it with a width of 7 to 12 meters. The interior has not been investigated.

=== Tsurumi Kofun ===
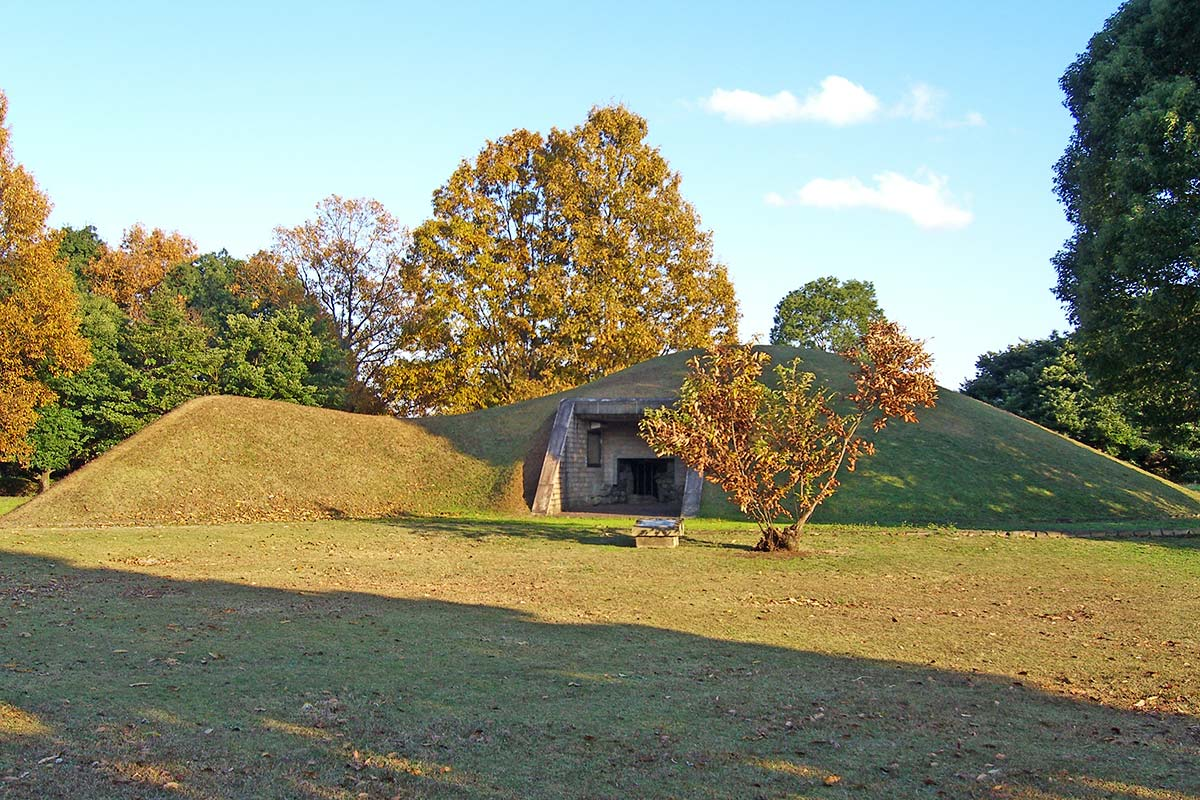
Tsurumi Kofun

The Tsurumi Kofun (鶴見古墳) is a keyhole-shaped zenpokoenfun with a total length of 31 meters, a posterior diameter of 21 meters and height of 3 meters, an anterior width of 17 meters and a height of 2 meters. It has a short and wide anterior portion, which is characteristic of late keyhole-shaped tumuli, and is estimated to be the last keyhole-shaped tumulus built in the Kawabe-Takamori Kofun cluster, built in the mid-6th century. The interior is a one-sleeve, horizontal cave-style stone burial chamber with a depth of 2.8 meters, a width of 2 meters, and a ceiling height of 2.5 meters, and can be viewed. Among the grave goods excavated were small glass beads, copper chimes, earrings, iron arrowheads, swords, Haji ware, and Sue ware pottery.

== See also ==
- List of Historic Sites of Japan (Ōita)
