= Gorintō =

Japanese funerary pagoda

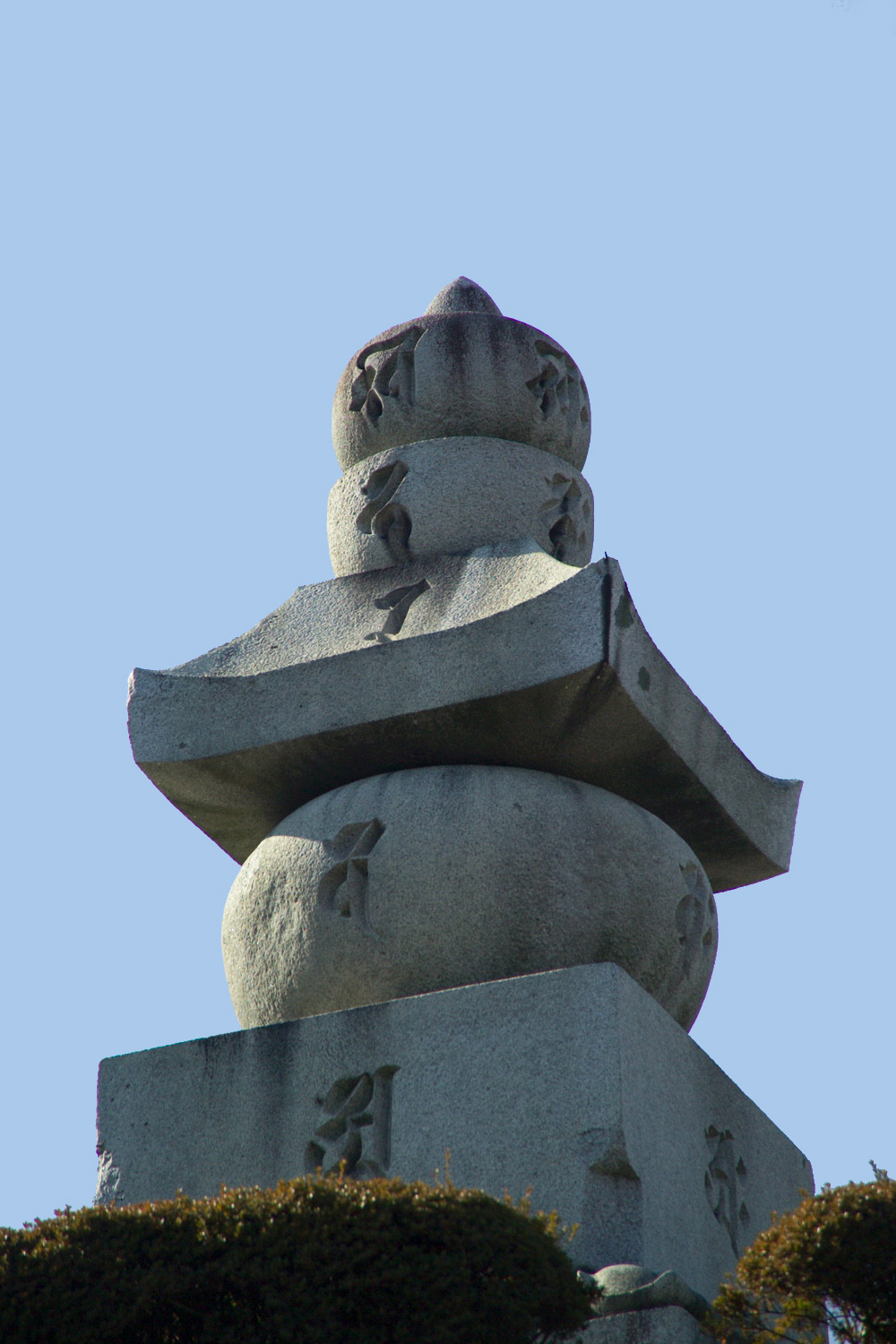
A gorintō on top of the Mimizuka with Siddhaṃ inscriptions

Gorintō (五輪塔; "five-ringed tower") is a Japanese type of Buddhist pagoda believed to have been first adopted by the Shingon and Tendai sects during the mid Heian period. It is used for memorial or funerary purposes and is therefore common in Buddhist temples and cemeteries. It is also called gorinsotōba or gorinsotoba (五輪卒塔婆) ("five-ringed stupa") or goringedatsu (五輪解脱), where the term sotoba is a transliteration of the Sanskrit word stupa. The stupa was originally a structure or other sacred building containing a relic of Buddha or of a saint, then it was gradually stylized in various ways and its shape can change quite a bit according to the era and to the country where it is found. Often offertory strips of wood with five subdivisions and covered with elaborate inscriptions also called sotoba can be found at tombs in Japanese cemeteries (see photo below). The inscriptions contain sūtra texts and the posthumous name of the dead person. These can be considered stupa variants.

== Structure and meaning ==
Parts of a Gorintō

In all its variations, the gorintō includes five rings (although that number can often be difficult to detect by decoration), each having one of the five shapes symbolic of the Five Elements (Mahabhuta in Sanskrit, or Godai in Japanese): the earth ring (cube), the water ring (sphere), the fire ring (pyramid), the air ring (crescent), and the ether ring (or energy, or void). The last two rings (air and ether) are visually and conceptually united into a single subgroup. The last shape, ether, is the one that changes most according to the country, and in Japan it is close to that of a lotus flower. The rings express the idea that after death our physical bodies will go back to their original, elemental form. Gorintō are usually made of stone, but some built in wood, metal, or crystal exist.

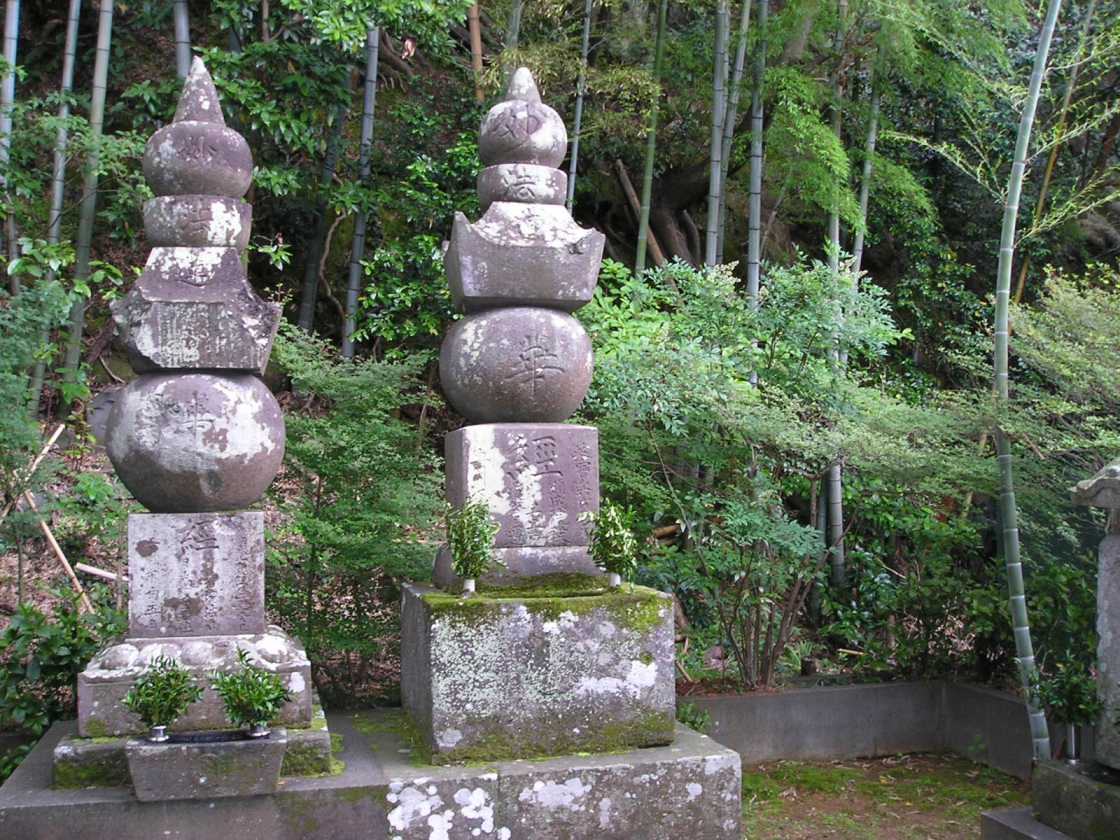
Gorintō bearing Lotus Sutra carvings

On each section are often carved from top to bottom the Sanskrit letters kha (void, or Kū (空) in Japanese), ha (air, or Fū (風)), ra (fire, or Ka (火)), va (water, or Sui (水)), and a (earth, or Chi (地)), and in Nichiren and Tendai temples sometimes a gorintō will have carved on it the name of the Lotus Sutra (妙法蓮華経, myōhō-renge-kyō) (see photo).

The gorintō as a symbol belongs to Mikkyō (密教) literally "secret teachings", term often translated as "esoteric Buddhism"), a Japanese term that refers to the esoteric Vajrayāna practices of the Shingon Buddhist school and the related practices that make up part of the Tendai school. In those esoteric disciplines, the first two shapes (the cube and the sphere) represent the most perfect doctrine, and are supposed to contain in themselves the other three. Together they represent the Jitsuzaikai (実在界; lit. 'real world'), that is the realm of perfect understanding, whereas the others constitute the Henkai (変界; lit. 'world of mutation')，or the world of impermanence, which includes the genshōkai (現象界), the world we live in.

On a second level of symbolism, each part of the gorintō also represents an element of change in both Jitsuzaikai and Henkai.

- The top symbol fuses the shape of a crescent, representing wisdom, and a triangle, representing principle. The fusion of these qualities in the Genshōkai and Henkai represents perfection, or Buddhahood.
- The crescent of water represents receptivity, and is similar to a cup ready to receive from the heavens.
- The triangle is a point of transition between two worlds and as such represents both unification and movement. It indicates the activity necessary to reach Enlightenment.
- The circle represents completion, or Wisdom attainment.
- The square is a symbol of the four elements.

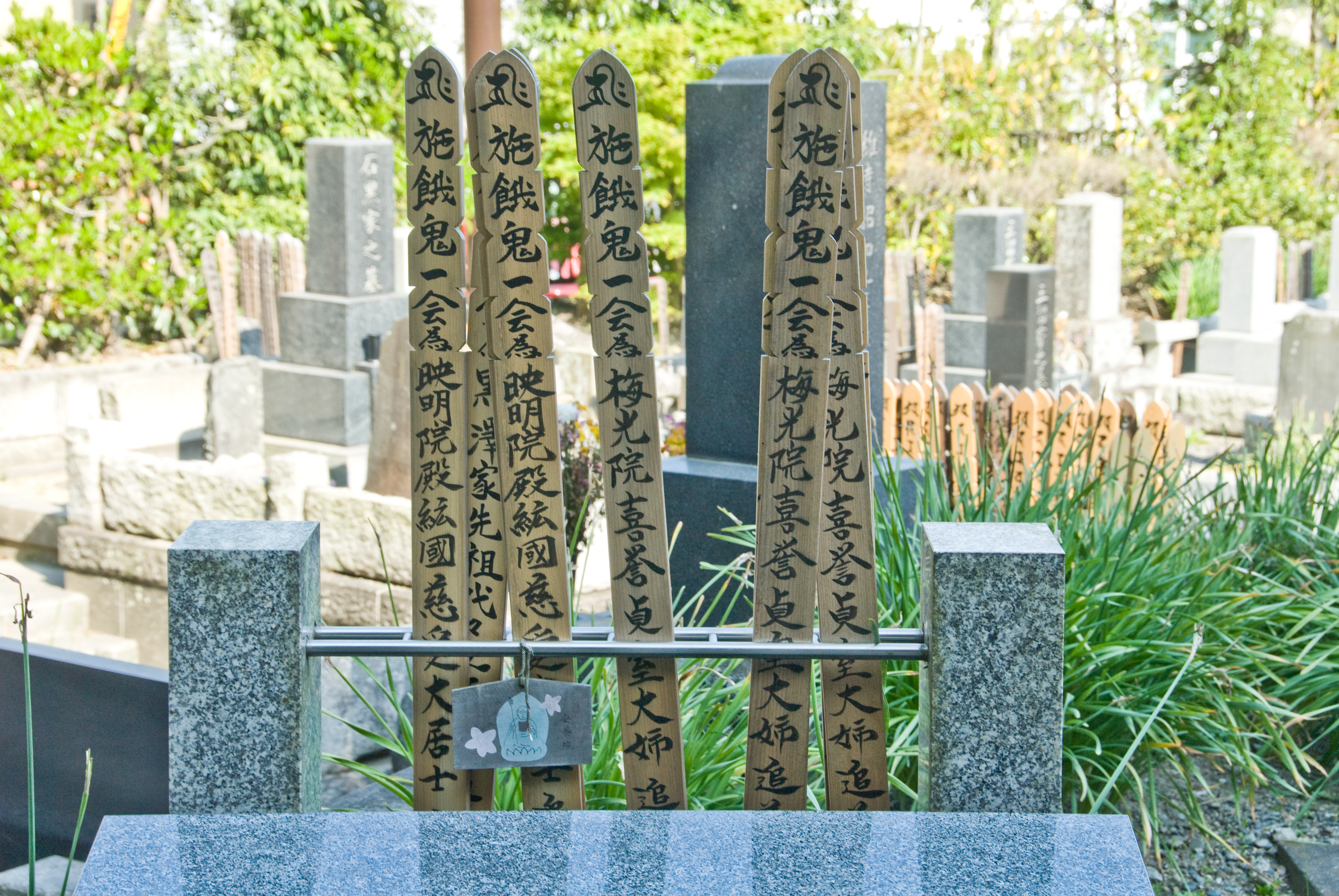
Some wooden sotoba at Akira Kurosawa's tomb. Note the division in five sections.

On a last level of symbolism, the shapes represent the order in which the student progresses in their spiritual studies.

- The square is the basis, the will to attain perfection.
- The circle is the attainment of equanimity.
- The triangle represents the energy created in pursuit of the truth.
- The crescent represents the development of intuition and awareness.
- The topmost shape represents perfection.

== History in Japan ==
The theory of five elements was born in India, but the development of the Japanese gorintō shows the deep influence of Mikkyō, and in particular of Kūkai and Kakuban. The use of gorintō is thought to have begun in the second half of the Heian period. The oldest known examples can be found at Chūsonji, Iwate Prefecture, are a mix of gorintō and hōtō (two-storied Buddhist tower) and go back to 1169. They then came into normal use during the Kamakura period and are still widely used today for memorial monuments and tombs, particularly but not exclusively in Buddhist temples. A gorintō is for example the traditional headstone shape of a Shingon sect grave.
