= Yasumasa Shigeno =

Japanese politician (1941–2021)

- 重野 安正
- Shigeno in 2011

Member of the House of Representatives
- In office 11 September 2005 – 16 November 2012
- Preceded by: Multi-member district
- Succeeded by: Seishirō Etō
- Constituency: Kyushu PR (2005–2009); Ōita 2nd (2009–2012)
- In office 25 June 2000 – 10 October 2003
- Constituency: Kyushu PR

Member of the Ōita Prefectural Assembly
- In office 1975–2000
- Constituency: Ōita City

Personal details
- Born: 1 December 1941 Notsu, Ōita, Japan
- Died: 9 April 2021 (aged 79) Ōita City, Ōita, Japan
- Party: Social Democratic
- Other political affiliations: Socialist (before 1996)
- Website: e-oita.jp/shigeno

Yasumasa Shigeno (重野 安正, Shigeno Yasumasa; 1 December 1941 – 9 April 2021) was a Japanese politician who served as member of the House of Representatives for the Social Democratic Party. In 2010 he was Secretary General of his party.

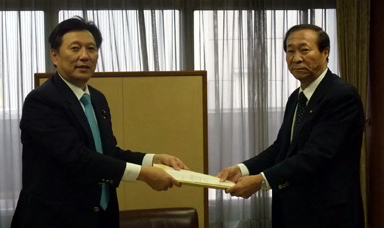
Shigeno with Yoshinori Suematsu (22 February 2011)
