= Ōita 2nd district =

- Parliamentary constituency for the Japanese House of Representatives
- Numbered map of Ōita Prefecture single-member districts
- Prefecture: Ōita
- Proportional District: Kyushu
- Electorate: 259,442

Current constituency
- Created: 1994
- Seats: One
- Party: LDP
- Representative: Ken Hirose
- Municipalities: Cities of Bungo-ōno, Hita, Saiki, Taketa, Tsukumi, Yufu, Usuki, and part of Ōita city District of Kusu

Ōita 2nd district (大分県第2区, Ōita-ken dai-niku or simply 大分2区, Ōita-niku ) is a single-member constituency of the House of Representatives in the national Diet of Japan located in Ōita Prefecture.

== Areas covered ==
=== Since 2013 ===
- Part of Ōita city
- Bungo-Ōno
- Hita
- Saiki
- Taketa
- Tsukumi
- Yufu
- Usuki
- Kusu District

=== 2002 - 2013 ===
- Hita
- Saiki
- Taketa
- Tsukumi
- Usuki
- Kitaamabe District
- Minamiamabe District
- Naoiri District
- Kusu District
- Ōita District
- Ōno District
- Hita District

=== 1994 - 2002 ===
- Part of Ōita city
- Saiki
- Taketa
- Tsukumi
- Usuki
- Kitaamabe District
- Minamiamabe District
- Naoiri District
- Ōno District

== List of representatives ==
Election	Representative	Party	Notes
1996	Seishirō Etō	LDP	
2000	Seishirō Etō	LDP	
2003	Seishirō Etō	LDP	
2005	Seishirō Etō	LDP	
2009	Yasumasa Shigeno	SDP	
2012	Seishirō Etō	LDP	
2014	Seishirō Etō	LDP	
2017	Seishirō Etō	LDP	
2021	Seishirō Etō	LDP	
2024	Ken Hirose	Independent	
2026	Ken Hirose	LDP	

== Election results ==
=== 2026 ===
2026
Party	Candidate	Votes	%	±%
LDP	Ken Hirose	89,082	61.5	
Centrist Reform	Hajime Yoshikawa	55,817	38.5	▼0.3
Registered electors		247,816		
Turnout			59.93	▲0.77
LDP hold				

=== 2024 ===
2024
Party	Candidate	Votes	%	±%
Independent	Ken Hirose	62,699	42.51	New
CDP	Hajime Yoshikawa (Won PR seat)	57,234	38.81	▼10.98
LDP	Seishirō Etō (Incumbent)	27,553	18.68	▼31.53
Majority		5,465	3.70	
Registered electors		253,781		
Turnout			59.16	▼1.29
Independent gain from LDP				

=== 2021 ===
2021
Party	Candidate	Votes	%	±%
LDP	Seishirō Etō (Incumbent)	79,433	50.21	▼3.06
CDP	Hajime Yoshikawa (Won PR seat)	78,779	49.79	New
Majority		654	0.42	
Registered electors		267,779		
Turnout			60.45	▼0.24
LDP hold				

=== 2017 ===
2017
Party	Candidate	Votes	%	±%
LDP	Seishirō Etō (Incumbent)	89,944	53.27	▲0.62
Social Democratic	Hajime Yoshikawa (Won PR seat)	70,858	41.97	▲5.53
Happiness Realization	Atsuko Ueda	8,033	4.76	N/A
Majority		19,086	11.30	
Registered electors		285,252		
Turnout			60.69	▲2.65
LDP hold				

=== 2014 ===
2014
Party	Candidate	Votes	%	±%
LDP	Seishirō Etō (Incumbent)	86,363	52.65	▲1.27
Social Democratic	Hajime Yoshikawa (Won PR seat)	59,775	36.44	▲11.05
JCP	Kai Yamashita	17,907	10.92	▲4.95
Majority		26,588	16.21	
Registered electors		290,833		
Turnout			58.04	
LDP hold				

=== 2012 ===
2012
Party	Candidate	Votes	%	±%
LDP	Seishirō Etō	94,666	51.38	▲3.51
Social Democratic	Hajime Yoshikawa (Won PR seat)	46,786	25.39	▼24.70
Restoration	Norihiko Takeuchi	31,779	17.25	New
JCP	Kai Yamashita	11,008	5.97	N/A
Majority		47,880	25.99	
Registered electors				
Turnout				
LDP gain from Social Democratic				

=== 2009 ===
2009
Party	Candidate	Votes	%	±%
Social Democratic	Yasumasa Shigeno	112,090	50.09	▲8.20
LDP	Seishirō Etō (Incumbent) (Won PR seat)	107,124	47.87	▼3.64
Happiness Realization	Etsuko Nagaoka	4,574	2.04	New
Majority		4,966	2.22	
Registered electors				
Turnout				
Social Democratic gain from LDP				

=== 2005 ===
2005
Party	Candidate	Votes	%	±%
LDP	Seishirō Etō (Incumbent)	116,837	51.51	▼4.68
Social Democratic	Yasumasa Shigeno (Won PR seat)	95,017	41.89	▲2.90
JCP	Kai Yamashita	14,957	6.60	▲1.78
Majority		21,820	9.62	
Registered electors				
Turnout				
LDP hold				

=== 2003 ===
2003
Party	Candidate	Votes	%	±%
LDP	Seishirō Etō (Incumbent)	123,434	56.19	▲1.55
Social Democratic	Yasumasa Shigeno	85,666	38.99	▼2.20
JCP	Masaru Ono	10,590	4.82	▲1.84
Majority		37,768	17.20	
Registered electors				
Turnout				
LDP hold				

=== 2000 ===
2000
Party	Candidate	Votes	%	±%
LDP	Seishirō Etō (Incumbent)	92,242	54.64	▼19.54
Social Democratic	Yasumasa Shigeno (Won PR seat)	69,532	41.19	New
JCP	Kenji Bussaka	5,034	2.98	▼7.47
Liberal League	Akemi Ishikawa	2,003	1.19	▼14.18
Majority		22,710	13.45	
Registered electors				
Turnout				
LDP hold				

=== 1996 ===
1996
Party	Candidate	Votes	%	±%
LDP	Seishirō Etō	100,809	74.18	New
Liberal League	Terumi Kamikawa	20,889	15.37	New
JCP	Masami Doi	14,197	10.45	New
Majority		79,920	58.81	
Registered electors				
Turnout				
LDP win (new seat)				
