= Onogawa =

Onogawa may refer to:

- Onogawa Kisaburō, the 5th Yokozuna in sumo
- Kitataiki Akeyoshi, sumo wrestler with the elder name Onogawa
- Ōno River, a river that begins in Ōita Prefecture, Japan
