= Ken Hirose =

Japanese politician

- 広瀬 建
- Official portrait, 2025

Member of the House of Representatives
- Incumbent
- Assumed office 28 October 2024
- Preceded by: Seishirō Etō
- Constituency: Ōita 2nd

Personal details
- Born: 22 January 1974 (age 52) Tokyo, Japan
- Party: Liberal Democratic
- Other political affiliations: Independent (until 2025)
- Parent: Katsusada Hirose (father)
- Relatives: Yoshiro Hayashi (uncle); Yoshimasa Hayashi (cousin)
- Education: Sophia University
- Website: Ken Hirose website

Ken Hirose (広瀬 建, Hirose Ken; born 22 January 1974) is a Japanese politician of the Liberal Democratic Party, who serves as a member of the House of Representatives.

== Early years ==
Born and raised in Tokyo in 1974. After a year of studying in Wisconsin, the United States, he graduated from Tokyo's Fuji High School in March 1993.

In March 1998, he graduated from Sophia University's Faculty of Law and joined Kobe Steel, Ltd. in April. He was consistently engaged in overseas plant business in the engineering division and was engaged in plant development in more than 40 countries. He was stationed in Tehran, Iran, in 2003–2005, Manama, Bahrain, in 2007–2010, and Charlotte, the United States, in 2021–2023, respectively.

== Political career ==
In October 2023, he announced that he would run for Ōita 2nd district in the next general election. He moved to Hita, Oita Prefecture, and left Kobe Steel, Ltd. at the end of October. He sought to gain LDP's nomination.

In the 2024 general election, Hirose ran as an independent because LDP nominated incumbent Seishirō Etō as a candidate. As a result, he defeated CDP's Hajime Yoshikawa and LDP incumbent Etō after a close race.

On 10 January 2025, Hirose applied to join LDP and the apply was approved on the same day.

In the 2025 LDP presidential election, Hirose endorsed Yoshimasa Hayashi as a recommender.

In 2025, Hirose was appointed to Parliamentary Secretary for Agriculture, Forestry and Fisheries in the First Takaichi cabinet.

In the 2026 general election, Hirose defeated CRA's Yoshikawa by a large margin and hold the seat. After the election, he was re-appointed to Parliamentary Secretary for Agriculture, Forestry and Fisheries in the Second Takaichi cabinet.

== Relatives ==
His grandfather is Masao Hirose, a former Minister of Posts and Telecommunications, and his father is Katsusada Hirose, a former governor of Ōita Prefecture. His mother is Yoshiro Hayashi's sister, and Yoshimasa Hayashi was his cousin.

His family consists of a wife and three children.
