= Harajiri Falls =

- 原尻の滝
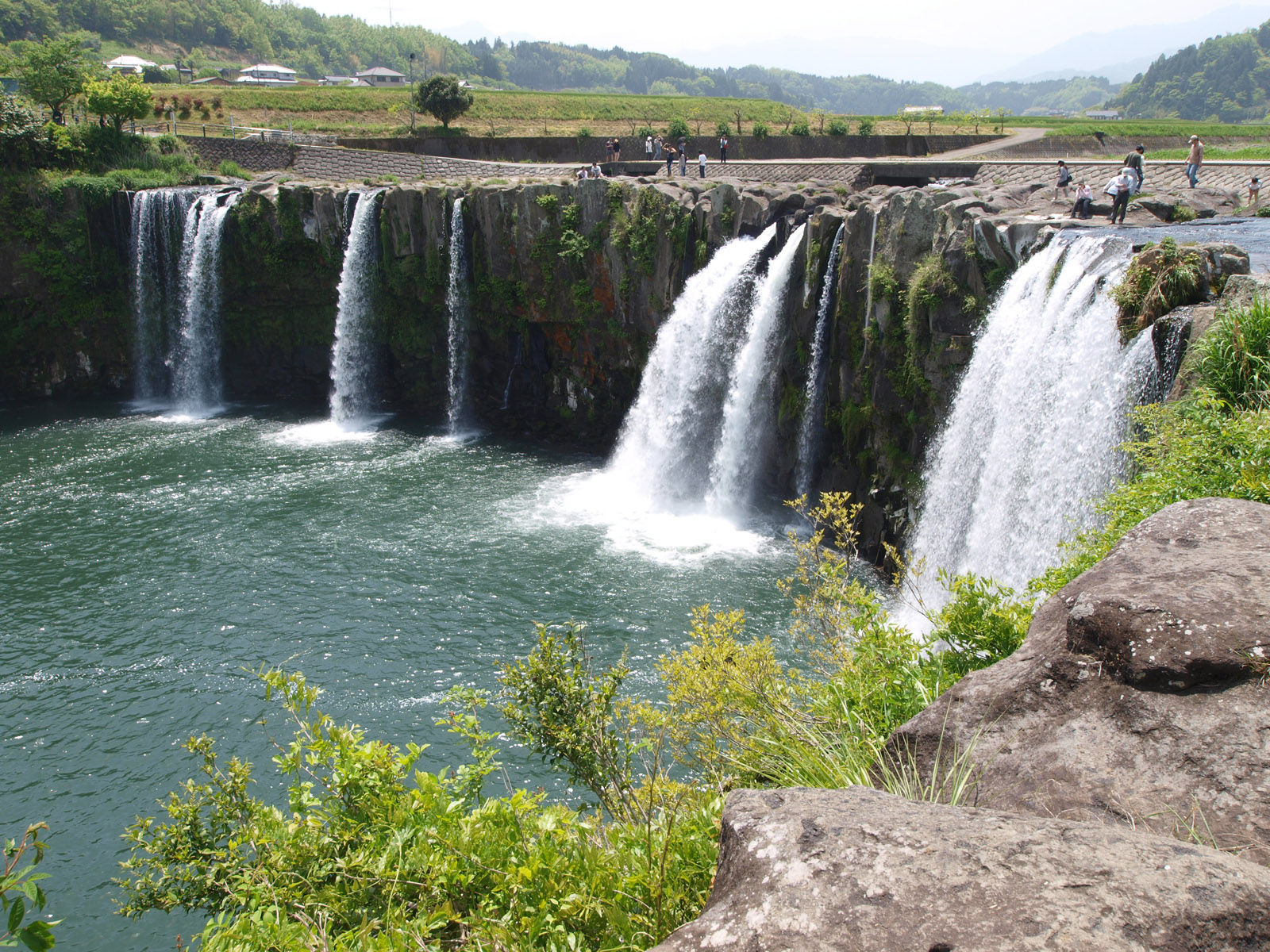
- Interactive map of Harajiri Falls
- Location: Ogata Town, Bungo-Ōno, Ōita Prefecture, Japan
- Coordinates: 32.964333°N 131.451201°E
- Total height: 20 m (66 ft)
- Total width: 120 m (390 ft)
- Watercourse: Ōno River

Harajiri Falls (原尻の滝, Harajiri-no-taki) is a waterfall located on the Ōno River in Ogata Town, Bungo-Ōno, Ōita Prefecture. It was selected by the Japanese Ministry of the Environment as one of the top 100 waterfalls in Japan.

== Features ==
Harajiri Falls is 20 metres (66 ft) tall and 120 metres (390 ft) wide. Due to its appearance, it is sometimes referred to as the "Niagara Falls of the East." The waterfall was formed from the pyroclastic flows of an eruption of Mount Aso about 90,000 years ago.

There is a 90-metre-long (300 ft) wooden pedestrian suspension bridge downstream from the falls which offers a view of the waterfall for visitors.

Located near the falls is a Michi no Eki (roadside station) which sells various local specialties.

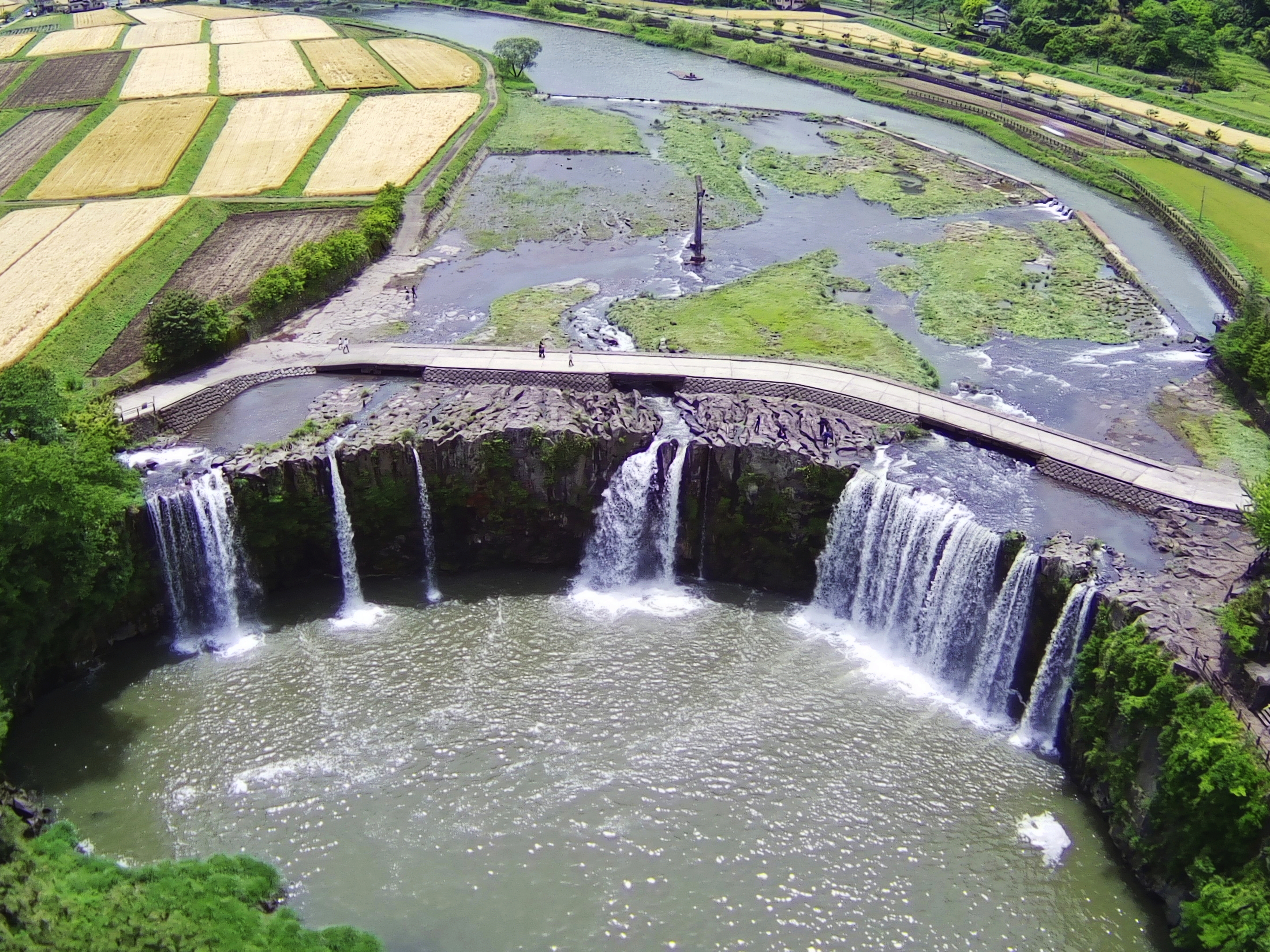
From above

== Festivals and events ==
- The Ogata Tulip Festival (緒方チューリップフェスタ) is held every spring, and visitors come to view the about 500,000 tulips which bloom near the falls.

== See also ==
- List of waterfalls
- List of waterfalls in Japan
