= Ruins =

Remains of human-made architecture

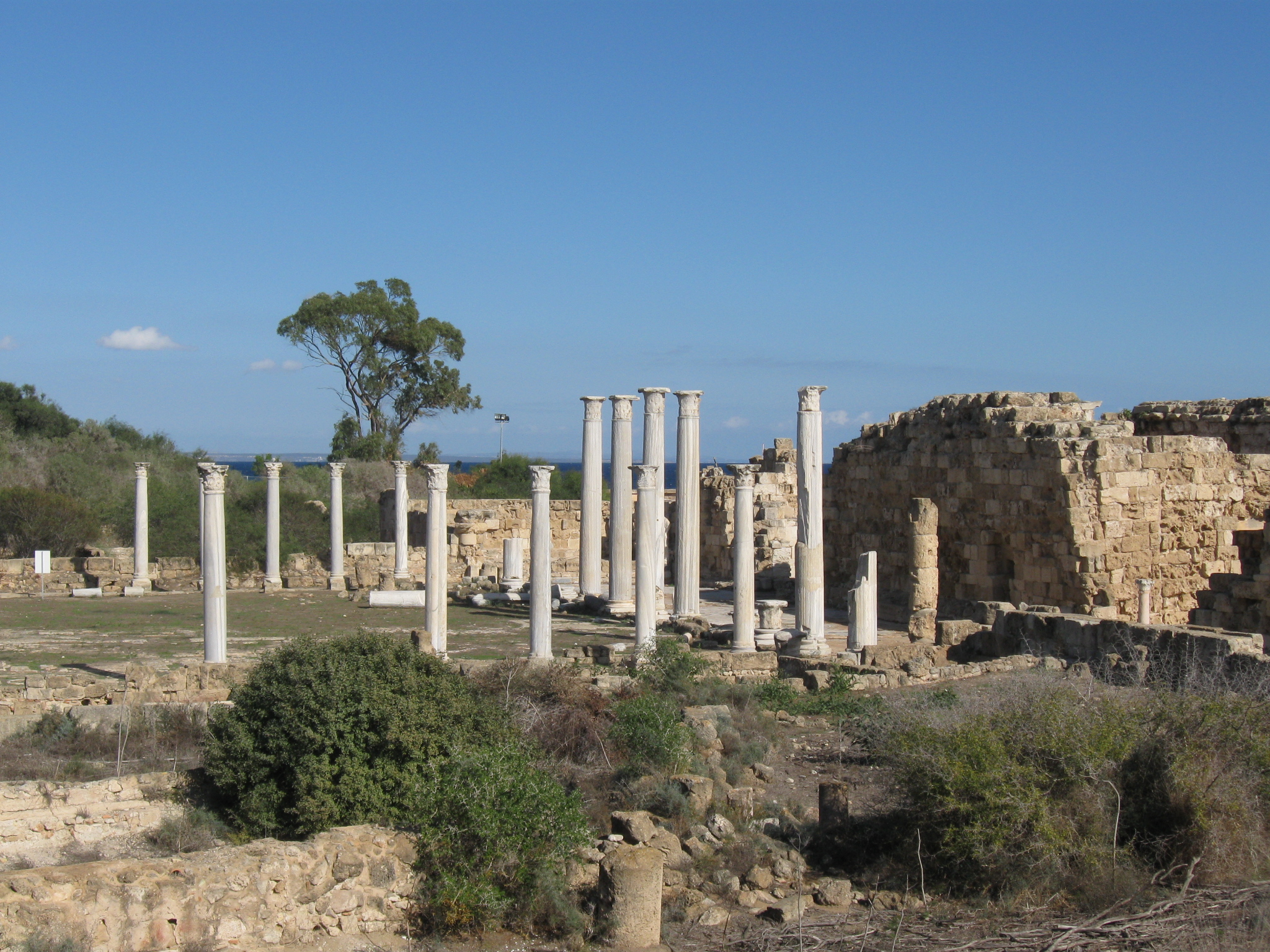
Salamis, Ancient Greek ruins in Cyprus.

Ruins (from Latin ruina 'a collapse') are the remains of a civilization's architecture. The term refers to formerly intact structures that have fallen into a state of partial or total disrepair over time due to a variety of factors, such as lack of maintenance, deliberate destruction by humans, or uncontrollable destruction by natural phenomena. The most common root causes that yield ruins in their wake are natural disasters, armed conflict, and population decline, with many structures becoming progressively derelict over time due to long-term weathering and scavenging.

There are famous ruins all over the world, with notable sites originating from ancient China, the Indus Valley, ancient Iran, ancient Israel and Judea, ancient Iraq, ancient Greece, ancient Egypt, ancient Yemen, Roman, ancient India, sites throughout the Mediterranean Basin, and Incan and Mayan sites in the Americas. Ruins are of great importance to historians, archaeologists and anthropologists, whether they were once individual fortifications, places of worship, ancient universities, houses and utility buildings, or entire villages, towns, and cities. Many ruins have become UNESCO World Heritage Sites in recent years, to identify and preserve them as areas of outstanding value to humanity.

== Cities ==
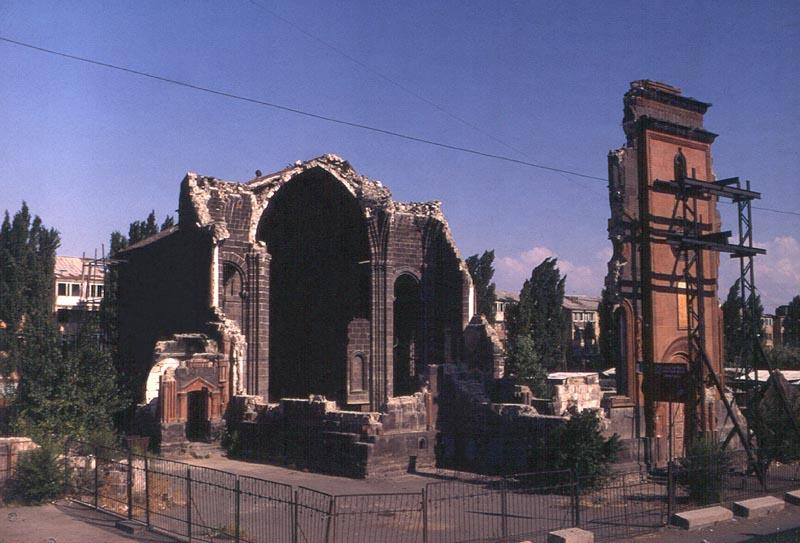
The Holy Saviour's Church in Gyumri after the 1988 Armenian earthquake, the strongest earthquake in the USSR in terms of the number of victims

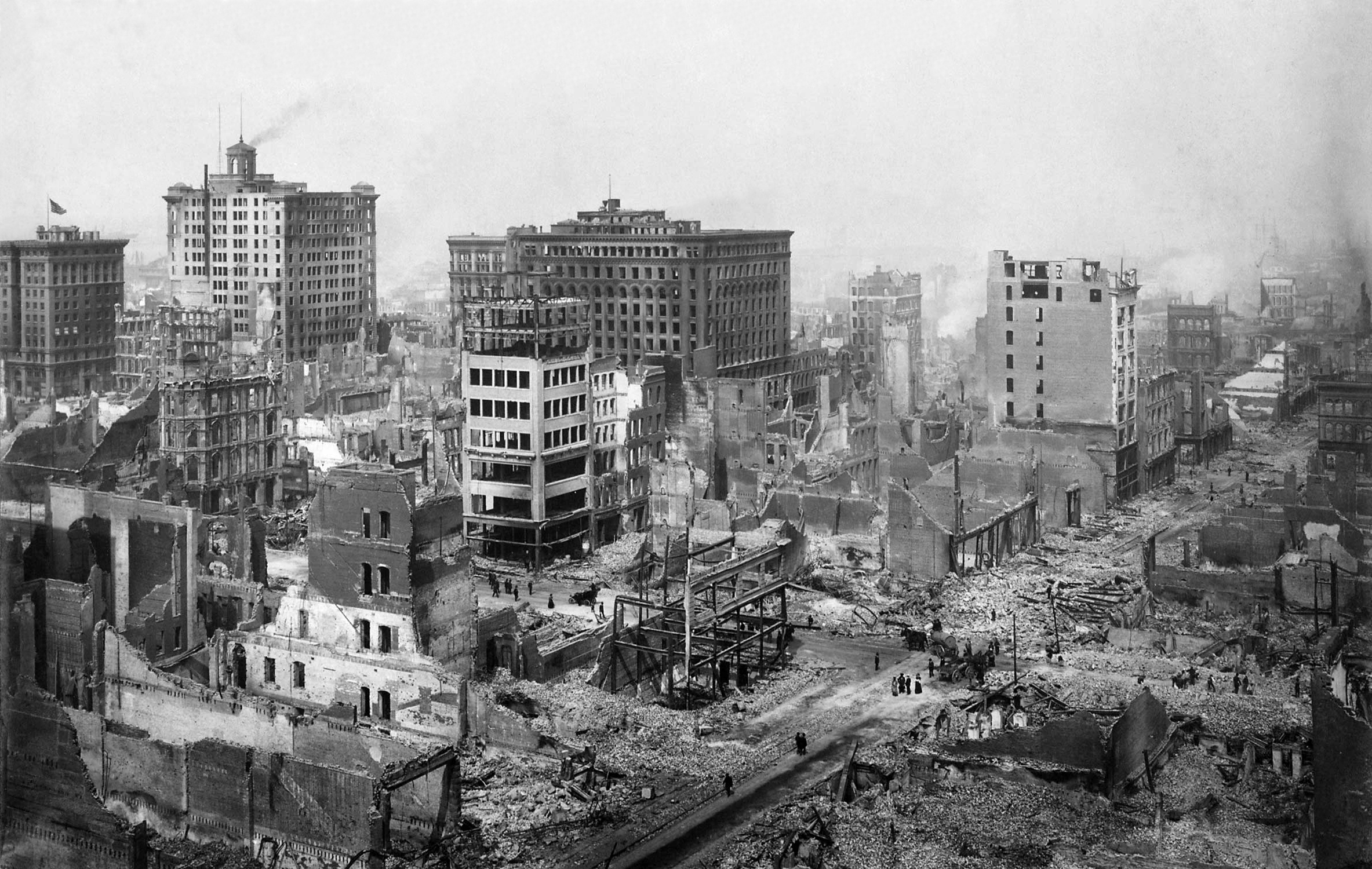
1906 San Francisco earthquake: Ruins in vicinity of Post and Grant Avenue.

Ancient cities were often highly militarized and had fortified defensive settlements. In times of war, they were the central focus of armed conflict and would be sacked and ruined in defeat. For example, Delhi, the capital of India, has been destroyed and ransacked seven to ten times and subsequently rebuilt. Every ruler decided to rebuild the city in their own way -- either overlapping the ruins or next to the ruins. Remnants of the prior cities can still be traced in the layout of modern-day Delhi.

Although less central to modern conflict, vast areas of 20th-century cities such as Warsaw, Dresden, Coventry, Stalingrad, Königsberg, and Berlin were left in ruins following World War II, and a number of major cities around the world – such as Beirut, Kabul, Sarajevo, Grozny, and Baghdad – have been partially or completely ruined in recent years as a result of more localized warfare.

Entire cities have also been ruined, and some occasionally lost completely, to natural disasters. The ancient Roman city of Pompeii in modern-day Italy was completely destroyed during a volcanic eruption in the 1st century CE, and its uncovered ruins are now preserved as a World Heritage Site. The city of Lisbon in Portugal was also completely destroyed in 1755 by a massive earthquake and tsunami; and the 1906 San Francisco earthquake in the United States had left the city in almost complete ruin.

== Deliberate destruction ==
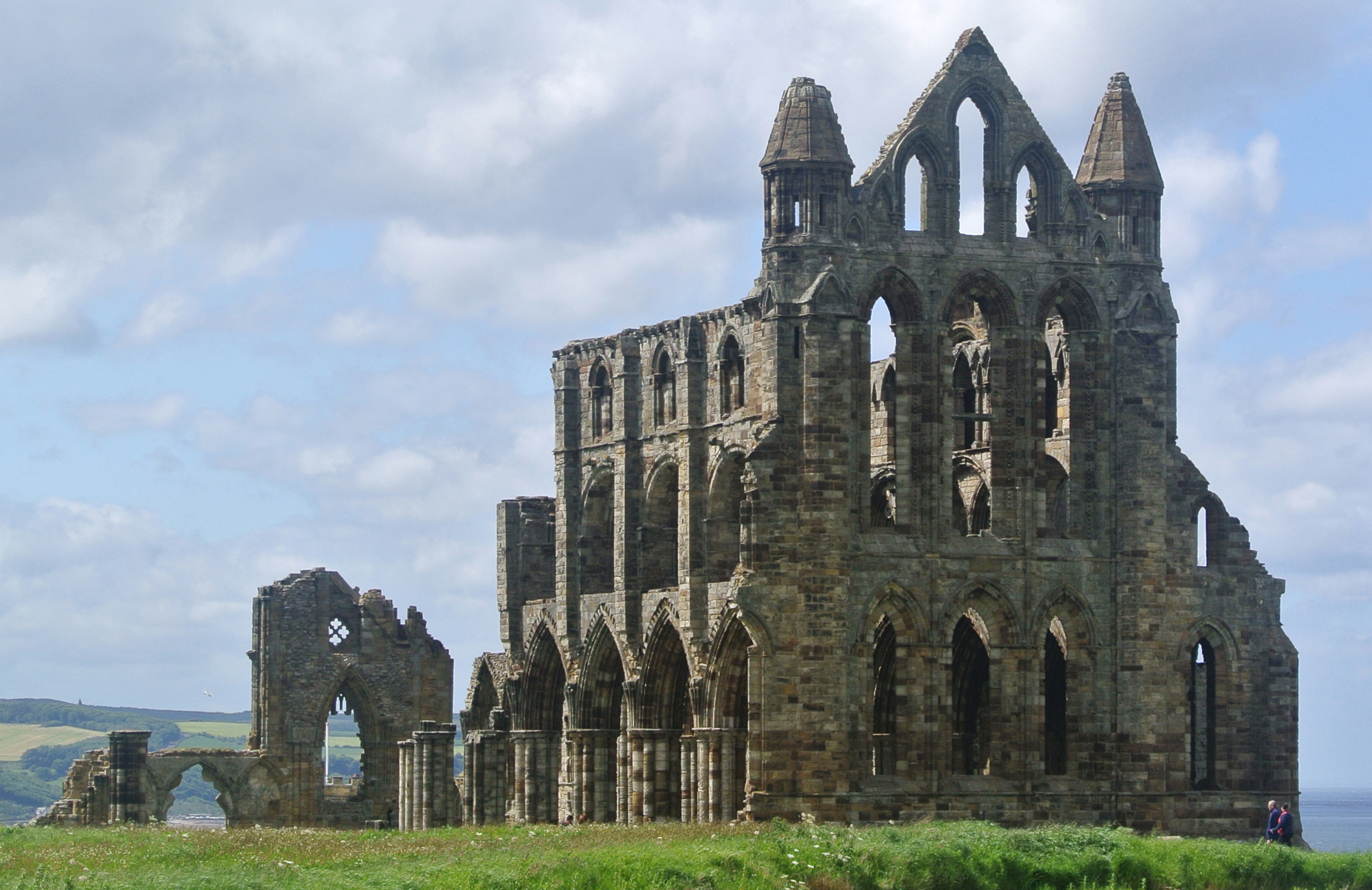
Ruins of Whitby Abbey, England

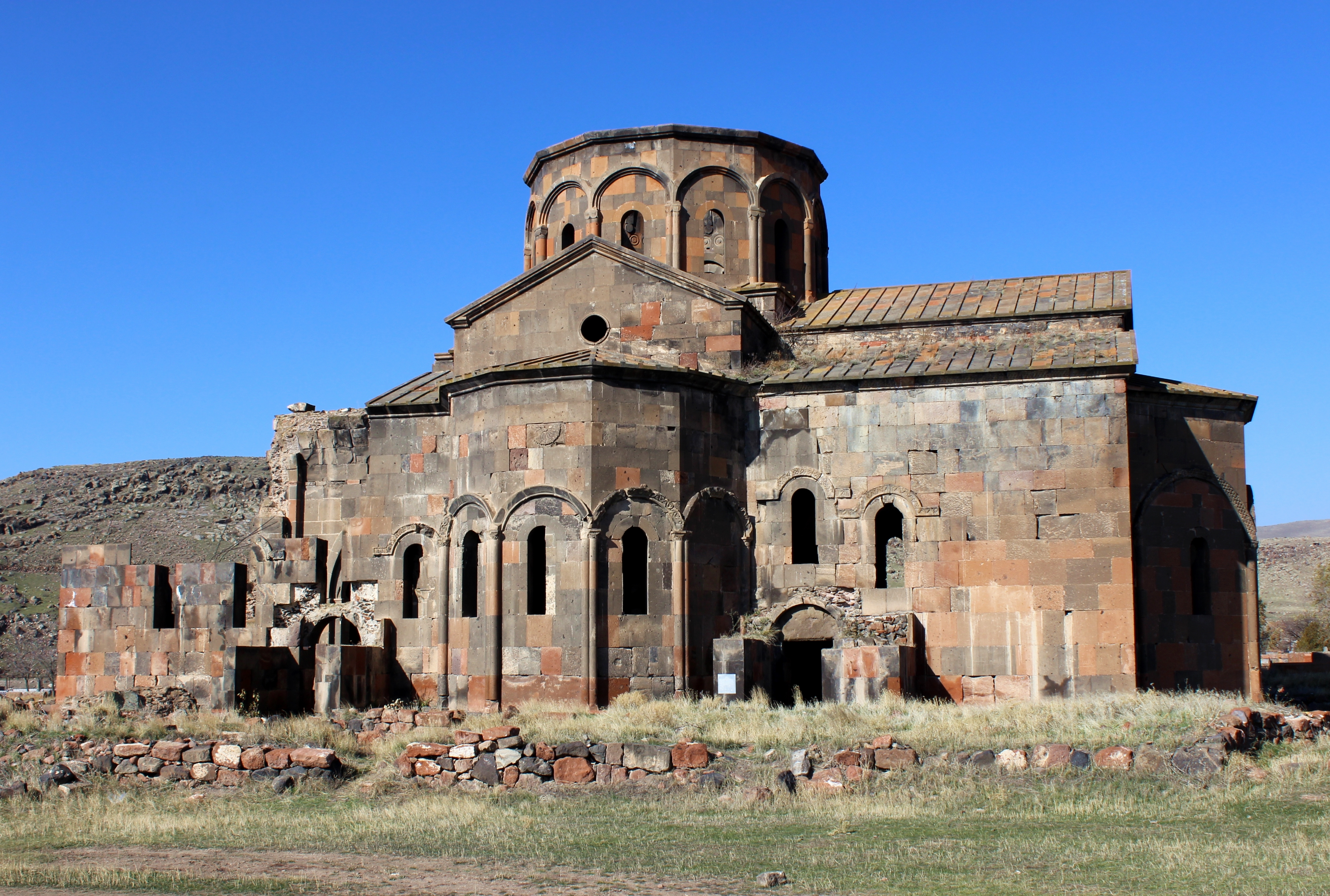
The 7th-century Cathedral in Talin

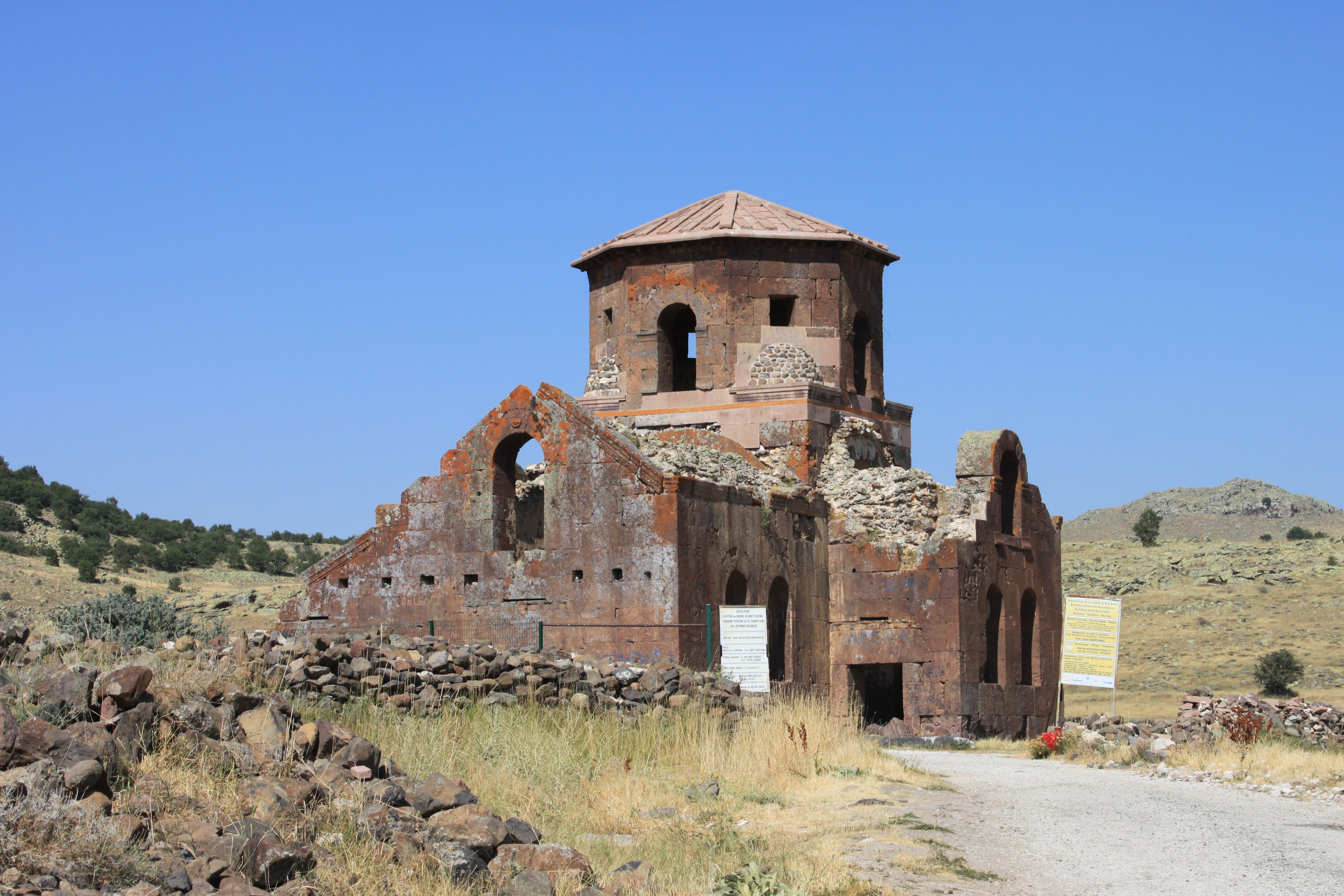
Ruins of Kızıl Kilise, "Red Church" in Güzelyurt

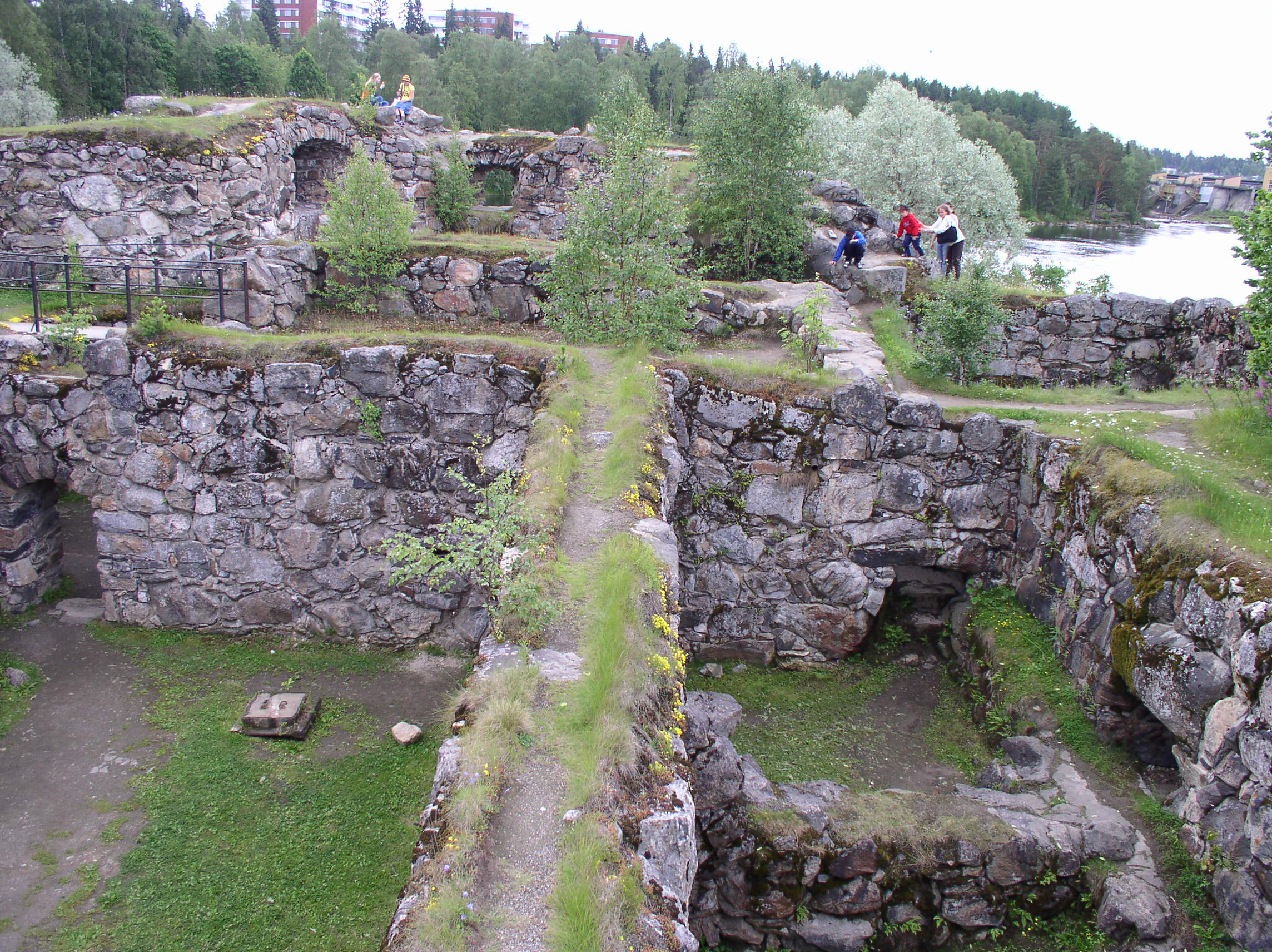
Ruins of Kajaani Castle in Kajaani, Finland

Apart from acts of war, some important historic buildings have fallen victim to deliberate acts of destruction as a consequence of social, political and economic factors. The spoliation of public monuments in Rome was under way during the fourth century, when it was covered in protective legislation in the Theodosian Code and in new legislation of Majorian. The dismantling increased once popes were free of imperial restrictions. Marble was still being burned for agricultural lime in the Roman Campagna into the nineteenth century.

In Europe, many religious buildings suffered as a result of the politics of the day. In the 16th century, the English monarch Henry VIII set about confiscating the property of monastic institutions in a campaign which became known as the Dissolution of the Monasteries. Many abbeys and monasteries fell into ruin when their assets, including lead roofs, were stripped.

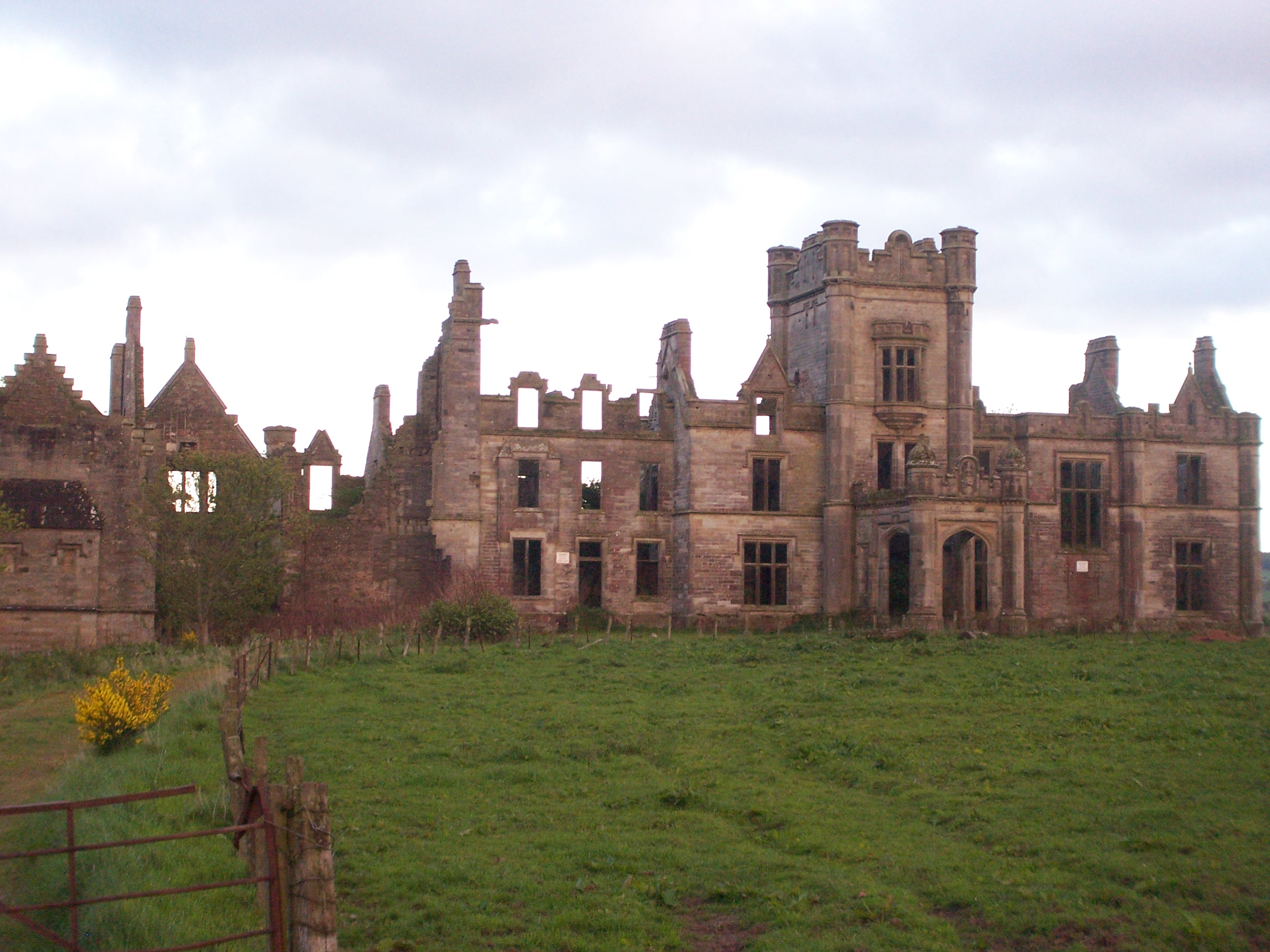
Ury House, Aberdeenshire ruined by removal of the roof after the Second World War to avoid taxation.

In the 20th century, a number of European historic buildings fell into ruin as a result of taxation policies, which required all structures with roofs to pay substantial property tax. The owners of these buildings, like Fetteresso Castle (now restored) and Slains Castle in Scotland, deliberately destroyed their roofs in protest at, and defiance of, the new taxes. Other decrees of government have had a more direct result, such as the case of Beverston Castle, in which the English parliament ordered significant destruction of the castle to prevent it being used by opposition Royalists. Ireland has encouraged the ruin of grand Georgian houses, seen as symbols of Britain. (Note: A selection chosen for their picturesque value, appear in Simon Marsden (photos), Duncan McLaren (text), In Ruins: The Once Great Houses of Ireland, 1980, expanded ed. 1997.)

== Relics of steel and wooden towers ==
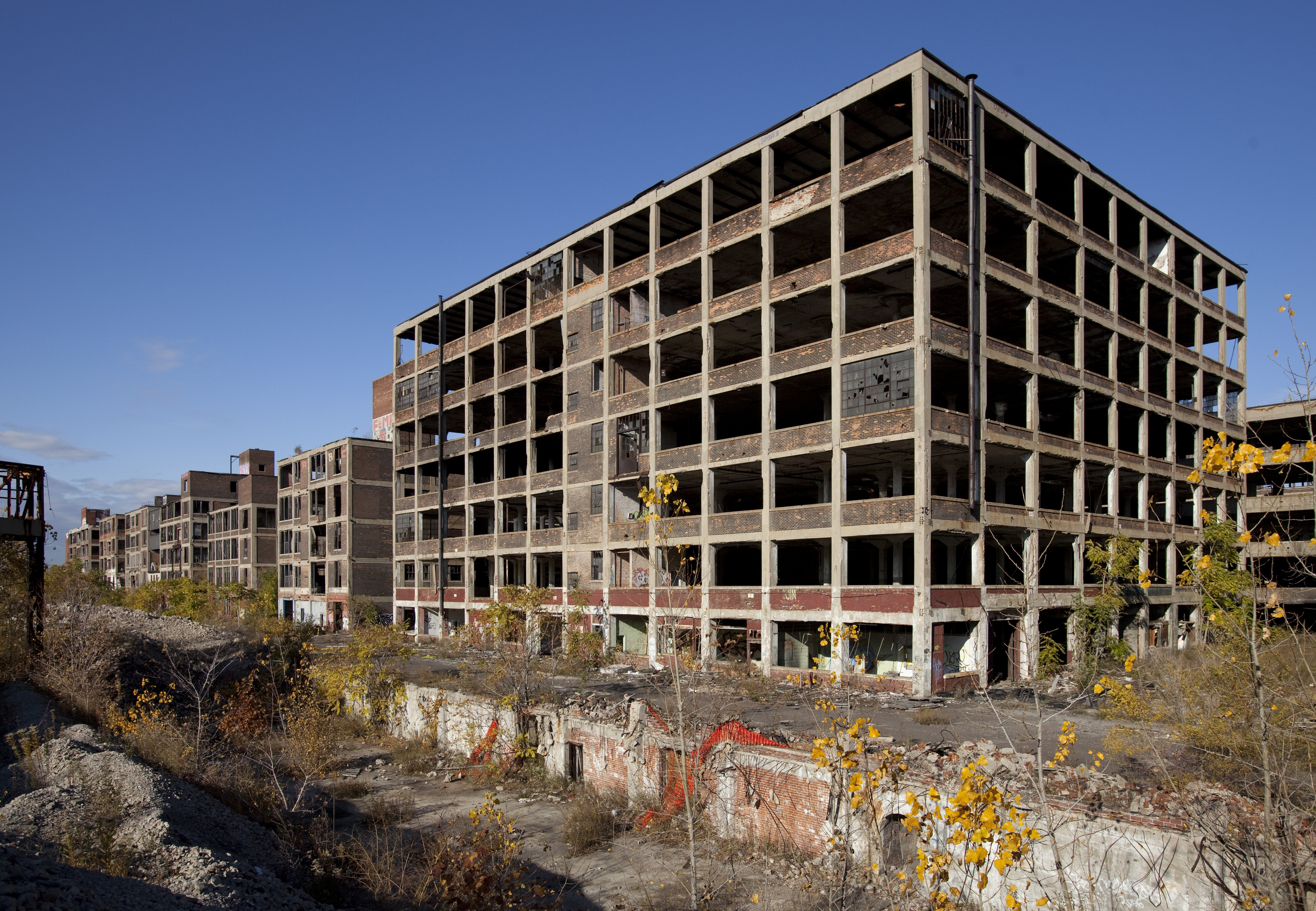
Rust Belt ruins of former factory, Detroit, Michigan

As a rule, towers built of steel are dismantled, when not used any more, because their construction can be either rebuilt on a new site or if the state of construction does not allow a direct reuse, the metal can be recycled economically. However, sometimes tower basements remain, because their removal can be expensive. One example of such a basement is the basement of the former radio mast of Deutschlandsender Herzberg/Elster.

The basements of large wooden towers such as Transmitter Ismaning may also be left behind, because removing them would be difficult.

The contemplation of "rust belt" post-industrial ruins is in its infancy.

== Aesthetics ==
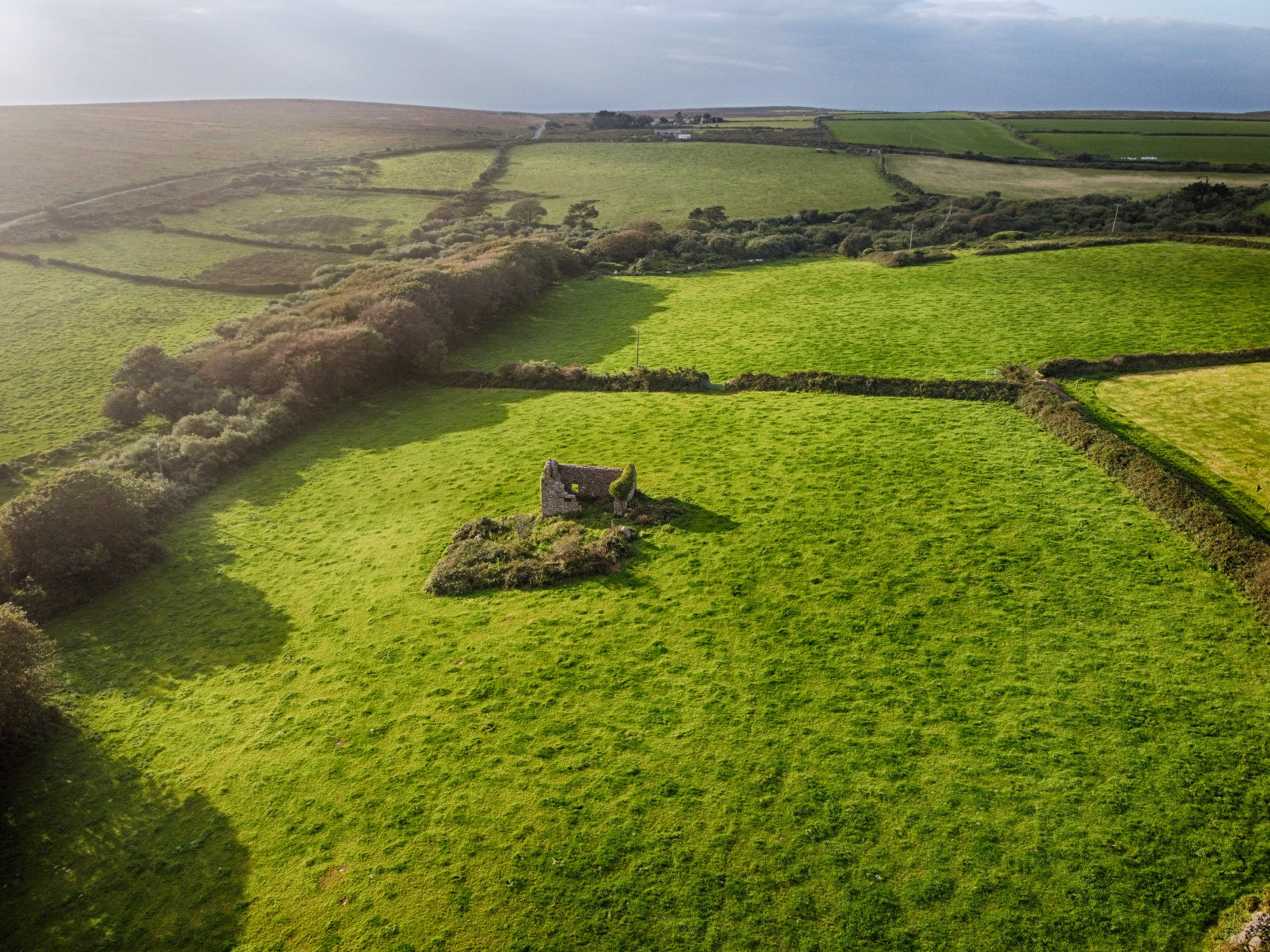
In modern times, ruins such as these are sought after for their aesthetics

In the Middle Ages Roman ruins were inconvenient impediments to modern life, quarries for pre-shaped blocks for building projects, or marble to be burnt for agricultural lime, and subjects for satisfying commentaries on the triumph of Christianity and the general sense of the world's decay, in what was assumed to be its last age, before the Second Coming. With the Renaissance, ruins took on new roles among a cultural elite, as examples for a consciously revived and purified architecture all' antica, and for a new aesthetic appreciation of their innate beauty as objects of venerable decay. The chance discovery of Nero's Domus Aurea at the turn of the sixteenth century, and the early excavations at Herculaneum and Pompeii had marked effects on current architectural styles, in Raphael's Rooms at the Vatican and in neoclassical interiors, respectively. The new sense of historicism that accompanied neoclassicism led some artists and designers to conceive of the modern classicising monuments of their own day as they would one day appear as ruins.

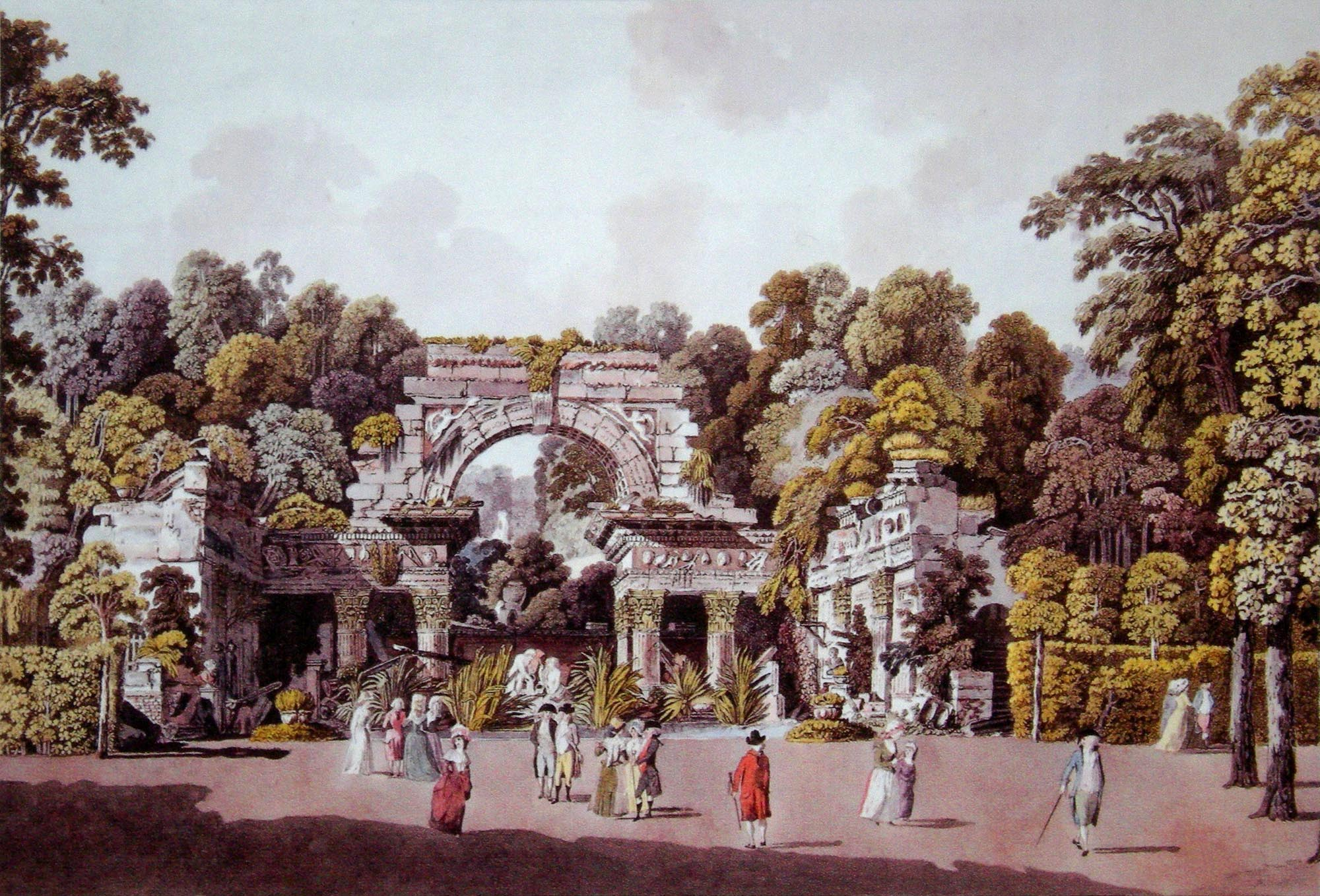
Ruins made-to-measure: the "Roman Ruin" in the park at Schönbrunn, c 1800

In the period of Romanticism ruins (mostly of castles) were frequent object for painters, place of meetings of romantic poets, nationalist students etc. (e.g. Bezděz Castle in Bohemia, Hambach Castle in Germany, Devin Castle in Slovakia).

Ruin value (German: Ruinenwert) is the concept that a building be designed such that if it eventually collapsed, it would leave behind aesthetically pleasing ruins that would last far longer without any maintenance at all. Joseph Michael Gandy completed for Sir John Soane in 1832 an atmospheric watercolor of the architect's vast Bank of England rotunda as a picturesquely overgrown ruin, that is an icon of Romanticism. Ruinenwert was popularized in the 20th century by Albert Speer while planning for the 1936 Summer Olympics and published as Die Ruinenwerttheorie ("The Theory of Ruin Value").

Ruins remain a popular subject for painting and creative photography and are often romanticized in film and literature, providing scenic backdrops or used as metaphors for other forms of decline or decay. For example, the ruins of Dunstanburgh Castle in England inspired Turner to create several paintings; in 1989 the ruined Dunnottar Castle in Scotland was used for filming of Hamlet. The Japanese band Ruins often depicts south-eastern ruins, such as magaibutsu, although not strictly implemented in the discography.

== See also ==
- Modern ruins
- Dissolution of the monasteries
- Ephemerality
- Folly, for garden ruins
- Ghost town
- Ozymandias, an English poem about ruins
- Romanticism
- Shipwreck
- Slighting
