= Mie, Ōita =

Dissolved municipality in Ōita prefecture, Japan

Mie (三重町, Mie-machi) was a town located in Ōno District, Ōita Prefecture, Japan.

As of 2003, the town had an estimated population of 18,241 and the density of 112.48 persons per km^{2}. The total area was 162.17 km^{2}.

On March 31, 2005, Mie, along with the towns of Asaji, Inukai, Ogata and Ōno, and the villages of Chitose and Kiyokawa (all from Ōno District), was merged to create the city of Bungo-Ōno.
