= Chitose, Ōita =

Village in Ōita Prefecture, Japan

Chitose (千歳村, Chitose-mura) was a village located in Ōno District, Ōita Prefecture, Japan.

As of 2003, the village had an estimated population of 2,468 and the density of 115.17 persons per km^{2}. The total area was 21.43 km^{2}.

On March 31, 2005, Chitose, along with the towns of Asaji, Inukai, Mie, Ogata and Ōno, and the village of Kiyokawa (all from Ōno District), was merged to create the city of Bungo-Ōno.
