= Inukai Stone Buddhas =

Group of Japanese Buddhist statues

- 犬飼石仏 (Japanese)
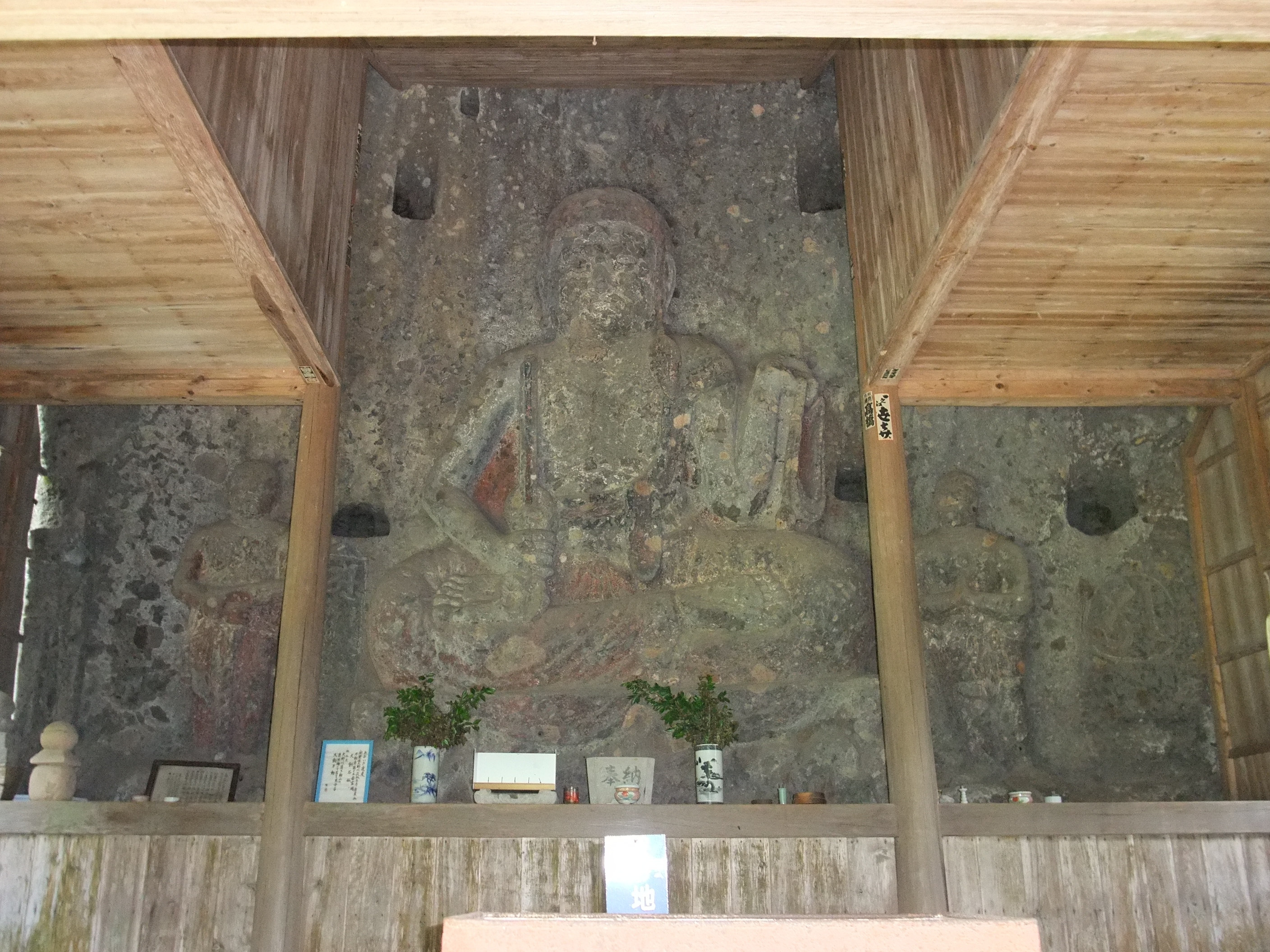
- Inukai Stone Buddhas

- Inukai Stone Buddhas Inukai Stone Buddhas (Japan)
- Interactive map of Inukai Stone Buddhas
- 33°3′11.25″N 131°37′54.67″E
- Periods: Kamakura period
- Location: Bungo-Ōno, Ōita Prefecture, Japan
- Region: Kyushu

Site notes
- Public access: Yes

The Inukai Stone Buddhas (犬飼石仏, Inukai sekibutsu) is a group of religious statues carved in bas-relief into a tuff cliff in Inukai neighborhood of the city of Bungo-Ōno, Ōita Prefecture on the island of Kyushu, Japan. The site was designated a National Historic Site of Japan in 1934.

== Overview ==
Constructing Buddha statues out of stone is widely practiced in Buddhist areas in Asia. These images can be divided into three broad types: Magaibutsu (磨崖仏), bas-relief images carved directly into a cliff face, movable independent stone Buddhas carved from cut stone, and cave Buddhas carved inside rock caves, The Inukai images can be classed as Magaibutsu.

The Inukai image are carved into a 20-meter high tuff rock wall near the Õno River. The main image is a kneeling image of Fudō Myōō, 3.76 meters high, carved in half-relief. The image has both eyes open, holding a sword in his right hand, and his left hand bending upwards and holding a rope. The statue retains slight traces of vermilion coloring. This image is accompanied by a 1.7 meter standing statue of Kongara Dōji on the right, and a 1.73 meter standing statue of Seitaka Dōji on the left. The images were carved in the Kamakura period. On the rock wall above Fudō Myōō are the words "Ryudenzan", perhaps indicating the existence of a temple in the past. The words Namu Daishi Hensho Kongo are engraved on the side. Hensho Kongo refers to Kūkai, the founder of the Shingon sect of Esoteric Buddhism. The writing on the rock wall is also a sutra advocating devotion to Kūkai.

The site is approximately 35 minutes walk from Inukai Station on the JR Kyushu Hōhi Main Line.

== See also ==
- List of Historic Sites of Japan (Ōita)
