= Hakusui Dam =

Coordinates: 32°54′18.78″N 131°19′37.64″E

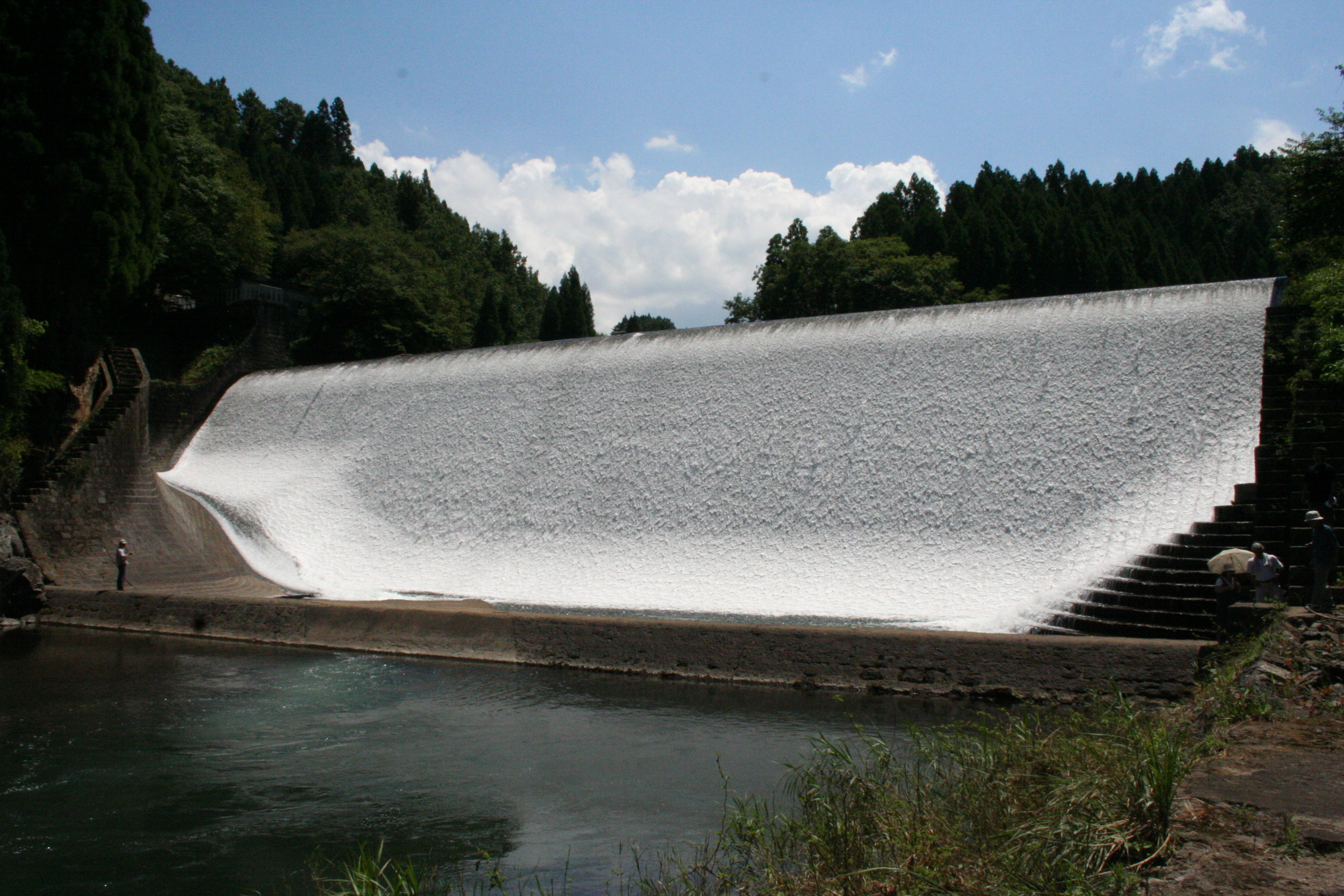
- Hakusui Dam
- Interactive map of Hakusui Dam
- Location: Taketa, Ōita Prefecture, Japan
- Purpose: Irrigation
- Status: Operational
- Construction began: 1934
- Opening date: 1938

Dam and spillways
- Type of dam: Concrete gravity dam (stone masonry-faced)
- Height: 14 metres (46 ft)
- Length: 86 metres (282 ft)
- Width (crest): 6 metres (20 ft)
- Website; MLIT: Hakusui Dam

Hakusui Dam (白水ダム) is a stone masonry-faced concrete gravity dam on the upper reaches of the Ōno River in Taketa, Ōita Prefecture, Japan. Completed in 1938, the dam spans 86 m and stands 14 m tall. Designed by civil engineer Yasuo Ono (小野康夫) for irrigation purposes, it features a distinctive curved and stepped spillway that controls water flow and prevents erosion.

Widely praised by Japanese civil engineering societies for its aesthetic design, the dam is sometimes called "Japan's most beautiful dam" or "the Lady of Dams." Designated as an Important Cultural Property in 1999, it represents an important example of pre-war concrete dam technology that successfully combines functional engineering with aesthetic consideration.

Built during Japan's agricultural modernization in the early 20th century, Hakusui Dam exemplifies the development of small-scale irrigation dams crucial to supporting farmland and rural infrastructure. Unlike large-scale hydroelectric or flood control projects, it serves exclusively for irrigation and continues to provide a reliable water supply for agricultural use in the Taketa region.

== Background ==
=== Planning and development ===
The Hakusui Dam was constructed to address irrigation shortages and erosion issues in the Taketa area. Prior to its construction, erosion had caused local rivers to flow in ravines from which it was difficult to draw water, and farmers had to undertake the arduous task of maintaining irrigation canals between the rivers' distant upper reaches and their fields. The dam was planned by agricultural improvement organizations, including the Fuji-Oi Irrigation Land Improvement Association (富士緒井路耕地整理組合), as part of Japan's agricultural modernization infrastructure development during the early 20th century. The project represented the construction of small-scale irrigation dams that were crucial to supporting farmland and rural infrastructure, distinct from large-scale hydroelectric or flood control projects. Contemporary newspaper coverage documented the planning and construction process throughout the 1930s.

=== Design and preparation ===
The dam was designed by civil engineer Yasuo Ono (小野康夫) of Oita Prefecture, who created an extensive photographic record of the construction process. Ono's design incorporated both functional requirements for irrigation and aesthetic considerations, resulting in the distinctive curved and stepped spillway that has become the dam's hallmark feature.

== Construction ==
=== Labor and workforce ===
Construction of the Hakusui Dam began in 1934 and was completed in 1938. The project involved skilled masons who processed the local tuff stone and water suppliers who contributed to the construction effort. Local history accounts document community involvement in the planning and construction process, including farmers' campaigns for the irrigation project and land readjustment efforts.

=== Foundation and materials ===
The dam was built using tuff stone from local quarries, which was cut and assembled using traditional stone-masonry techniques, combined with concrete for structural support. Engineering calculations and structural design considerations were specifically adapted to the challenging local geology, which includes fragile volcanic materials associated with the Aso volcanic region and local tuff deposits, requiring careful attention to erosion control and stability.

=== Completion ===
The dam was completed in 1938, marking the successful implementation of Ono's innovative design that combined functional irrigation requirements with aesthetic considerations. The extensive photographic documentation, totaling 123 construction photographs, provides a valuable historical record of the construction process from foundation work through final completion.

== Structure ==
The Hakusui Dam is a stone-masonry-faced concrete gravity dam with a height of 14 m and a length of 86 m. The structure consists of a concrete core with an external facing of cut tuff stone, creating both structural strength and visual harmony with the surrounding landscape. The tuff stone was sourced from local quarries and processed using traditional stone-masonry techniques, combined with concrete for structural support.

=== Spillway design ===
Its distinctive design features a curved and stepped spillway geometry that serves both functional and aesthetic purposes. The water flow is turned 90 degrees with stepped configurations on the right side of the levee and curved profiles on the left, designed to slow water velocity and prevent downstream erosion of the fragile ground. The stepped configuration was specifically chosen to control water flow velocity and minimize downstream erosion, while the curved profile enhances the structure's visual appeal. As the water flows over the center of the structure, it appears white—hence the name Hakusui, or "white water." The dam functions as an overtopping spillway, allowing water to flow directly over its crest during periods of high water. The dam's form combines practical water management functions with visual appeal, contributing to its recognition as one of Japan's most aesthetically notable dams.

== Operation ==
The Hakusui Dam is used exclusively for irrigation purposes and does not generate hydroelectric power. It was built to provide a reliable water supply for agricultural use in the Taketa region, addressing the irrigation shortages that had previously affected local farming operations. The dam creates a reservoir that stores water from the Ōno River, which is then distributed for irrigation through canals and ditches to surrounding agricultural lands.

The dam's operation focuses on water storage and controlled release for irrigation needs. As an overtopping spillway dam, it allows excess water to flow directly over its crest during periods of high flow, while maintaining sufficient storage for agricultural requirements. The structure continues to function in its original capacity for water management and irrigation support, serving as a vital component of the region's agricultural infrastructure.

== Cultural heritage ==
In 1999, the Hakusui Dam was designated as an Important Cultural Property by the Agency for Cultural Affairs. This designation recognizes both the dam's engineering significance as an example of pre-war concrete dam technology and its aesthetic value within Japan's agricultural civil engineering heritage. The structure is recognized in civil engineering and landscape architecture circles as an important example of how functional infrastructure can achieve aesthetic excellence through careful design consideration. As an Important Cultural Property, the dam is subject to preservation standards that protect its historical integrity while allowing continued operation for irrigation purposes. Conservation efforts focus on maintaining the stone masonry facing and ensuring the structural stability of this significant piece of Japan's industrial heritage.

== Tourism and access ==
Hakusui Dam has become a popular tourist destination, renowned for its scenic rural setting and unique water flow characteristics. Visitors are particularly drawn to the dam during the autumn foliage season, when the surrounding landscape enhances its visual appeal. The structure's aesthetic qualities and distinctive patterns created by water flowing over its curved and stepped spillway make it a notable attraction in the Taketa area.

Located about 30 minutes by car from central Taketa, the dam cannot be reached by public transport. Access is typically by private vehicle, with viewing areas available to observe the dam's unique water flow patterns. Its remote location and natural setting contribute to its appeal as a peaceful destination for nature and architecture enthusiasts.

== Significance ==
Hakusui Dam represents an important example of early 20th-century Japanese civil engineering in agricultural water management. Unlike large-scale hydroelectric or flood control dams, it exemplifies the development of smaller irrigation dams crucial to Japan's agricultural modernization. The dam demonstrates pre-war concrete dam technology adapted for agricultural needs, with exceptional attention to both functional requirements and aesthetic design. Its successful combination of engineering utility and visual appeal has earned recognition as both a working infrastructure project and a cultural heritage site within Japan's agricultural civil engineering tradition.

== See also ==
- List of dams in Japan
- Important Cultural Properties of Japan
- Ōno River
- Taketa, Ōita
