= Inazumi Underwater Cave =

Underwater cave in Japan

Coordinates: 32.9008°N 131.5434°E

Inazumi Underwater Cave (稲積水中鍾乳洞, Inadzumi-Suichūshōnyūdō) is an underwater limestone cave located in Bungo-Ōno, Ōita Prefecture, Japan. It is the longest underwater cave system in Japan.

== Overview ==
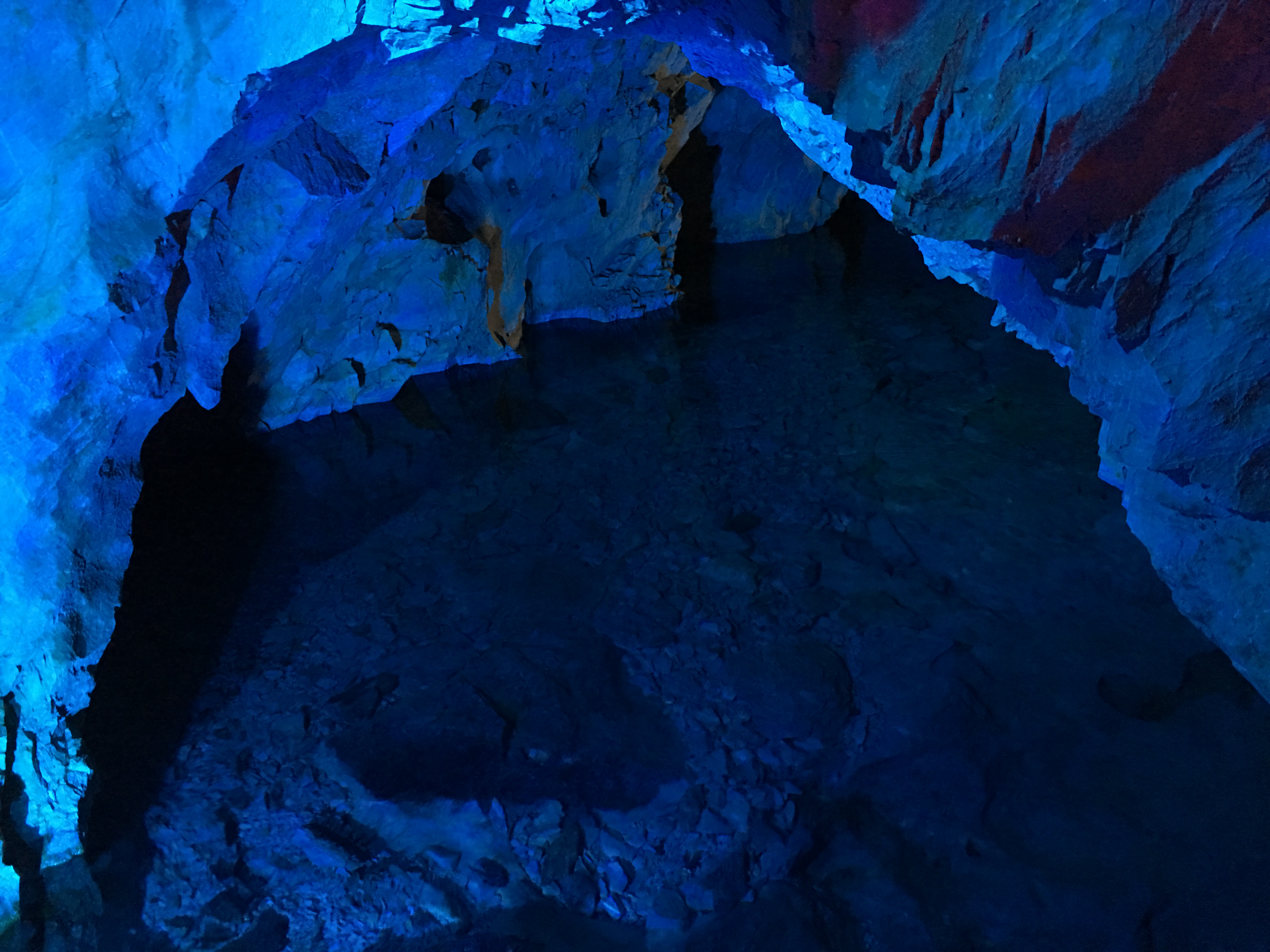
Interior of the cave illuminated with blue light

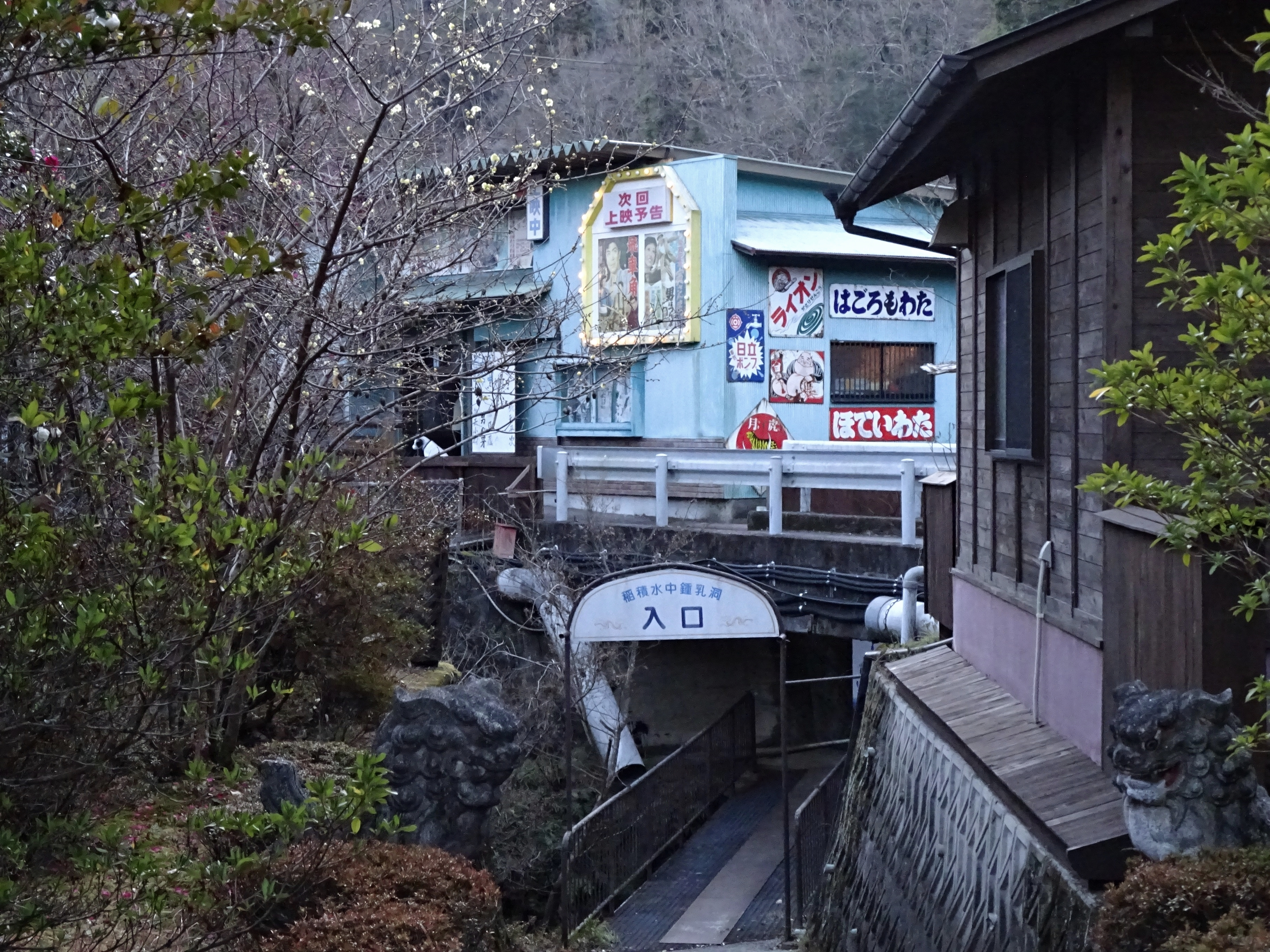
Entrance to the cave

The existence of the cave has been known since the Edo period, but it was not until 1976 that a team of divers first surveyed the cave system. In 2014, an additional 300-meter-long section of the cave was discovered, bringing the total surveyed length to 1,000 meters and making it the longest underwater cave system in Japan. Surveys are still ongoing as of 2025.

The cave was later developed into a tourist facility, allowing visitors to explore the dry sections of the cave on foot. About 70 meters from the entrance, the cave splits into two sections, Suichu Cave (水中洞) and Shinsei Cave (新生洞). The two sections were originally separated, but were connected with artificial passages for tourism. Both cave sections continue for about 300 meters from the mouth of the cave. The tourist section of the cave offers views of unique geological features such as bell holes, coral stones, underwater stalactites, stalagmites, and fissures more than 40 meters deep in some places.

The interior of the cave maintains a temperature 16°C (about 61°F) year round.

== Geology ==
The limestone cave now known as Inazumi Underwater Cave was formed about 300 million years ago during the Paleozoic era, but it was originally not submerged. A major eruption of Mount Aso about 90,000 years ago caused all drain outlets to be blocked by pyroclastic flows, flooding the cave. The pyroclastic flow deposits were eventually eroded by the nearby Hakusan River (白山川), lowering the water level of the cave and exposing the upper section to air.

== Tourism ==
Inazumi Underwater Cave is a show cave. Visitors are able to explore hundreds of meters of the cave, parts of which are illuminated with blue LED lights.

In 2021, rentable tent saunas were made available. Users are encouraged to cool off in the cave water after exiting the sauna.

Reservations can be made for snorkeling and cave diving in the cave.

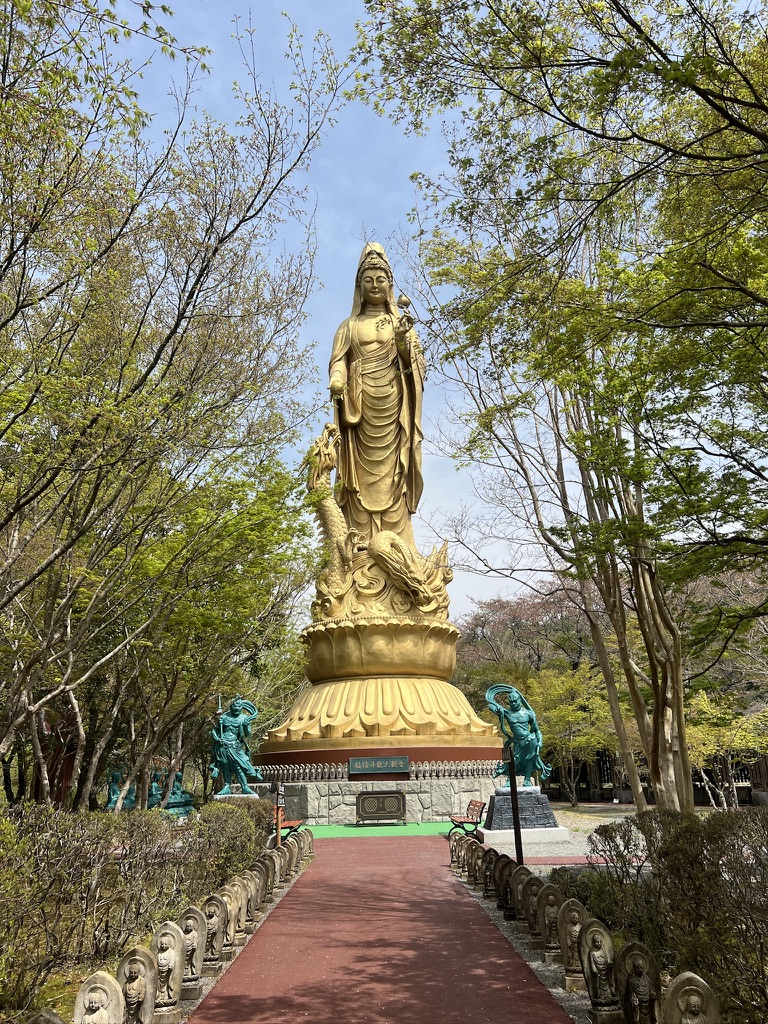
Kannon statue near Inazumi Underwater Cave

Near the cave is a tall, gold-colored statue of the bodhisattva Kannon. It is said to be the tallest statue in Ōita Prefecture.
