= Ogatamiyasako East Stone Buddhas =

Group of Japanese Buddhist statues

- 緒方宮迫東石仏 (Japanese)
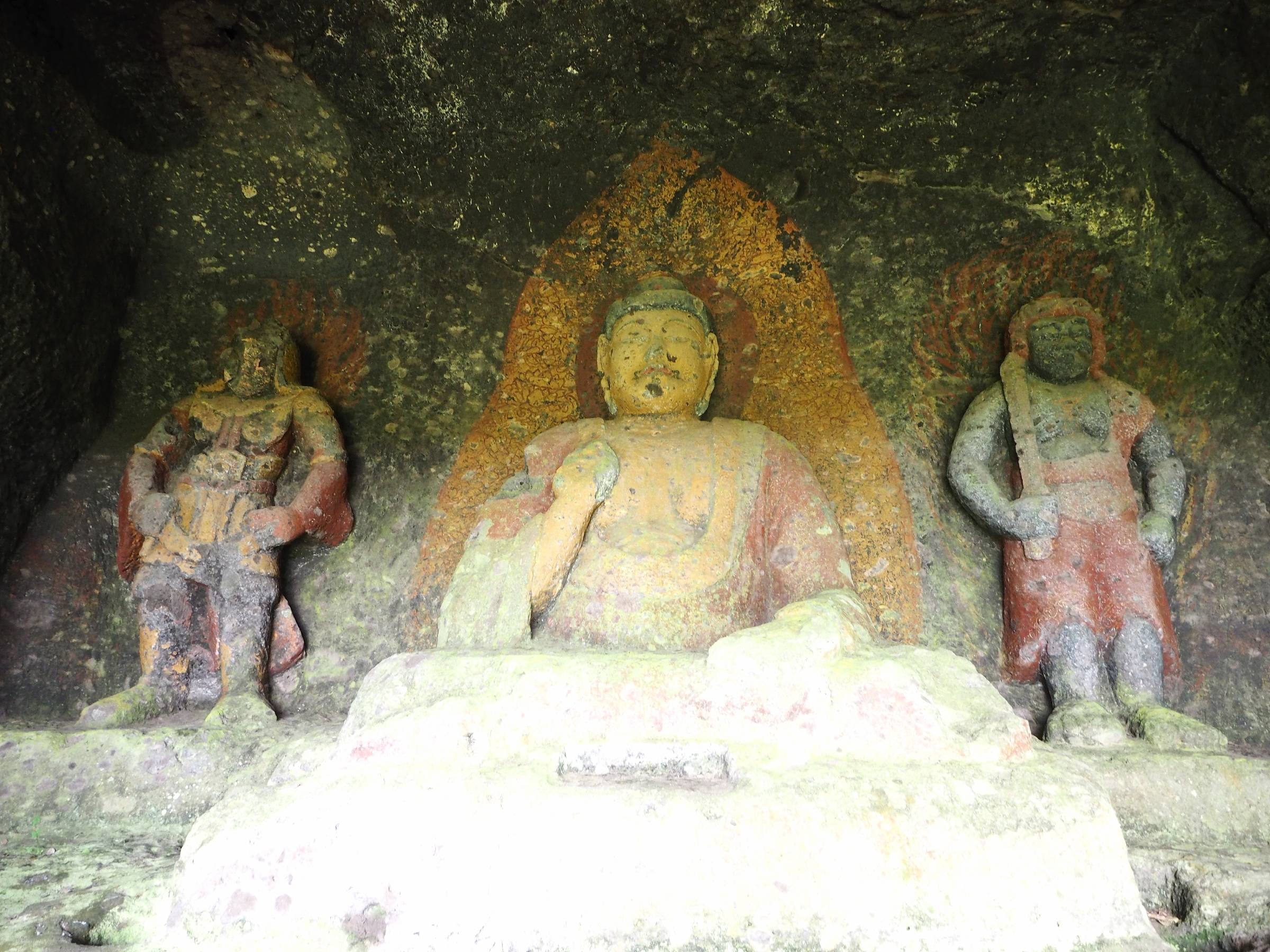
- Ogatamiyasako East Stone Buddhas

- Ogatamiyasako East Stone Buddhas Ogatamiyasako East Stone Buddhas (Japan)
- Interactive map of Ogatamiyasako East Stone Buddhas
- 32°57′48.3″N 131°27′30.8″E
- Periods: Heian - Kamakura period
- Location: Bungo-Ōno, Ōita Prefecture, Japan
- Region: Kyushu

Site notes
- Public access: Yes

The Ogatamiyasako East Stone Buddhas (緒方宮迫東石仏, Ogatamiyasako higashi sekibutsu) is a group of religious statues carved in bas-relief into a tuff cliff in Ogata neighborhood of the city of Bungo-Ōno, Ōita Prefecture on the island of Kyushu, Japan. The site was designated a National Historic Site of Japan in 1934.

== Overview ==
Constructing Buddha statues out of stone is widely practiced in Buddhist areas in Asia. These images can be divided into three broad types: Magaibutsu (磨崖仏), bas-relief images carved directly into a cliff face, movable independent stone Buddhas carved from cut stone, and cave Buddhas carved inside rock caves, The Inukai images can be classed as Magaibutsu.

The Ogatamiyasako East Stone images are carved into a 7-meter high and 7-meter wide cliff on the east side of a hill that juts out on the right bank of the Ogata River, a tributary of the Ōno River. From the right, there are six statues whose names are unknown, but which are believed to be a standing statue of Fudō Myōō, a seated statue of a Nyorai, a standing statue of Jikokuten, a standing statue of Bishamonten, and a standing statue of Niō. It is thought that the composition is centered around the central seated Nyorai statue, now believed to be a Dainichi Nyorai. which is a jōrokubutsu, with no spiral hair carved on its head and wearing a robe, with its left hand on its knees in the sign of prayer, and its right hand on its chest in a prayer gesture. A stone lantern with the date of 1839 dedicated to Yakushi Nyorai indicate that it was previously worshiped as Yakushi Nyorai. The carvings date from the late Heian period to early Kamakura period.

There are also two hōtō pagodas in the form of twin towers about one meter high outside the rock cave. These carvings date from the early Muromachi period.

Approximately 500 meters away is the Ogatamiyasako West Stone Buddhas, which is also designated as a National Historic Site.

The site is approximately 30 minutes walk from Ogata Station on the JR Kyushu Hōhi Main Line.

== See also ==
- List of Historic Sites of Japan (Ōita)
