= Ōno River =

Ōno River Ōno-gawa
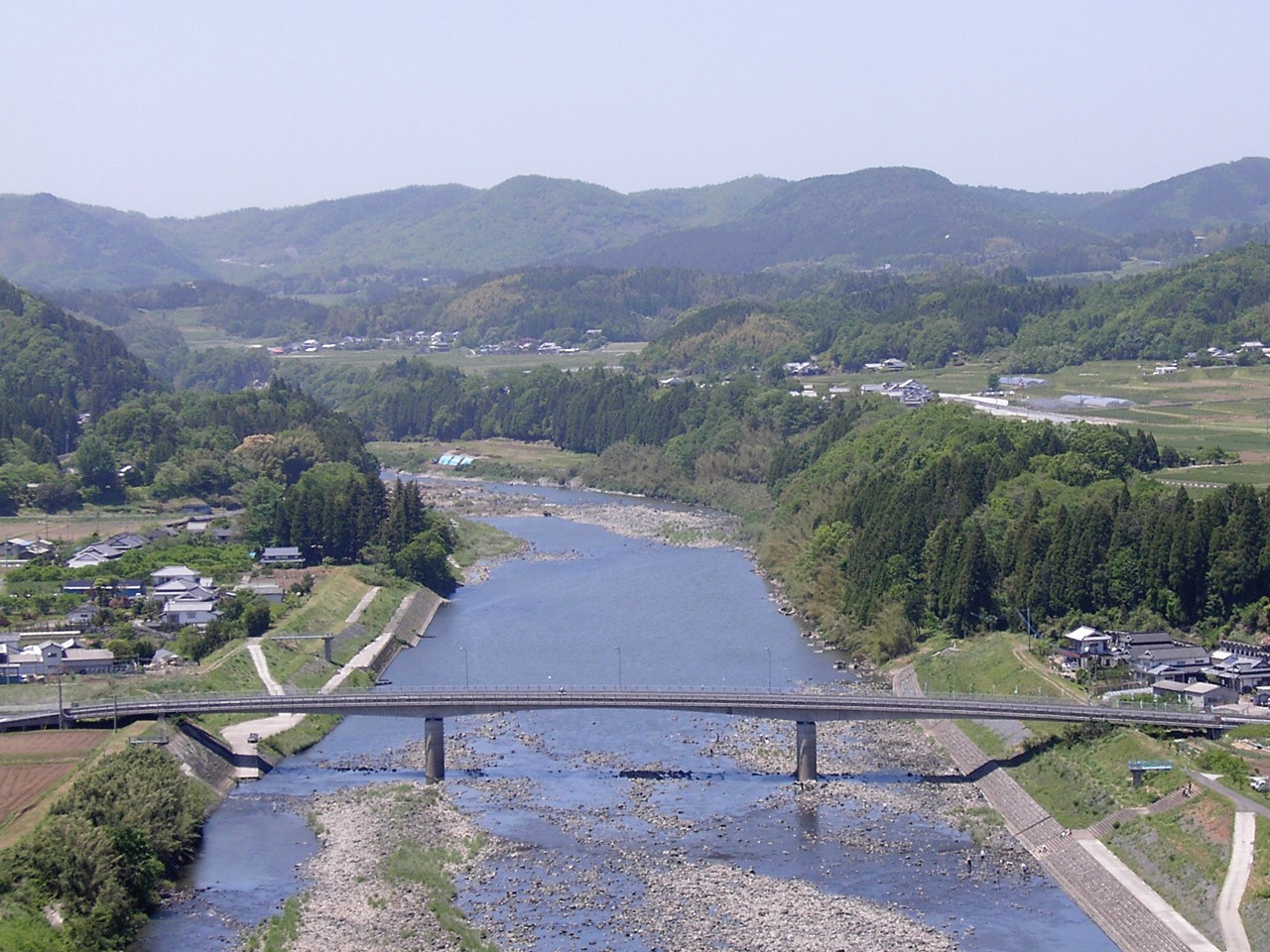
- Ōno River at Mie.

- Location within Japan
- Native name: 大野川 (Japanese)

Location
- Country: Japan
- Prefectures: Kumamoto; Miyazaki; Ōita

Physical characteristics
- Mouth
  - coordinates: 33°16′37″N 131°41′55″E
- Length: 107 km (66 mi)
- Basin size: 1,465 km^{2} (566 mi^{2})

Basin features
- River system: Ōno River
- Dams: Hakusui Dam

The Ōno River (大野川, Ōno-gawa) is a Class A river that originates in Ōita Prefecture, Japan. After running through the southern and central portions of Ōita Prefecture, it runs through the eastern part of Kumamoto Prefecture and the northern part of Miyazaki Prefecture.

The Hakusui Dam, constructed in 1938, is one of twelve dams located on the river.

The river includes Harajiri Falls which is located in Bungo-Ōno, Ōita Prefecture.
