= Asaji, Ōita =

Dissolved municipality in Ōita prefecture, Japan

Asaji (朝地町, Asaji-machi) was a town located in Ōno District, Ōita Prefecture, Japan.

As of 2003, the town had an estimated population of 3,304 and the density of 48.31 persons per km^{2}. The total area was 68.39 km^{2}.

On March 31, 2005, Asaji, along with the towns of Inukai, Mie, Ogata and Ōno, and the villages of Chitose and Kiyokawa (all from Ōno District), was merged to create the city of Bungo-Ōno.
