= Ogatamiyasako West Stone Buddhas =

Group of Japanese Buddhist statues

- 緒方宮迫西石仏 (Japanese)
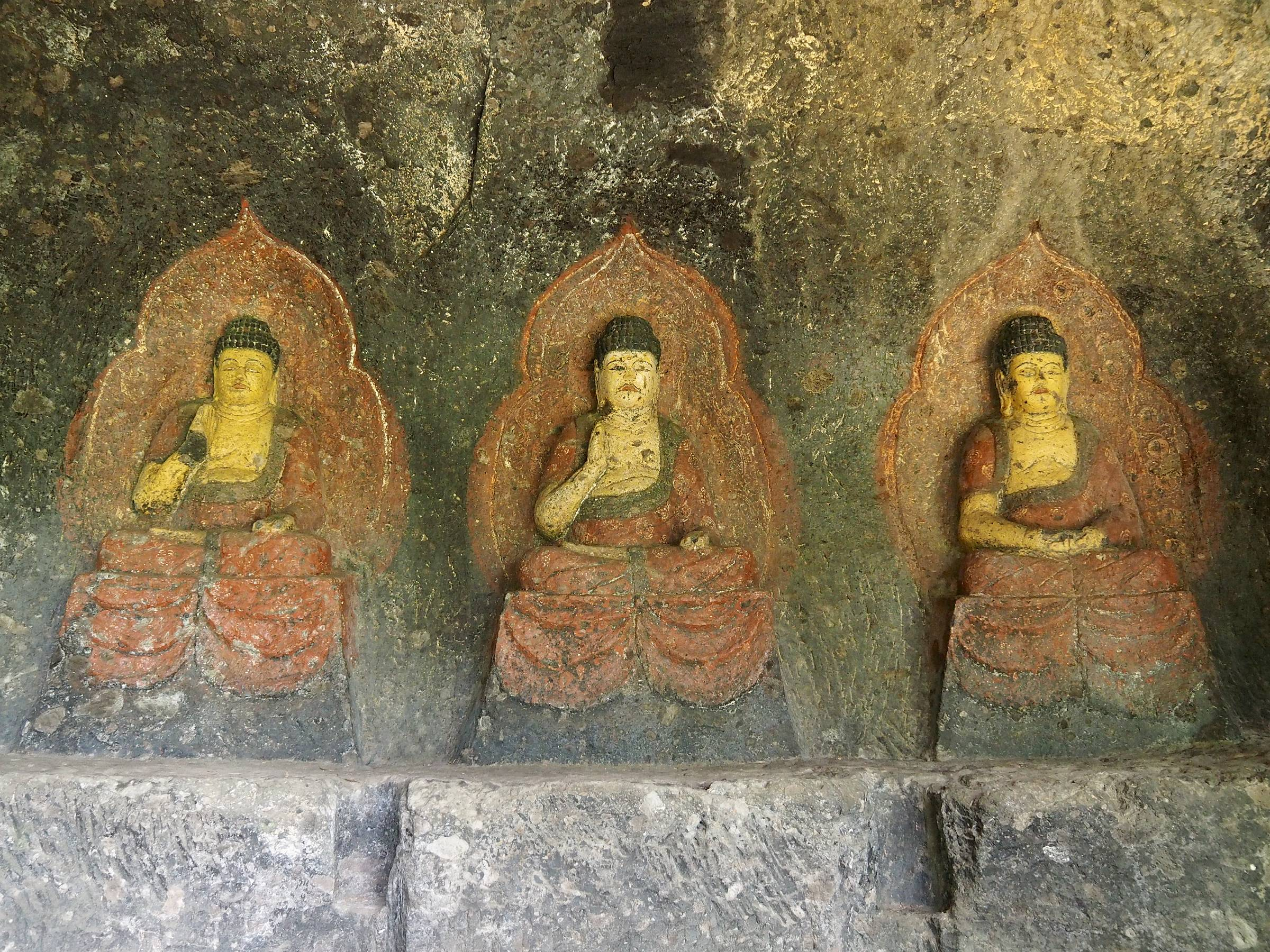
- Ogatamiyasako West Stone Buddhas

- Ogatamiyasako West Stone Buddhas Ogatamiyasako West Stone Buddhas (Japan)
- Interactive map of Ogatamiyasako West Stone Buddhas
- 32°57′41.9″N 131°27′27.6″E
- Periods: Heian period
- Location: Bungo-Ōno, Ōita Prefecture, Japan
- Region: Kyushu

Site notes
- Public access: Yes

The Ogatamiyasako West Stone Buddhas (緒方宮迫西石仏, Ogatamiyasako nishi sekibutsu) is a group of religious statues carved in bas-relief into a tuff cliff in Ogata neighborhood of the city of Bungo-Ōno, Ōita Prefecture on the island of Kyushu, Japan. The site was designated a National Historic Site of Japan in 1934.

== Overview ==
Constructing Buddha statues out of stone is widely practiced in Buddhist areas in Asia. These images can be divided into three broad types: Magaibutsu (磨崖仏), bas-relief images carved directly into a cliff face, movable independent stone Buddhas carved from cut stone, and cave Buddhas carved inside rock caves, The Inukai images can be classed as Magaibutsu.

The Ogatamiyasako West Stone images are carved into a cliff on the west side of a hill that juts out on the right bank of the Ogata River, a tributary of the Ōno River. It is said to have been built by Ogata Koreyoshi, a Bungo samurai-priest. The images are a trio of bas-relief statues centered round a Shaka Nyorai, with Amida Nyorai on the right and Yakushi Nyorai on the left. The statues are 1.4 meters high, and are carved from the back wall to a thickness similar to that of a round carving. Each has spiral hair, long faces, thick eyebrows, stern eyes, and full body, and the coloring remains in relatively good preservation. The flesh is ocher, the front of the clothes is vermilion, the folds are ultramarine blue, the eyebrows, eyes, and beard are painted in ink, and the lips are painted in ink. is dotted with vermilion.The statues date from the late Heian period

Approximately 500 meters away is the Ogatamiyasako East Stone Buddhas, which is also designated as a National Historic Site.

The site is approximately 36 minutes walk from Ogata Station on the JR Kyushu Hōhi Main Line.

== See also ==
- List of Historic Sites of Japan (Ōita)
