= Kiyokawa, Ōita =

Dissolved municipality in Ōita prefecture, Japan

Kiyokawa (清川村, Kiyokawa-mura) was a village located in Ōno District, Ōita Prefecture, Japan.

As of 2003, the village had an estimated population of 2,488 and the density of 52.73 persons per km^{2}. The total area was 47.18 km^{2}.

On March 31, 2005, Kiyokawa, along with the towns of Asaji, Inukai, Mie, Ogata and Ōno, and the village of Chitose (all from Ōno District), was merged to create the city of Bungo-Ōno.
