= Iwato Site =

Archaeological site in Bungo-Ōno, Japan

- 岩戸遺跡 (Japanese)
- Iwato Site Iwato Site (Japan)
- Interactive map of Iwato Site
- 32°58′54.2″N 131°32′47.0″E
- Periods: Japanese Paleolithic
- Location: Bungo-Ōno, Ōita, Japan
- Region: Kyushu

Site notes
- Public access: Yes (park)

The Iwato Site (岩戸遺跡, Iwato iseki) is an archaeological site located in the Usui, Kiyokawa-cho neighborhood of the city of Bungo-Ōno, Ōita Prefecture, on the island of Kyushu, Japan. It was designated a National Historic Site of Japan in 1981.

== Overview ==
Iwato Site is located on a plateau near the confluence of the Ōno River and its tributary, the Okudake River at an elevation of 117 meters. The site consists of layers of volcanic ash deposited on top of tuff from Mount Aso, which makes stratigraphic dating accurate. During the initial investigation, conducted in 1967, Kokeshi-shaped rock figurines estimated to be approximately 24,000 to 20,000 years old were discovered along with numerous stone tools. These are the oldest human-shaped relics yet discovered in Japan. During the second archaeological excavation conducted in 1979, was appeared to be a mass grave was discovered, with four pieces of human right upper canine and incisor teeth, pieces of marine shells unearthed. Three-edge pointed tools and knife-shaped stone tools were also discovered. Since all of the artifacts were small pieces, it was difficult to determine whether this was an aggregated tomb, but if so it would be the oldest yet found in Japan.

Excavated items are on display at the Kiyokawa History and Folklore Museum. The site is approximately five minutes by car from Bungo-Kiyokawa Station on the JR Kyushu Hōhi Main Line.

== See also ==
- List of Historic Sites of Japan (Ōita)
