= Ōno, Ōita =

Dissolved municipality in Ōita prefecture, Japan

Ōno (大野町, Ōno-machi) was a town located in Ōno District, Ōita Prefecture, Japan.

As of 2003, the town had an estimated population of 5,317 and the density of 48.56 persons per km^{2}. The total area was 109.49 km^{2}.

On March 31, 2005, Ōno, along with the towns of Asaji, Inukai, Mie and Ogata, and the villages of Chitose and Kiyokawa (all from Ōno District), was merged to create the city of Bungo-Ōno.
