= Inukai, Ōita =

Dissolved municipality in Ōita prefecture, Japan

Inukai (犬飼町, Inukai-machi) was a town located in Ōno District, Ōita Prefecture, Japan.

As of 2003, the town had an estimated population of 4,324 and the density of 92.51 persons per km^{2}. The total area was 46.74 km^{2}.

On March 31, 2005, Inukai, along with the towns of Asaji, Mie, Ogata and Ōno, and the villages of Chitose and Kiyokawa (all from Ōno District), was merged to create the city of Bungo-Ōno.

== Notable people ==
=== Fictional ===
- Souichi Negishi/Johannes Krauser II, protagonist of comedy manga and live-action movie Detroit Metal City.
