= Seishirō Etō =

Japanese politician

- 衛藤 征士郎
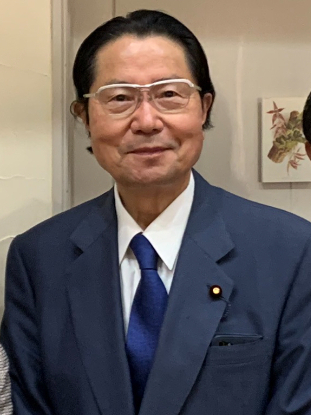
- Etō in 2021

Vice Speaker of the House of Representatives
- In office 16 September 2009 – 16 November 2012
- Speaker: Takahiro Yokomichi
- Preceded by: Takahiro Yokomichi
- Succeeded by: Hirotaka Akamatsu

Director-General of the Japan Defense Agency
- In office 8 August 1995 – 11 January 1996
- Prime Minister: Tomiichi Murayama
- Preceded by: Tokuichiro Tamazawa
- Succeeded by: Hideo Usui

Member of the House of Representatives
- In office 18 December 1983 – 9 October 2024
- Preceded by: Tadafumi Hatano
- Succeeded by: Ken Hirose
- Constituency: Ōita 1st (1983–1996); Ōita 2nd (1996–2009); Kyushu PR (2009–2012); Ōita 2nd (2012–2024)

Member of the House of Councillors
- In office 11 July 1977 – 9 July 1983
- Preceded by: Ryōhei Kudō
- Succeeded by: Keigi Kajiwara
- Constituency: Ōita at-large

Mayor of Kusu
- In office 30 April 1971 – 12 June 1977
- Preceded by: Kōdayū Yoshioka
- Succeeded by: Umeno Makita

Personal details
- Born: 29 April 1941 (age 85) Koshin, Zenranan-dō, Japanese Korea (now Gangjin, South Jeolla, South Korea)
- Party: Liberal Democratic
- Education: Waseda University

Seishirō Etō (衛藤 征士郎, Etō Seishirō; born 29 April 1941) is a former Japanese politician of the Liberal Democratic Party, who served as a member of the House of Councillors and the House of Representatives in the Diet of Japan.

== Career ==
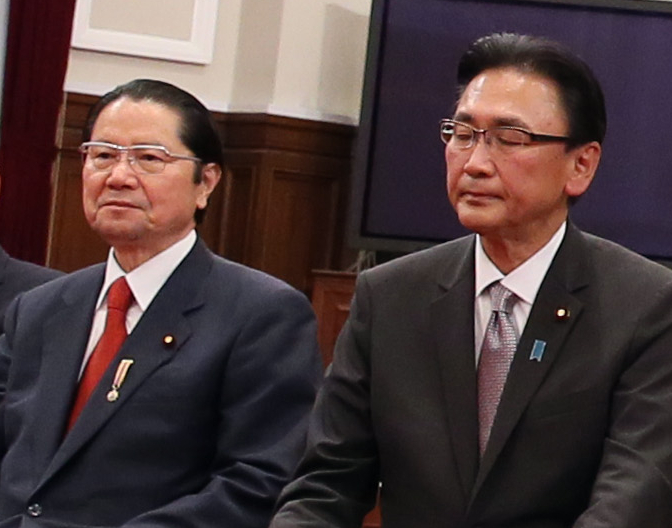
Etō with Keiji Furuya (at the Presidential Office Building (Republic of China) on 20 May 2016)

A native of Kusu District, Ōita, he attended Waseda University as both undergraduate and graduate. He was elected: in 1971 as the Mayor of the town of Kusu, Ōita, elected in 1977 to the House of Councilors and elected in 1983 to the House of Representatives for his inaugural term; Eto has been returned to office eight times for the 2nd District for Oita Prefecture. In 1995, he was the Director General of the Japan Defense Agency and in 2001, he was Senior Vice Minister for Foreign Affairs. In 2002, he was elected as a head of the LDP's Oita Prefecture chapter and in 2009, he was elected as Vice-Speaker for the House of Representatives.

Etō was a leader in the movement to make Mountain Day a national holiday, and was affiliated with the revisionist lobby Nippon Kaigi.

== Honours ==
- Armenia: Medal of Honour by the National Assembly of Armenia.
- Netherlands: Knight Grand Cross of the Order of Orange-Nassau (29 October 2014)
- Pakistan: Hilal-i-Pakistan (2019).
