= Notsu, Ōita =

Dissolved municipality in Ōno district, Ōita prefecture, Japan

Notsu (野津町, Notsu-machi) was a town located in Ōno District, Ōita Prefecture, Japan.

== Population ==
As of 2003, the town had an estimated population of 9,309 and the density of 66.88 persons per km^{2}. The total area was 139.19 km^{2}.

== Merge ==
On January 1, 2005, Notsu was merged into the expanded city of Usuki.
