= Sugao Stone Buddhas =

Group of Japanese statues

- 菅尾磨崖仏 (Japanese)
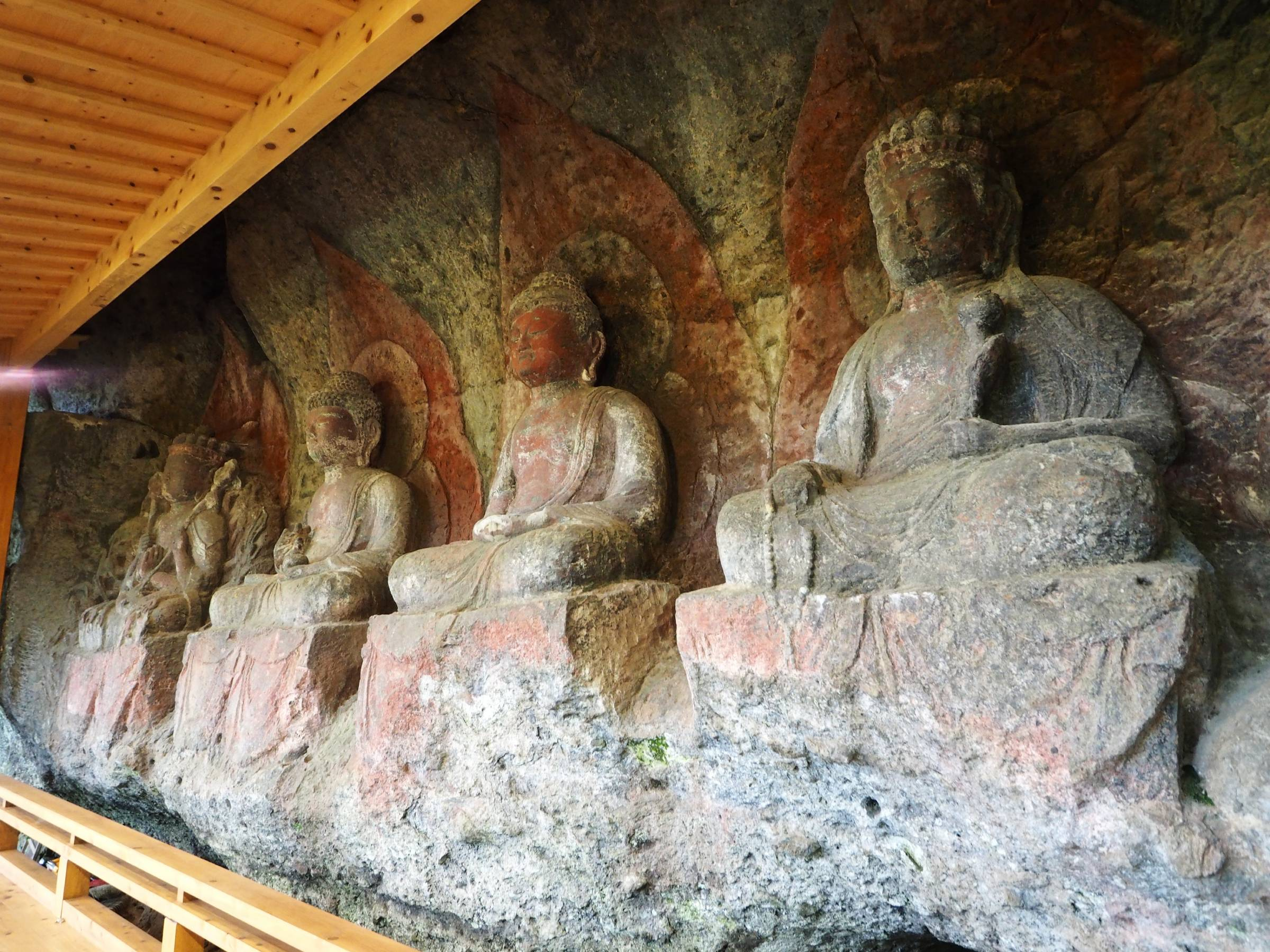
- Sugao Stone Buddhas

- Sugao Stone Buddhas Sugao Stone Buddhas (Japan)
- Interactive map of Sugao Stone Buddhas
- 33°1′28.2″N 131°36′58.2″E
- Periods: Heian period
- Location: Bungo-Ōno, Ōita Prefecture, Japan
- Region: Kyushu

Site notes
- Public access: Yes

The Sugao Stone Buddhas (菅尾磨崖仏, Sugao magaibutsu) is a group of religious statues carved in bas-relief into a tuff cliff in Mie neighborhood of the city of Bungo-Ōno, Ōita Prefecture on the island of Kyushu, Japan. The site was designated a National Historic Site of Japan in 1934, and was designated a National Important Cultural Property in 1964.

== Overview ==
Constructing Buddha statues out of stone is widely practiced in Buddhist areas in Asia. These images can be divided into three broad types: Magaibutsu (磨崖仏), bas-relief images carved directly into a cliff face, movable independent stone Buddhas carved from cut stone, and cave Buddhas carved inside rock caves, The Sugao images can be classed as Magaibutsu.

The Sugao images are located a stone niche approximately nine meters wide and four meters high carved into the tuff rock wall on the hillside on the east bank of the Ōno River. Commonly known as the Iwa Gongen (岩権現), the site consists of a total of five half-relief carvings: Senjū Kannon, Yakushi Nyōrai, Amitabha Nyōrai, and Jūichimen Kannon seated from left to right, and a standing statue of Tamon-ten on the slightly diagonal wall to the far right. The four seated statues bear flame halos, and are seated on square pedestals with a hanging hem. Each image is between 1.8 and 1.9 meters in height. The state of preservation is relatively good, and some traces of coloring remains. Each statue has a graceful rounded face, and the body shape of the shoulders and firm knees is also rich in volume, so it is believed that they were created in the late Heian period (late 12th century).

The site is approximately 25 minutes walk from Sugao Station on the JR Kyushu Hōhi Main Line.

== See also ==
- List of Historic Sites of Japan (Ōita)
