= Ogata, Ōita =

Dissolved municipality in Ōita prefecture, Japan

Ogata (緒方町, Ogata-machi) was a town located in Ōno District, Ōita Prefecture, Japan.

== Population ==
As of 2003, the town had an estimated population of 6,277 and the density of 42.42 persons per km^{2}. The total area was 147.96 km^{2}.

== History ==
The history of Ogata town is based on ancient Japanese history that includes the legendary hero Ogata no Saburo Koreyoshi. Saburo, feared by many as the "descendent of a giant serpent", also appears in the Tale of the Heike and is said to have contributed greatly to Minamoto no Yoshitsune's success in the battle of Dan-no-ura. Ogata town is home to three shrines built by Saburo, called "Ogata Sansha". Saburo himself is enshrined in one of these, called the "Ninomiya Hachiman Shrine", where his name is still transmitted to today's generation. Ogata no Saburo Koreyoshi's younger brother Ogata Shuma "Jiraiya" is believed to be the first "Ninjia" in Japanese folklore.

The legend in the "Heike Tales" refers to Yoshitune's decision to lead his armies in Kyūshū. According to Helen Craig McCullough, she references the unique disposition of Minamoto choosing his chief warrior. Ogata no Saburo Koreyoshi commanded the largest armies in Kyūshū and marched in the name of the future shōgun that led to the establishment of the Kamakura period. While establishing the "Ogata" clan-Saburo also built one of the most famous castles in Kyūshū – Oka Castle (ja) for the new shōgun. Today Oka Castle remains in ruins after many wars. However, the legacy of Ogata no Saburo Koreyoshi and the establishment of the Ogata clan in Japan was historic.

== Merge ==
On March 31, 2005, Ogata, along with the towns of Asaji, Inukai, Mie and Ōno, and the villages of Chitose and Kiyokawa (all from Ōno District), was merged to create the city of Bungo-ōno.
