= Bungo-Ōno =

Bungo-Ōno 豊後大野市
- City
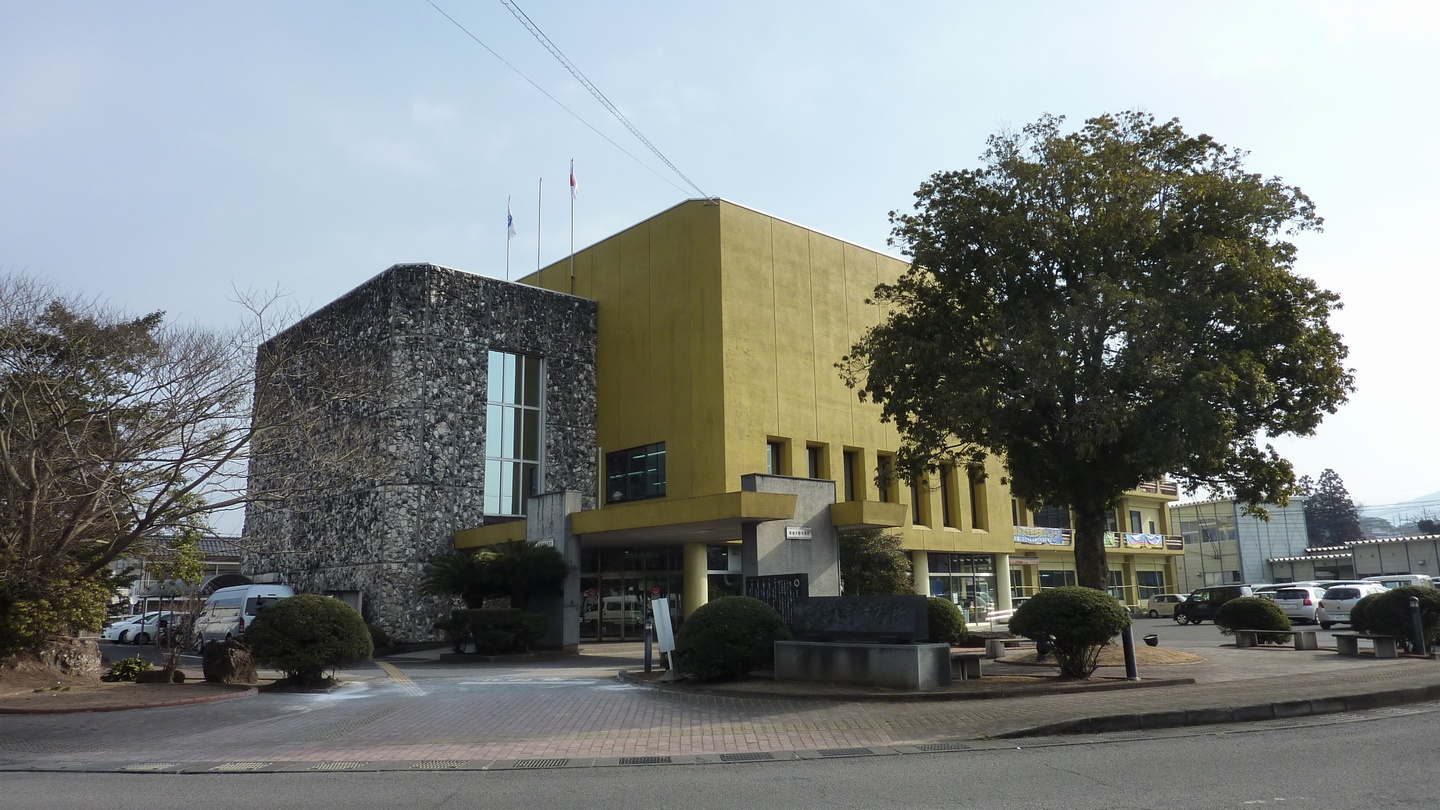
- Bungo-Ōno City Office

- Flag Chapter

- Location of Bungo-Ōno in Ōita Prefecture

- Location in Japan
- Coordinates: 32°58′39″N 131°35′03″E
- Country: Japan
- Region: Kyushu
- Prefecture: Ōita

Government
  - Mayor: Fumitoshi Kawano (since April 2017)

Area
  - Total: 603.14 km^{2} (232.87 sq mi)

Population (November 30, 2023)
  - Total: 32,846
  - Density: 54.458/km^{2} (141.05/sq mi)
- Time zone: UTC+09:00 (JST)
- City hall address: 1200 Mie-cho Ichiba, Bungo-Ōno-shi, Oita-ken 879-7198
- Climate: Cfa
- Website: Official website
- Symbols
- Flower: Phoney cherry
- Tree: Quercus acutissima

Bungo-Ōno (豊後大野市, Bungo-Ōno-shi) is a city located in Ōita Prefecture, Japan. As of 30 November 2023, the city had an estimated population of 32,846 in 15706 households, and a population density of 54 persons per km^{2}. The total area of the city is 603.13 km^{2} (232.87 sq mi).

== Geography ==
Bungo-Ōno is located in southern Ōita Prefecture, approximately 35 kilometers south of the prefectural capital at Ōita City. With the exception of the center of the former Mie Town (which is the main urban center), most of the city area is hills and forests, and on the border with Miyazaki Prefecture, there is the 1756 meter Mount Soboyama and the lesser peaks of the Kyushu Mountains. Parts of the city are within the borders of the Sobo-Katamuki Quasi-National Park.

=== Neighboring municipalities ===
Miyazaki Prefecture

- Hinokage
- Takachiho

Ōita Prefecture

- Ōita
- Saiki
- Taketa
- Usuki

=== Climate ===
Bungo-Ōno has a humid subtropical climate (Köppen climate classification Cfa) with hot summers and cool winters. Precipitation is significant throughout the year, but is somewhat lower in winter. The average annual temperature in Bungo-Ōno is 15.3 °C (59.5 °F). The average annual rainfall is 1,791.8 mm (70.54 in) with June as the wettest month. The temperatures are highest on average in August, at around 26.4 °C (79.5 °F), and lowest in January, at around 4.5 °C (40.1 °F). The highest temperature ever recorded in Bungo-Ōno was 39.0 °C (102.2 °F) on 27 July 2008; the coldest temperature ever recorded was −8.5 °C (16.7 °F) on 11 February 1996.

Climate data for Inukai, Bungo-Ōno (1991−2020 normals, extremes 1977−present)
Month	Jan	Feb	Mar	Apr	May	Jun	Jul	Aug	Sep	Oct	Nov	Dec	Year
Record high °C (°F)	21.5 (70.7)	24.3 (75.7)	28.5 (83.3)	31.6 (88.9)	36.1 (97.0)	35.4 (95.7)	39.0 (102.2)	38.8 (101.8)	36.3 (97.3)	32.4 (90.3)	29.9 (85.8)	23.7 (74.7)	39.0 (102.2)
Mean daily maximum °C (°F)	10.6 (51.1)	11.9 (53.4)	15.4 (59.7)	20.9 (69.6)	25.1 (77.2)	27.1 (80.8)	31.4 (88.5)	32.4 (90.3)	28.4 (83.1)	23.3 (73.9)	17.9 (64.2)	12.6 (54.7)	21.4 (70.5)
Daily mean °C (°F)	4.5 (40.1)	5.5 (41.9)	8.9 (48.0)	13.9 (57.0)	18.5 (65.3)	21.8 (71.2)	25.8 (78.4)	26.4 (79.5)	22.7 (72.9)	17.2 (63.0)	11.6 (52.9)	6.4 (43.5)	15.3 (59.5)
Mean daily minimum °C (°F)	−0.6 (30.9)	0.1 (32.2)	3.2 (37.8)	7.8 (46.0)	12.8 (55.0)	17.7 (63.9)	21.9 (71.4)	22.3 (72.1)	18.7 (65.7)	12.4 (54.3)	6.4 (43.5)	1.3 (34.3)	10.3 (50.6)
Record low °C (°F)	−8.1 (17.4)	−8.5 (16.7)	−6.6 (20.1)	−2.5 (27.5)	1.0 (33.8)	8.1 (46.6)	13.2 (55.8)	15.4 (59.7)	6.3 (43.3)	0.6 (33.1)	−2.9 (26.8)	−7.5 (18.5)	−8.5 (16.7)
Average precipitation mm (inches)	47.6 (1.87)	63.2 (2.49)	98.3 (3.87)	112.8 (4.44)	131.9 (5.19)	325.7 (12.82)	287.1 (11.30)	204.8 (8.06)	271.6 (10.69)	132.3 (5.21)	69.6 (2.74)	46.9 (1.85)	1,791.8 (70.54)
Average precipitation days (≥ 1.0 mm)	5.4	7.1	9.9	9.4	9.3	14.6	12.4	10.9	10.9	7.2	6.9	5.2	109.2
Mean monthly sunshine hours	156.3	150.7	172.9	187.1	187.2	125.9	175.4	197.8	150.9	167.5	152.2	157.5	1,981.6
Source: Japan Meteorological Agency

=== Demographics ===
Per Japanese census data, the population of Bungo-Ōno in 2020 is 33,695 people. Bungo-Ōno has been conducting censuses since 1960.

Historical population
Year	Pop.	±%
1960	74,803	—
1965	65,943	−11.8%
1970	58,312	−11.6%
1975	53,513	−8.2%
1980	51,975	−2.9%
1985	50,011	−3.8%
1990	47,034	−6.0%
1995	45,191	−3.9%
2000	43,371	−4.0%
2005	41,548	−4.2%
2010	39,459	−5.0%
2015	36,584	−7.3%
2020	33,695	−7.9%
Bungo-Ōno population statistics

== History ==
The area of Bungo-Ōno was part of ancient Bungo Province. During the Edo period the entire area was part of the holdings of Usuki Domain and was ruled by the Inaba clan until the Meiji restoration. The village of Mie within Ōno District, Ōita was established on May 1, 1889 with the creation of the modern municipalities system. It was raised to town status on April 4, 1902. The city of Bungo-Ōno was established on March 31, 2005, from the merger between Mie and the towns of Asaji, Inukai, Ogata and Ōno, and the villages of Chitose and Kiyokawa (all from Ōno District).

== Government ==
Bungo-Ōno has a mayor-council form of government with a directly elected mayor and a unicameral city council of 18 members. Bungo-Ōno contributes two members to the Ōita Prefectural Assembly. In terms of national politics, the city is part of the Ōita 2nd district of the lower house of the Diet of Japan.

== Economy ==
The economy of Bungo-Ōno is overwhelmingly agricultural, although due to ease of access to Ōita city, commuter town developments are growing. In 2012, the growing deer population began to greatly affect the shiitake mushroom farming industry.

== Education ==
Bungo-Ōno has 11 public elementary schools and seven public junior high schools operated by the city government. The city has one public high school operated by the Ōita Prefectural Board of Education. The prefecture operates one agricultural training college.

== Transportation ==
=== Railways ===
JR Kyushu - Hōhi Main Line

- Asaji - Ogata - Bungo-Kiyokawa - Miemachi - Sugao - Inukai

=== Highways ===
- Naka-Kyushu Odan Road
- National Route 10
- National Route 57
- National Route 326
- National Route 442
- National Route 502

== Sister cities ==
- Jingzhou, Jingzhou, Hubei, China, since September 1994
- Gijang County, South Korea, since September 2003
- Iksan, North Jeolla, South Korea, since August 2005

== Local attractions ==
- Harajiri Falls - waterfall sometimes called the "Niagara Falls of the East"
- Inazumi Underwater Cave - largest underwater limestone cave in Japan
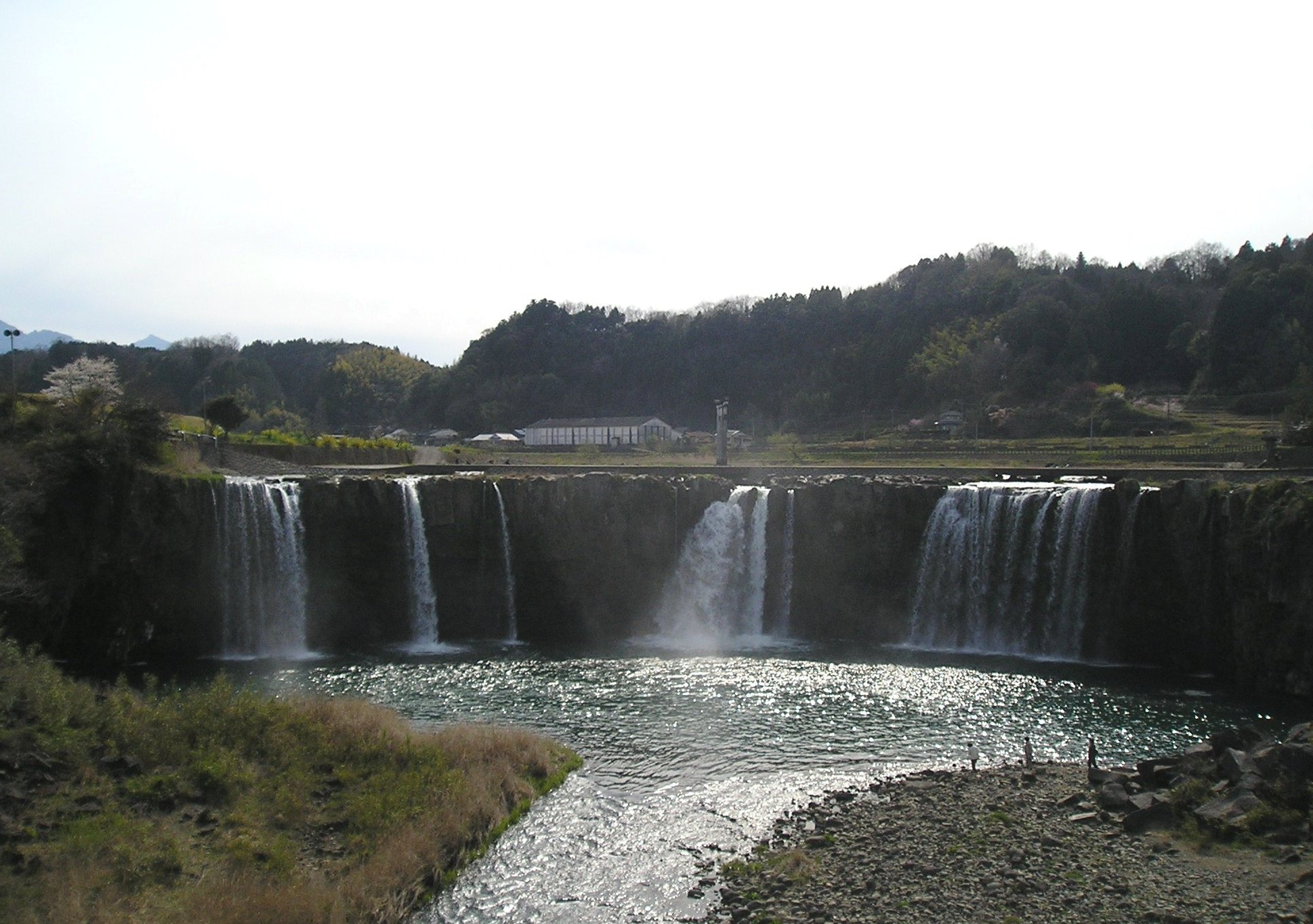
  Harajiri Falls

=== National Historic Sites ===
- Iwato Site - Japanese Paleolithic site
- Inukai Stone Buddhas, Kamakura period Buddhist cliff-side carving
- Ogatamiyasako East Stone Buddhas, Heian period Buddhist stone carvings
- Ogatamiyasako West Stone Buddhas, Heian period Buddhist stone carvings
- Sugao Stone Buddhas, Heian period Buddhist stone carvings

== Noted people from Bungo-Ōno ==
- Mamoru Shigemitsu, politician, former Foreign Minister
