= Ōno District, Ōita =

Former district in Ōita prefecture, Japan

Ōno (大野郡, Ōno-gun) was a district located in Ōita Prefecture, Japan.

As of January 1, 2005, the district had 6 towns and 2 villages:

- Asaji
- Chitose
- Inukai
- Kiyokawa
- Mie
- Notsu
- Ogata
- Ōno

On January 1, 2005, the town of Notsu was merged into the expanded city of Usuki.

On March 31, 2005, the towns of Asaji, Inukai, Mie, Ogata and Ōno, and the villages of Chitose and Kiyokawa were merged to create the city of Bungo-ōno. Therefore, Ōno District was dissolved as a result of this merger.

== Timeline ==
- February 1, 1956:
  - Parts of the town of Asaji was merged into the town of Ogata.
  - Parts of the town of Asaji was merged into the town of Naoiri (in Naoiri District).
- October 1, 1956 - Parts of the town of Notsu was merged into the town of Mie.
- April 1, 1957:
  - Parts of the village of Kiyokawa was merged into the town of Mie.
  - Parts of the village of Kiyokawa was merged into the town of Ogata.
  - Parts of the town of Inukai was merged into the town of Notsu.
- January 1, 2005 - The town of Notsu was merged into the expanded city of Usuki. (5 towns, 2 villages)
- March 31, 2005 - The towns of Asaji, Inukai, Mie, Ogata and Ōno, and the villages of Chitose and Kiyokawa were merged to create the city of Bungo-Ōno. Ōno District was dissolved as a result of this merger.
