= Hajime Yoshikawa =

Japanese politician

- 吉川 元
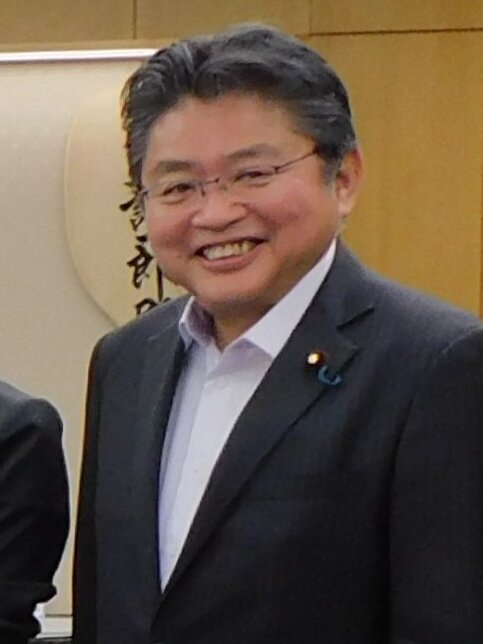
- Yoshikawa in 2025

Member of the House of Representatives
- In office 21 December 2012 – 23 January 2026
- Preceded by: Takatoshi Nakashima
- Succeeded by: Multi-member district
- Constituency: Kyushu PR

Personal details
- Born: 28 September 1966 (age 60) Marugame, Kagawa, Japan
- Party: CRA (since 2026)
- Other political affiliations: JSP (1990–1996); SDP (1996–2020); CDP (2020–2026)
- Education: Kobe University

Hajime Yoshikawa (Japanese: 吉川 元, Hepburn: Yoshikawa Hajime; born 28 September 1967) is a Japanese politician and a member of the Constitutional Democratic Party who served in the House of Representatives. Before 2020, he was a member of the Social Democratic Party. He is opposed to the Anti-Conspiracy Bill.
