= Chinzei Rebellion =

1180 battle part of the Genpei War

- Part of Genpei War
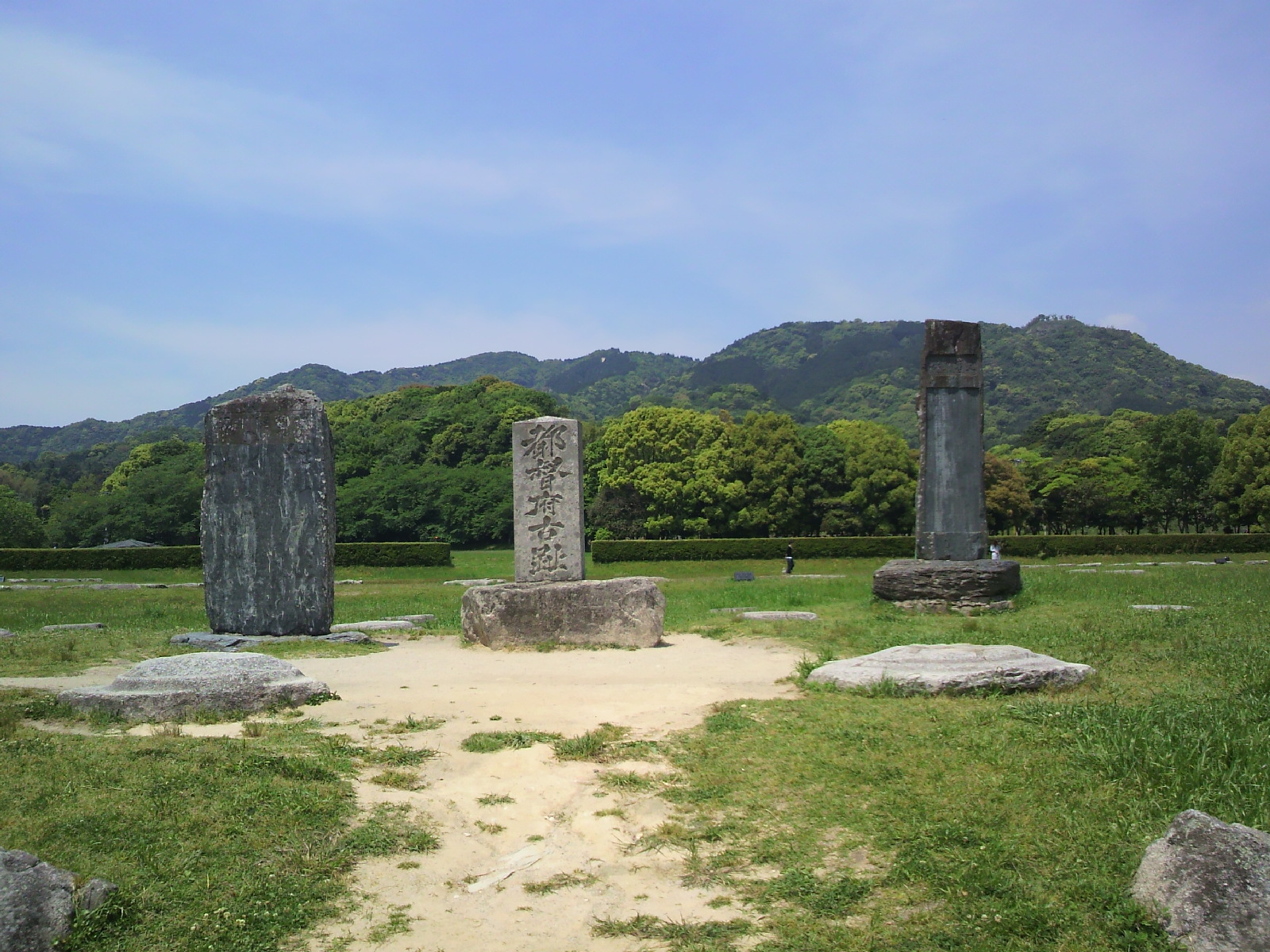
- Site of the former Dazaifu Headquarters
| Date | Mid September 1180 – April 1182 (Jishō calendar) |
| Location | Dazaifu, Bungo Province (Northern Kyushu Island) |
| Result | Taira victory |

Belligerents
| Taira clan | Gōzoku of Higo Province; Local Decentralized Rebels; Local Warrior Monks |

Commanders and leaders
| (Taira clan) Harada Tanenao (February – September 1181); (Taira clan) Taira no Sadayoshi (August 1181 – 1182) | Kikuchi Takanao; Ogata no Koreyoshi; (Taira clan) Harada Tanenao (From September 1181) |

Strength
| 2,000 (1181) (Azuma Kagami); 3,000 (1182) (Heike Monogatari) | 600 (1181) (Azuma Kagami) |

The Chinzei Rebellion (鎮西反乱, Chinzei Hansan) was a military rebellion carried out by Gōzoku clans led by Kikuchi Takanao and Ogata Koreyoshi against the Taira clan led by Harada Tanenao (before potentially switching sides) and Taira no Sadayoshi in the Higo and Bungo (potentially spreading beyond those) provinces of Kyushu, with most of the fighting happening near the Dazaifu regional government. It started in the middle of September 1180, and was put down by Taira forces in April 1182.

The rebellion was first mentioned in the Gyokuyou, where it states Taira no Kiyomori sent a private army to deal with it, however no other historical documents can verify this happened, potentially leading to the unopposed nature of the rebellion. The rebellion continued to grow until an Imperial Decree was sent out in early January 1181, declaring that all Nine Provinces of Kyushu are to work together to crush the uprising.

On 12 February, Ogata Koreyoshi had joined the rebellion, potentially joining forces with Takanao. (Note: This is according to the Heike Monogatari, however it is considered unlikely due to opposition between the two.) The next day, a High Priest sent a messenger to the Taira in Kyoto warning about the start of a rebellion. Taira no Sadayoshi stated that he'll go down to Kyushu himself to check on it, however he only arrived there in August.

On 15 February, it was discovered that sixteen conspirators had joined the rebellion, causing the Imperial Court to dispatch chief commander Taira no Shigehira to the western provinces which was quickly cancelled only eleven days later. Another Imperial Decree was sent on 14 April, communicating orders to hunt down Kikuchi Takanao.

In August, Sadayoshi was appointed as governor of Higo and was ordered to put down the rebellion. The rebellion continued to worsen as Sadayoshi's army starved, causing him to spend his time seizing public and private property in order to supply his army. On 23 March, Sadayoshi forcibly took over the entire provincial government. In April, Sadayoshi gathered a large group of private agents and began raiding the countryside. He treated the local people with cruelty in order to get "war rice", causing Takanao to put down his arms in order to avoid similar treatment.

Despite the Taira success in suppressing the rebellion, the Taira control over Chinzei had weakened. In 1183, when Minamoto no Yoshikama threatened to advance on the capital, Sadayoshi took his forces and marched toward Kyoto. Takanao, now fighting for the Taira, claimed that he was going to clear a path, but instead abandoned them and ignored all orders. Many powerful clans in the west were uncooperative towards the Taira, causing the Taira to be driven out of western provinces.

The Azuma Kagami and the Gyokuyou by Fujiwara no Kanezane share a similar story on the events of what happened, however they tend to contradict with what the Heike Monogatari claims. Despite this, the Heike Monogatari's validity is questionable due to some of its claims being left out in the Imperial Decrees along with the fierce opposition seen between Takanao and Koreyoshi.

== Beginning ==
=== Azuma Kagami & Gyokuyou ===
The first mention of the rebellion is from the Gyokuyou, a diary kept by Fujiwara no Kanezane, in the entrance for 19 September, stating:

According to hearsay, there are again rebels in Tsukushi. The Zenmon (Taira no Kiyomori) has privately dispatched a punitive expeditionary force.

— Fujiwara no Kanezane

However, no other historical documents can confirm that an army was organized and dispatched at this time, and might explain why Takanao's rebellion continued unopposed for some time. It is thought that Kiyomori may have assumed that the rebellion at this time could be dealt with by the Dazaifu government on its own.

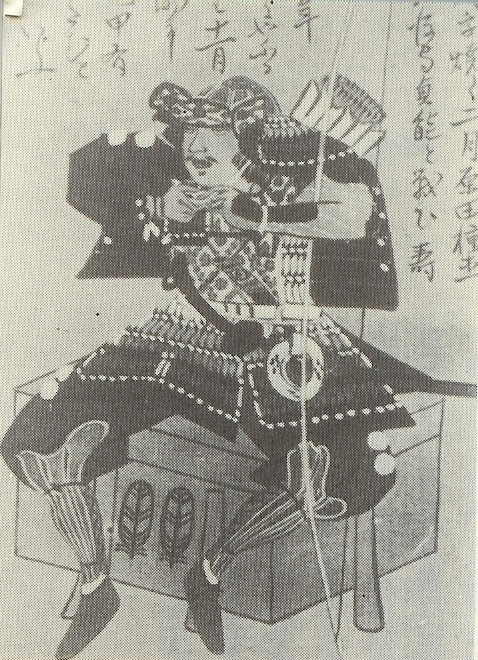
Kikuchi Takanao

The next entrance in the Gyokuyou, however, states that "those plotting rebellion in Chinzei could not be conquered". Due to being faced with several rebellions on all fronts, the Taira clan began pardoning rebels, as they were unable to defeat them. An entrance from 21 November states that "Furthermore, the rebel of Chinzei (Kikuchi Takanao), for no particular reason, has been granted a pardon. If the Kanto (Minamoto no Yoritomo) hears of these matters (pardoning rebels), will he not realize the weakness of our military strength?"

The rebellion continued to rapidly grow, until an Imperial Decree was sent out in early January 1181, declaring that all Nine Provinces of Kyushu are to work together to crush the uprising. Takanao's act of rebellion was significant because it meant that the Taira were losing their influence and military support from the west, which will have started to diminish even further with the Kumano Rebellion causing havoc in Shikoku. Despite this, the rebellion was left to be handled by the local governments, as the eastern rebellions had higher priority in the capital.

On 15 February, it was discovered that sixteen conspirators had joined the rebellion. This led to the Imperial Court deciding to urgently dispatch chief commander Taira no Shigehira to the western provinces. However, this was quickly cancelled by the 26th. On 29 February, a skirmish occurred between the Taira forces and the rebels led by Kikuchi Takanao and Ogata Koreyoshi, with multiple powerful local figures joining the rebels, such as a local high priest and several other local lords. They led a force of about 600 cavalry and set up blockades at key passes and shut down all trade by land and sea. In response, Taira loyalist Harada Tanenao, gathered a force of over 2,000 soldiers from across Kyushu. According to the Azuma Kagami, the battle ended with Takanao's soldiers being heavily wounded, and the Taira force successfully pushing back the rebels.

On the same day, the rebels successfully drove out a local governor in Bungo. This led to Fujiwara no Yorisuke (Minister of Justice) deciding that he must pacify Bungo Province himself, as if the government were to send a large punitive force as they normally do, their conflict with the insurgents would lead to the province being entirely looted and ruined, which he required for his income. Following this, he personally requested Kiyomori send back any expeditionary force he may have sent, to which Kiyomori agreed to.

From 13 to 14 April of the same year, the emperor along with local ministers discussed orders to hunt down Kikuchi Takanao, they officially appointed Harada as a high-ranking administrative to oversee operations, and sent out an Imperial Order:

Fujiwara (Kikuchi) Takanao, a resident of Higo Province: Since recent, he has behaved arbitrarily with military might, suddenly turning his back on Imperial influence. Not only does this affect his home districts and provinces, it has already reached the lands of neighboring provinces. Entirely following a "wolf-like", savage heart, he has formed various disorganized mobs.

Not only this, he has established "white-wave" (chinese metaphor for pirates) rebels upon the sea routes and formed "green-forest" (chinese metaphor for bandits) gangs upon the land. Without regard for whether land is private estate or public land, he plunders the annual taxes and inflicts harm upon the common people.

Because he plots to destroy the nine provinces and intends to reach the Dazaifu. The officials of the Government Office and the soldiers defending it have frequently reported that battles are taking place. Consequently, an expeditionary force was dispatched to conquer him. During that time, the Retired Emperor sent an emissary with orders to use the full strength of the region to restrain him.

Nevertheless, his wicked excesses increase further, and his banditry has not yet ceased. His rebellion is extreme and beyond excuse. It is fitting that the former Right Chief of the Imperial Guard, Taira no Asason (Taira no Munemori), be commanded to mobilize the soldiers of the various provinces under his jurisdiction to strike down and conquer said Takanao, as well as those of the same mind who assist him.

— The Decree: April 14, Jishō 5 (1181)

=== Heike Monogatari ===
According to the Heike Monogatari, on 12 February 1181, Ogata Koreyoshi joined the rebellion, and later Takanori and Ogata Koreyoshi simultaneously rose in rebellion, which is heavily debated on, as they were fierce rivals, so it is thought that while both rebelled against the Taira, they worked independently.

The next day, a High Priest sent a messenger to the Taira in Kyoto. He reported that all the major leaders in Kyushu, including Kikuchi Takanao, Ogata Koreyoshi, and powerful Matsura pirate-warriors, had started a rebellion and were ignoring the government's orders at Dazaifu. The Taira leaders were stunned by this, as they had assumed only the east was rebelling and were planning to use the Kyushu warriors as their main army to crush the east. Taira no Sadayoshi tried to calm the leaders down, stating that he'll go down to Kyushu himself to see it out. However he only arrived in Kyushu in August.

=== Discrepancies ===
Sources such as the Azuma Kagami and the Heike Monogatari record that Kikuchi Takanori and Ogata Koreyoshi formed an alliance and took action against the Taira clan. However, Kudo Keiichi, a historian specialising in medieval Japanese history in the Kyushu region, argues that it would have been unlikely for Kikuchi Takanori and Ogata Koreyoshi to have collaborated to instigate a rebellion, and that, rather, each rebelled independently. Furthermore, there is debate about whether Ogata Koreyoshi was already engaged in the rebellion by February 1181, as stated in the Heike Monogatari. Regarding the battle on 29 February 1181, the Azuma Kagami and Gyokuyou's account of this battle differs, the latter not mentioning Ogata Koreyoshi as a leader, and in the imperial decree of 14 April, Koreyoshi, a supposed central figure in the Bungo part of the rebellion, isn't mentioned either. The legitimacy of the rebellions extent in Bungo is as well disputed, and Yorisukes's own declaration of intent to go down to Bungo, may have been a strategic maneuver to prevent the dispatch of a punitive expedition that would cause significant damage.

The validity of the story in the Heike Monogatari about the High Priests message to Kyoto is disputable. This is because since Koreyoshi is mentioned, it should have been impossible for Koreyoshi's name not to appear in the imperial decree ordering the suppression. Furthermore, the report lists Harada Tanenao as part of the rebellion, but every other source, including the Azuma Kagami and Gyokuyou, list him as a Taira loyalist. As such, it's assumed that the Heike Monogatari either recorded a very brief moment where Tanenao wavered, or (more likely) it was a clerical error in that specific manuscript, misgrouping him with the "Kyushu warriors" who were causing trouble. Consequently, it cannot be taken as definitive proof that forces led by Ogata no Koreyoshi participated in the skirmish in February.

== Suppression ==
In August 1181, Sadayoshi was appointed as governor of Higo, receiving jurisdiction over both the provinces of Chikuzen and Higo, and being ordered to put down the rebels in Kyushu. The Heike Monogatari states that he set out with 3,000 soldiers. The next mention is in September, where it describes that the rebellion in the western provinces was continuing to worsen. Harada seemed to have switched sides, having made peace with the rebels, and joined Kikuchi, now trying to hunt down Sadayoshi together. At this time, Sadayoshi was staying in Bitchū Province with a starving army.

In October of the following year, the Gyokuyou states that "Sadayoshi, having pacified Kyushu, shall bring the leaders [of that region] with him and return to the capital." However Fujiwara no Kazenane (the author) says that this is pure hearsay from within the court. On 21 March, the Gyokuyou entrance reads that messengers from Higo had arrived, stating that Kikuchi had not yet been subdued. Furthermore, instead of fighting the rebels, Sadayoshi was spending all his time seizing public and private property in order to supply his army. The next entrance on 23 March says that a messenger arrived from the provincial government in Higo. He says that Sadayoshi, who was sent there to put down the rebellion, had instead forcibly taken over the entire provincial government, even kicking out a deputy governor.

The following month, in April, Sadayoshi is described as having used his official status to bring along a large group of his own private agents, and that he had been raiding the countryside. Under the excuse of collecting 'war rice,' he treated the local people with extreme cruelty, which the Azuma Kagami calls the 'torture of water and fire'. In order to escape such punishment, Takanao eventually surrendered. This brought the Chinzei Rebellion to a temporary halt, but the rebellion weakened the Taira clan's base of control in Chinzei.

== Aftermath ==
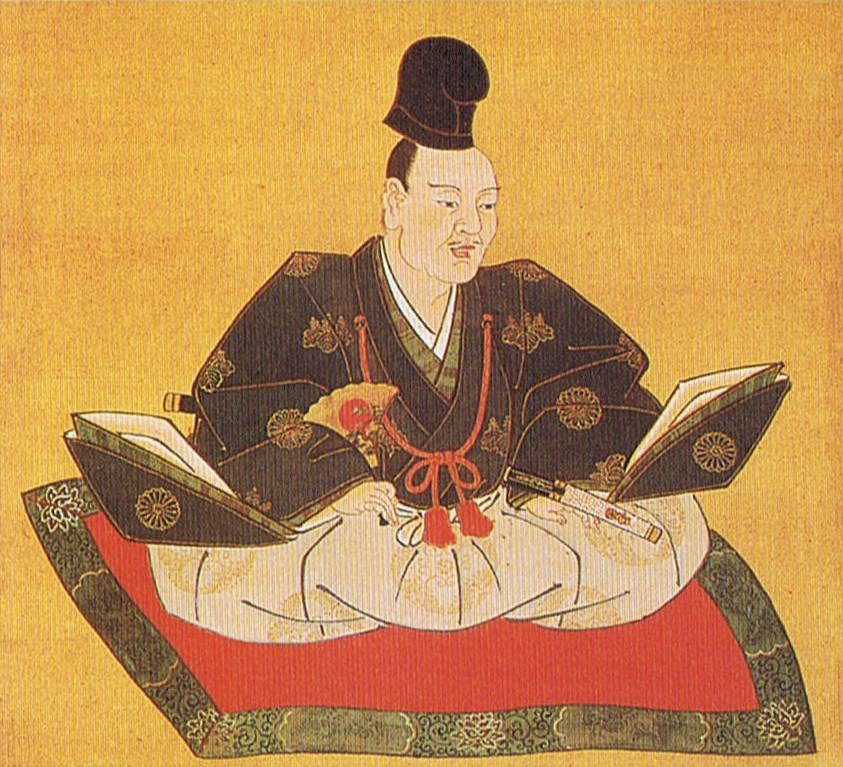
Minamoto no Yoshinaka

After Kikuchi Takanori surrendered, Taira no Sadayoshi remained in Kyushu. However, when Minamoto no Yoshinaka showed signs of advancing on the capital in 1183, Sadayoshi marched toward Kyoto with the forces he had used to subdued in the Chinzei region. Afterwards, the Taira clan fled the capital, and their initial destination was Kyushu. Once they arrived, Kikuchi Takanao, who had been now working with the Taira since turning himself in, and traveled with them from the capital, abandoned them. He used the excuse that he was going ahead to clear a path, but instead, he went to his own fortress in Higo province and ignored all orders to return. However, many of the powerful clans in the western provinces, which Sadayoshi had supposedly subdued, were uncooperative or hostile towards the fleeing Taira. Consequently, the Taira, who had initially landed in the western provinces, were driven out from there.

== Bibliography ==
- "吾妻鏡" [Azuma Kagami (Historical Chronicle)].
- "Heike Monogatari" [The Tale of the Heike] (PDF). Archived from the original (PDF) on 2010-08-07.
