= Oka Domain =

Administrative division in Japan during the Edo period (1601–1871)

Oka Domain 岡藩
- Domain of Japan
- 1594–1871
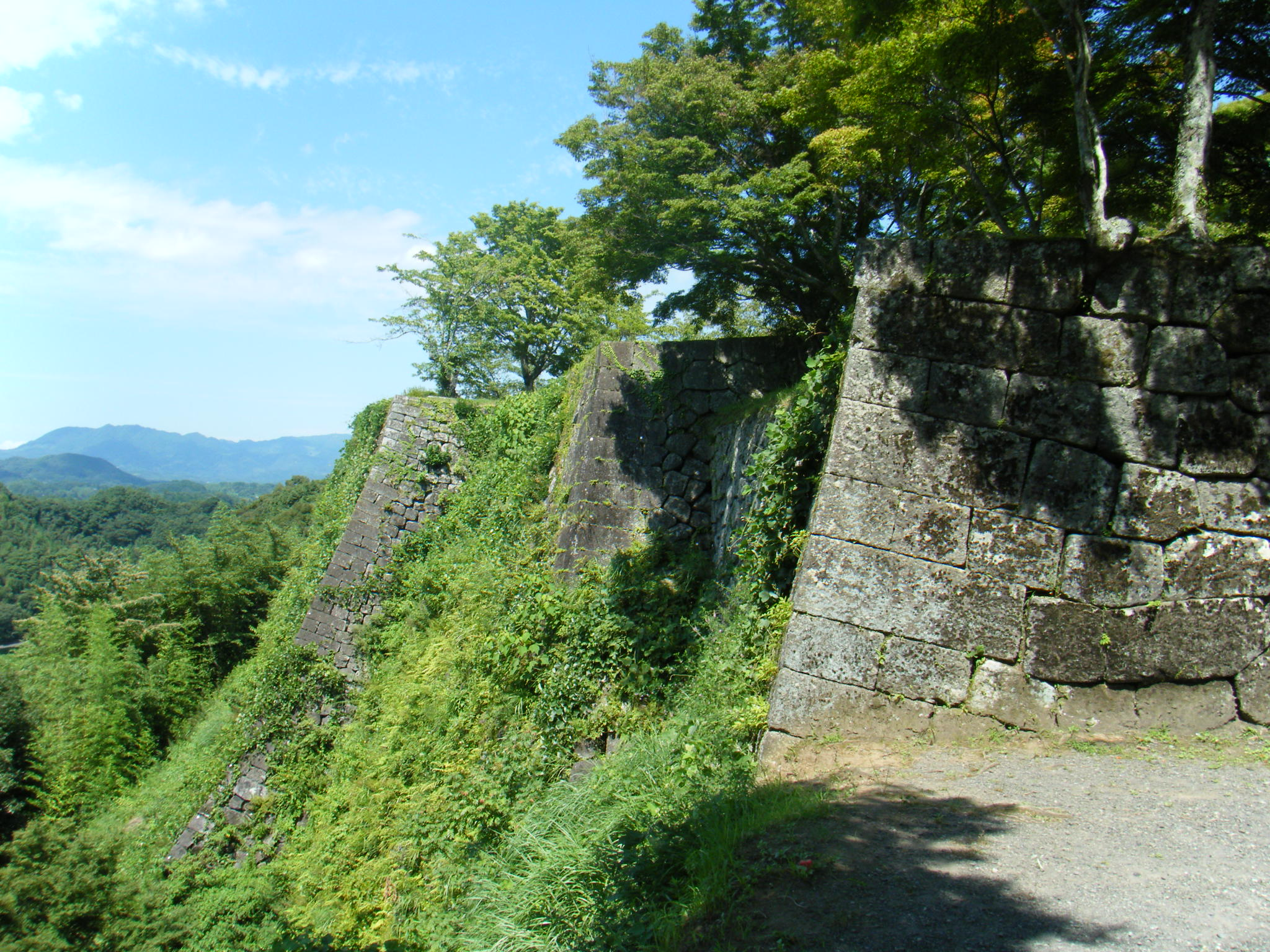
- Walls of Oka Castle

- Mon of the Nakagawa clan
- Capital: Oka Castle
- Area
  - Coordinates: 32°58′9.18″N 131°24′29.05″E
- Historical era: Edo period
  - Established: 1594
  - Abolition of the han system: 1871
- Contained within
  - Province: Bungo Province
- Today part of: Oita Prefecture

Location of Oka Castle
Oka Domain (Japan)

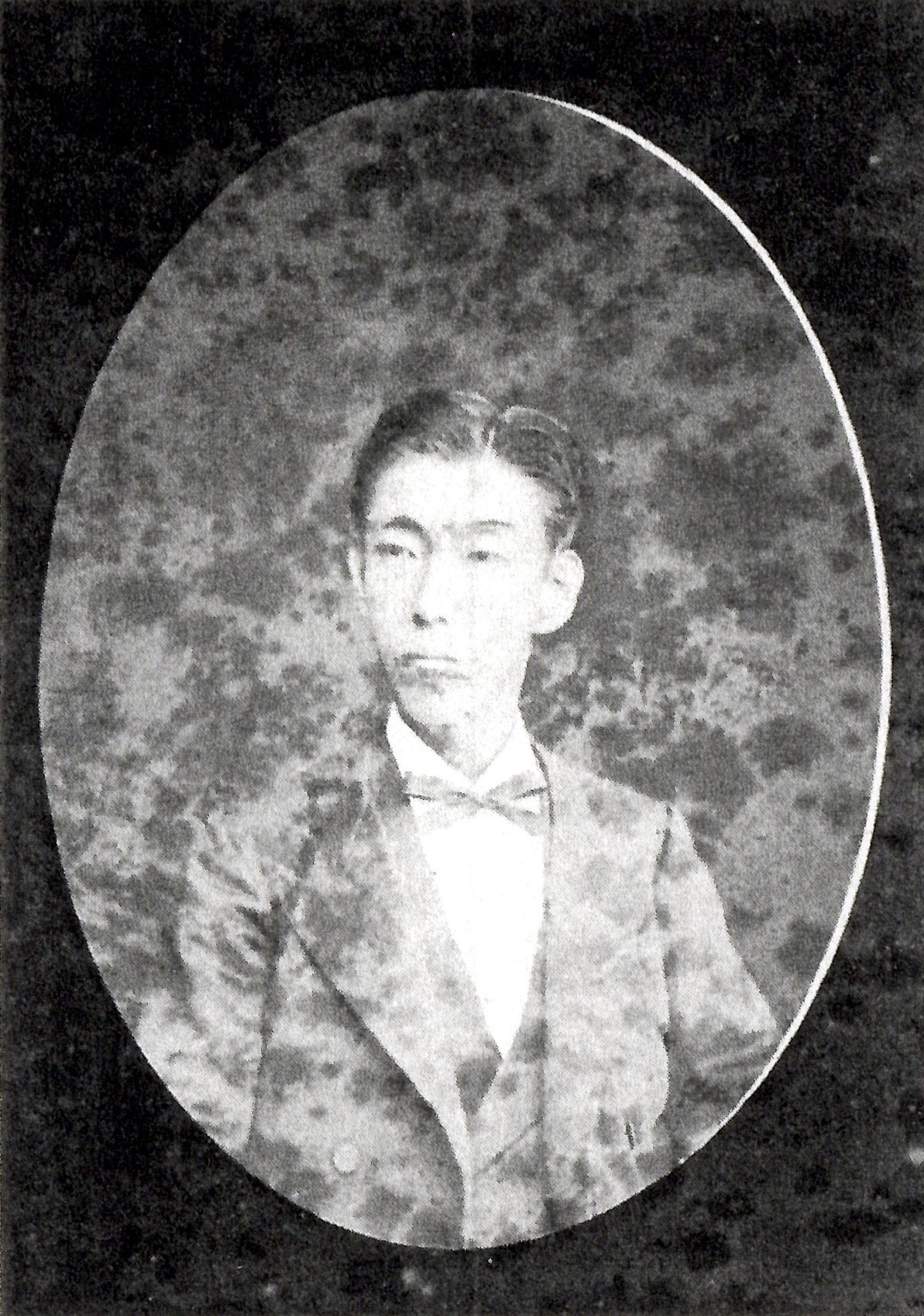
Nakagawa Hisanari, final daimyō of Oka Domain

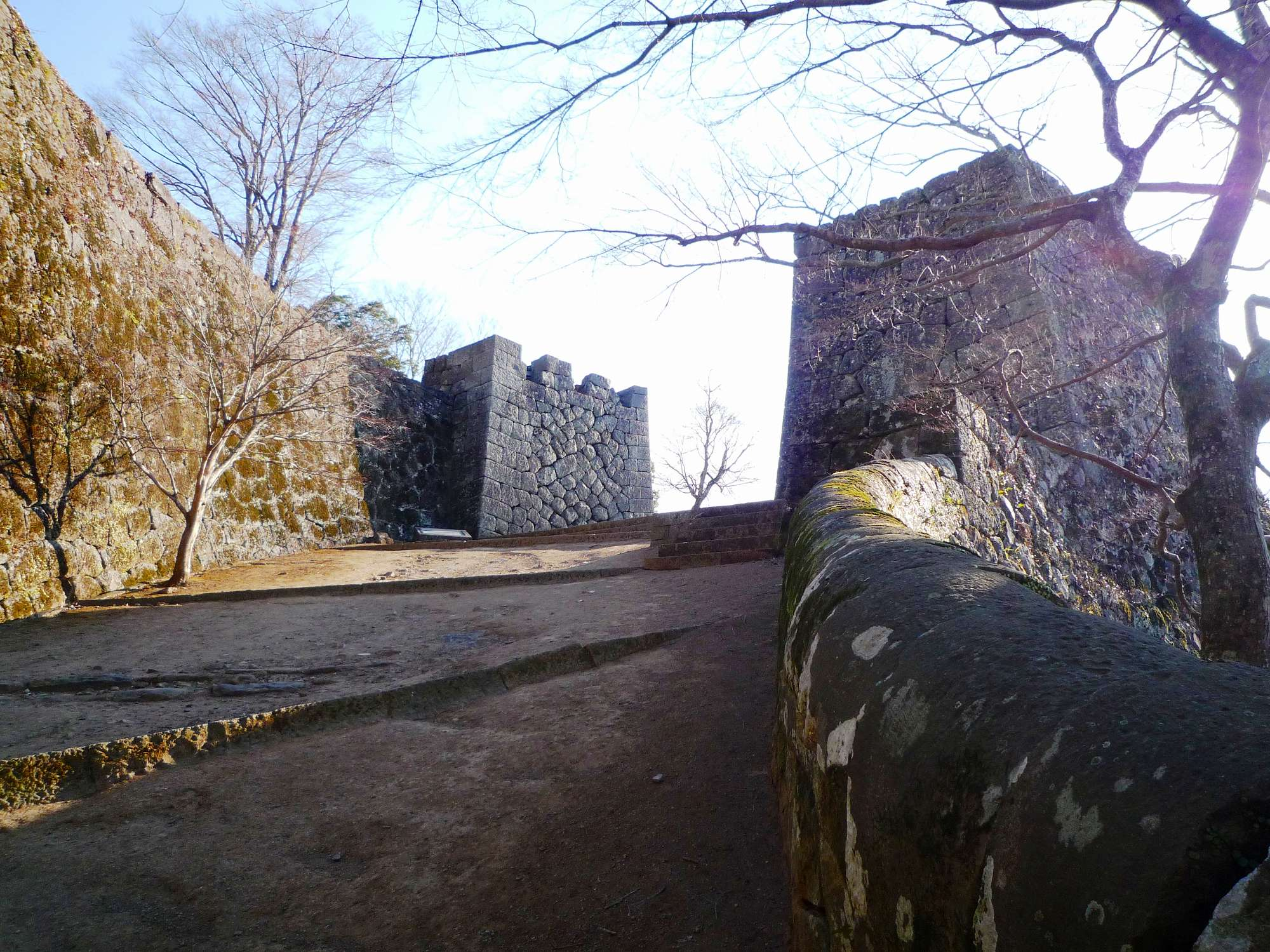
Ruins of the main gate of Oka Castle

Oka Domain (岡藩, Oka-han) was a feudal domain under the Tokugawa shogunate of Edo period Japan, in what is now central Ōita Prefecture. It was centered around Oka Castle in what is now the city of Taketa, Ōita and was ruled by the tozama daimyō Nakagawa clan for all of its history. It had the largest kokudaka of any domain in former Bungo Province. It was also sometimes referred to as Takata Domain (竹田藩, Takata-han)

== History ==
Oka Domain was founded by Nakagawa Hidenari, the son of Nakagawa Kiyohide, who had served Oda Nobunaga and Toyotomi Hideyoshi, and who had been awarded a 40,000 koku estate centered at Miki Castle in Harima Province. In 1594 Toyotomi Hideyoshi reassigned him to a new estate in Bungo Province with an increase to 66,000 koku. Subsequent surveys reassessed the official kokudaka to 70,000 koku. During the Battle of Sekigahara in 1600, he remained loyal to the Eastern Army from the start of the campaign, and after the war, Tokugawa Ieyasu reconfirmed him in his existing holdings.Throughout the Edo period, the Nakagawa clan continued to rule Oka for 13 generations, without any transfer or reduction of territory.

The third daimyō, Nakagawa Hisakiyo, invited the noted scholar Kumazawa Banzan to provide guidance on irrigation projects, increasing the wealth of domain and strengthening its military. The eighth daimyō, Nakagawa Hisasada, established the han school "Yugakukan", a martial arts school, "Keibukan", and a medical training school, "Hakusaikan".

During the Bakumatsu period, the samurai of Oka Domain strongly supported sonnō jōi, however, the 12th daimyō, Nakagawa Hisaaki had been adopted from the Tōdō clan, a strongly pro-Tokugawa clan, and expelled seven of the ringleaders from Oka Domain. Despite later appeals to change his position, Hisaaki remained neutral in the conflict, citing damage to the domain from large fires and windstorms and torrential rain, which placed the domain's finances in dire straits. Following the Meiji restoration in 1871, the domain became Oka Prefecture due to the abolition of the han system, and was later incorporated into Ōita Prefecture. The Nakagawa clan was elevated to the kazoku peerage with the title of count in 1884.

The noted late Edo Period painter Tanomura Chikuden, was from Oka Domain.

== Holdings at the end of the Edo period ==
As with most domains in the han system, Oka Domain consisted of several discontinuous territories calculated to provide the assigned kokudaka, based on periodic cadastral surveys and projected agricultural yields.

- Bungo Province
  - 5 villages in Ōita District
  - 292 villages in Ōno District
  - 285 villages in Naoiri District

== List of daimyō ==
#	Name	Tenure	Courtesy title	Court Rank	kokudaka
Nakagawa clan, 1594–1871 (Tozama)
1	Nakagawa Hideshige (中川秀成)	1594–1612	<unknown>	<unknown>	70,000 koku
2	Nakagawa Hisamori (中川久盛)	1612–1651	Naizan-no-kami (内膳正)	Junior 5th Rank, Lower Grade (従五位下)	70,000 koku
3	Nakagawa Hisakiyo (中川久清)	1651–1666	Yamashiro-no-kami (山城守)	Junior 5th Rank, Lower Grade (従五位下)	70,000 koku
4	Nakagawa Hisatsune (中川久恒)	1666–1695	Sado-no-kami (佐渡守)	Junior 5th Rank, Lower Grade (従五位下)	70,000 koku
5	Nakagawa Hisamichi (中川久通)	1695–1710	Inaba-no-kami (因幡守)	Junior 5th Rank, Lower Grade (従五位下)	70,000 koku
6	Nakagawa Hisatada (中川久忠)	1710–1742	Naizen-no-kami (内膳正)	Junior 5th Rank, Lower Grade (従五位下)	70,000 koku
7	Nakagawa Hisayoshi (中川久慶)	1742–1743	Yamashiro-no-kami (山城守)	Junior 5th Rank, Lower Grade (従五位下)	70,000 koku
8	Nakagawa Hisasada (中川久貞)	1743–1790	Shuri-no-daibu (修理大夫)	Junior 5th Rank, Lower Grade (従五位下)	70,000 koku
9	Nakagawa Hisamochi (中川久持)	1790–1798	Shuri-no-daibu (修理大夫)	Junior 5th Rank, Lower Grade (従五位下)	70,000 koku
10	Nakagawa Hisataka (中川久貴)	1798–1815	Shuri-no-daibu (修理大夫)	Junior 5th Rank, Lower Grade (従五位下)	70,000 koku
11	Nakagawa Hisanori (中川久教)	1815–1840	Shuri-no-daibu (修理大夫)	Junior 5th Rank, Lower Grade (従五位下)	70,000 koku
12	Nakagawa Hisaaki (中川久昭)	1840–1869	Sado-no-kami (佐渡守)	Junior 5th Rank, Lower Grade (従五位下)	70,000 koku
13	Nakagawa Hisanari (木下俊敦)	1869–1871	Naizen-no-kami (内膳正)	Junior 5th Rank, Lower Grade (従五位下)	70,000 koku

== See also ==
- List of Han
- Abolition of the han system
