= Takanao =

- Gender: Male

Origin
- Origin: Japanese
- Meaning: Different meanings depending on the kanji used

Takanao (written: 孝尚 or 隆直) is a masculine Japanese given name. Notable people with the name include:

- Kikuchi Takanao (菊池 隆直; died 1185), Japanese samurai
- Takanao Sato (佐藤 孝尚; born 1933), Japanese water polo player
