= Ogata clan =

Japanese samurai clan

The Ogata clan of Bungo (豊後の緒方氏) was established by Ogata no Saburo Koreyoshi in 1174 as a samurai clan. The clan lived in Bungo Province, now Ōita Prefecture. The family's main recorded history dates to The Tale of the Heike and "Okuninushi no Mikoto" which explains the legend and history of Ogata no Saburo Koreyoshi.

== First English version ==
Helen McCullough translated the first English version of The Tale of the Heike which gives the first historical recording of Ogata no Saburo Koreyoshi and his role in the Minamoto's taking control of early Japan. Dawson and de Benneville's works also explain the historical recordings of the first Ogata clan from Bungo.

== First shōgun ==
The Ogata clan helped establish Oka Castle and helped solidify the region with the forces that Ogata no Saburo Koreyoshi commanded.

== Late history ==
Japanese history books do not record the Ogata clan's quick rise and fall in a role that helped the Kamakura period to be established. Ogata clan descendants remained samurai until the last battles of the Meiji Restoration. The last recorded samurai of the Ogata clan was Ogata Shuntaro, who was MIA. Ogata Masanori of Tokyo, who was originally raised in Kumamoto, Japan, traced the lineage of the Ogata clan back to the 1170s. His cousin, historian Sheldon T. Ogata, completed the research of the Ogata family in 2008–2010, tracing back to Ogata no Saburo Koreyoshi. The first Ogata clan was established in Bungo, Japan. Many of Ogata no Saburo Koreyoshi's descendants have the same kanji and writings as his last name and can be found in Fukuoka and Kumamoto, Japan. Many of his descendants now live in Hawaii, California, Brazil, and Georgia.
