= Saihō-ji (disambiguation) =

Saihō-ji (西芳寺 and 西方寺) Temples in Japan.

== Saihō-ji (西芳寺) temples ==
- Saihō-ji (Kyoto) - Rinzai-shū - World Heritage Site

== Saihō-ji (西方寺) temples ==
- Saihō-ji (Tokiwadeguchi-chō, Ukyō-ku, Kyoto) - Jōdokyō
- Saihō-ji (Nishikyōgokukitaura-chō, Ukyō-ku, Kyoto)
- Saihō-ji (Gōno-chō, Shimogyō-ku, Kyoto)
- Saihō-ji (Shijo Ōmiya-chō, Shimogyō-ku, Kyoto)
- Saihō-ji (Daigo Nakayama-chō, Fushimi-ku, Kyoto)
- Saihō-ji (Hazukashi Furukawa-chō, Fushimi-ku, Kyoto)
- Saihō-ji (Furoya-machi, Fushimi-ku, Kyoto)
- Saihō-ji (Kita-ku, Kyoto)
- Saihō-ji (Nara)
- Saihō-ji (Sendai)
- Saihō-ji (Kiryu)
- Saihō-ji (Takaoka)
- Saihō-ji (Nagano)
- Saihō-ji (Hekinan)
- Saihō-ji (Kurume)
- Saihō-ji (Sasebo)
- Saihō-ji (Gotō)
- Saihō-ji (Kanoya)
- Saihō-ji (Satsumasendai)
- Saihō-ji (Tokyo)
- Saihō-ji (Kashiwa)
- Saihō-ji (Takehara)
