= Nanatsumori Kofun Cluster =

Nanatsu Kofun cluster
- 七ツ森古墳群 (Japanese)
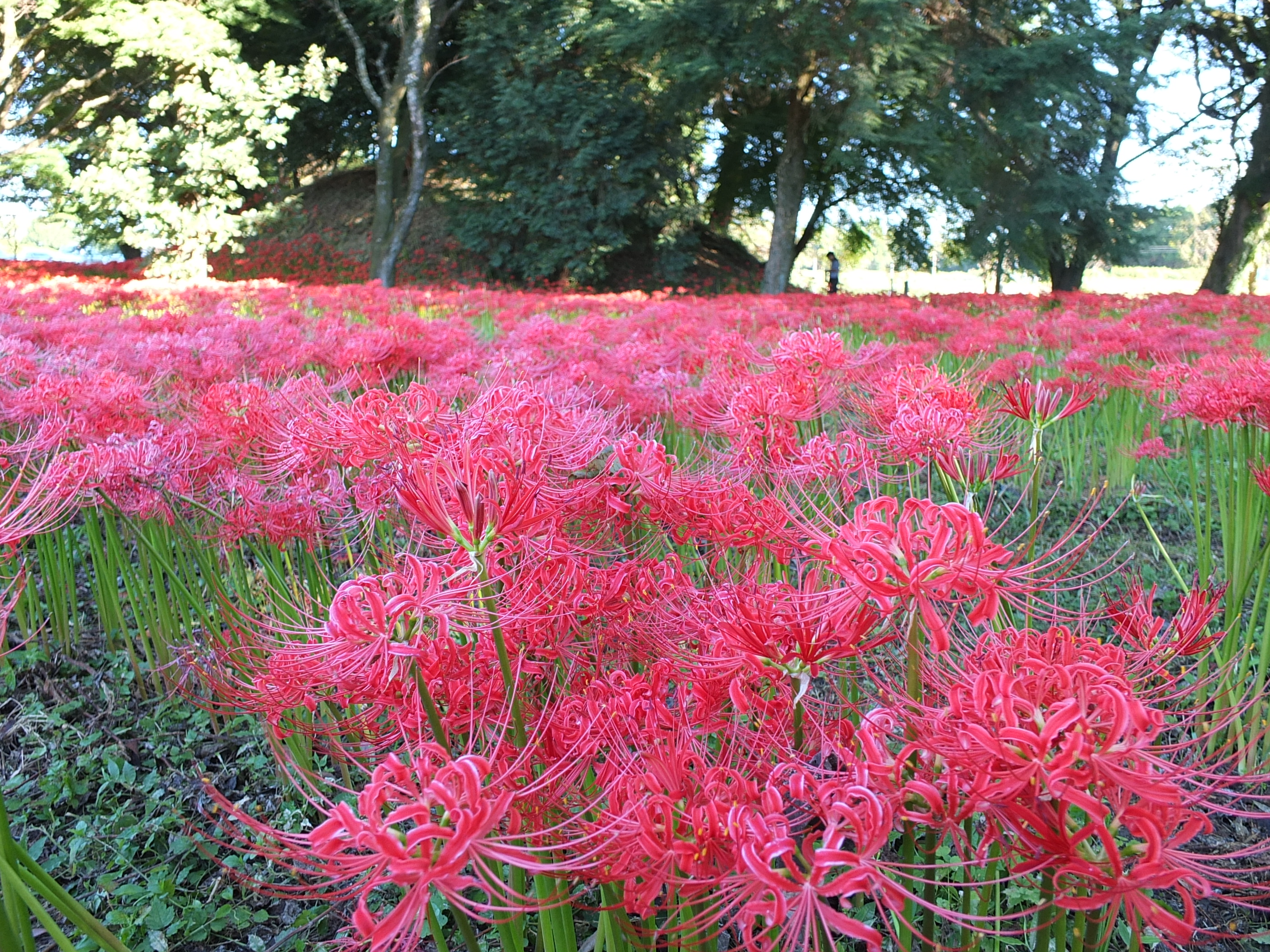
- Nanatsu Kofun cluster

- Nanatsu Kofun cluster Nanatsumori Kofun Cluster (Japan)
- Interactive map of Nanatsu Kofun cluster
- 32°57′6.8″N 131°18′36.3″E
- Type: Kofun custer
- Periods: early Kofun period
- Location: Taketa, Ōita, Japan
- Region: Kyushu

History
- Built: c.4th century

Site notes
- Public access: Yes (no facilities)

Nanatsu Kofun Cluster (七ツ森古墳群) is a group Kofun period burial mounds, located in the Sugou neighborhood of the city of Taketa, Ōita, on the island of Kyushu Japan. The tumuli were collectively designated a National Historic Site of Japan in 1959.

== Overview ==
The Nanatsu Kofun cluster is located along Japan National Route 57 on a plateau in western part of Taketa City. It is believed that there were originally seven tumuli as the name suggests, but the only ones that remain today are two round tumuli (Kofun A and D) and two keyhole-shaped tumuli (Kofun B and C).

Kofun A, located furthest west, is a round enpun (円墳)-style tumulus with a diameter of 20 meters and a height of four meters.The excavated boat-shaped sarcophagus is 80 cm long and 25 cm wide and has small stone pillows, so it is thought that the tomb was for infant who had just been born.

Kofun B is a zenpō-kōen-fun (前方後円墳), which is shaped like a keyhole, having one square end and one circular end, when viewed from above. It has a total length of 51 meters, with a posterior circle diameter of 28 meters, height of six meters, and an anterior section with a width of eight meters and a height of three meters. A combination-style sarcophagus was discovered in the center of the posterior circular portion, containing the remains of two men and a woman. Grave goods found in Kofun B and C included six bronze mirrors, magatama beads, jasper stone pieces, and dear antler-shaped swords. The jasper pieces were found to be parts of a stone chime, possibly a bianqing, which had been purposely crushed and its fragments scattered near the remains. Based on the shape of the tumulus, the structure of the sarcophagus, and the excavated items, it is estimated to be the oldest Kinai-style tumulus in the region, built in the early Kofun period.

The site is now a park noted for its large profusion of red spider lilies in fall. It is located approximately 20 minutes by car from Bungo-Taketa Station on the JR Kyushu Hōhi Main Line.

== See also ==
- List of Historic Sites of Japan (Ōita)
