= Kujū, Ōita =

Former town in southern Japan

Kujū (久住町, Kuju-machi) was a town located in Naoiri District, Ōita Prefecture, Japan.

As of 2003, the town had an estimated population of 4,686 and a density of 32.84 persons per km^{2}. The total area was 142.69 km^{2}.

On April 1, 2005, Kujū, along with the towns of Naoiri and Ogi (all from Naoiri District), was merged into the expanded city of Taketa.

In addition to being a tourist destination, beef, strawberries, rice and mushrooms are produced locally by small scale farmers. Mount Kujū is a popular local destination for hiking and in the spring, there are abundant pink flowering shrubs (miayama kirishima). Hikers may use the Bogatsuru (坊がつる) campsite free of charge. The surrounding areas have many onsen or natural hot springs. Kujū also has a flower park, which sells lavender ice cream.

Many families in Kujū still live a traditional Japanese lifestyle, with extended families living together, houses with real shoji - rice paper sliding doors and tatami mats, and people eating rice, fish and miso soup for breakfast. Kujū is also home to TAO, one of Japan's foremost taiko groups, and Kudami Taiko, an all women taiko group.
