= Naoiri, Ōita =

Dissolved municipality in Naoiri district, Ōita prefecture, Japan

Naoiri (直入町, Naoiri-machi) was a town located in Naoiri District, Ōita Prefecture, Japan.

As of 2003, the town had an estimated population of 2,816 and the density of 33.59 persons per km^{2}. The total area was 83.83 km^{2}.

On April 1, 2005, Naoiri, along with the towns of Kujū and Ogi (all from Naoiri District), was merged into the expanded city of Taketa.
