= Sadayoshi =

- Gender: Male

Origin
- Origin: Japanese
- Meaning: Different meanings depending on the kanji used

Sadayoshi (written: 定義, 定良 or 貞義) is a masculine Japanese given name. Notable people with the name include:

- Sadayoshi Fukuda (福田 定良; 1917–2002), Japanese philosopher, writer and critic
- Sadayoshi Fujimoto (藤本定義; 1904–1981), Japanese baseball manager
- Sadayoshi Kobayashi (小林 定義; 1905–?), Japanese field hockey player
- Taira no Sadayoshi (平 貞義), Japanese samurai
- Sadayoshi Tanabe (田辺 定義; 1888–2000), Japanese academic
- Sadayoshi Yamada (山田 定義; 1892–1971), Imperial Japanese Navy admiral
