= Taketa =

Taketa 竹田市
- City
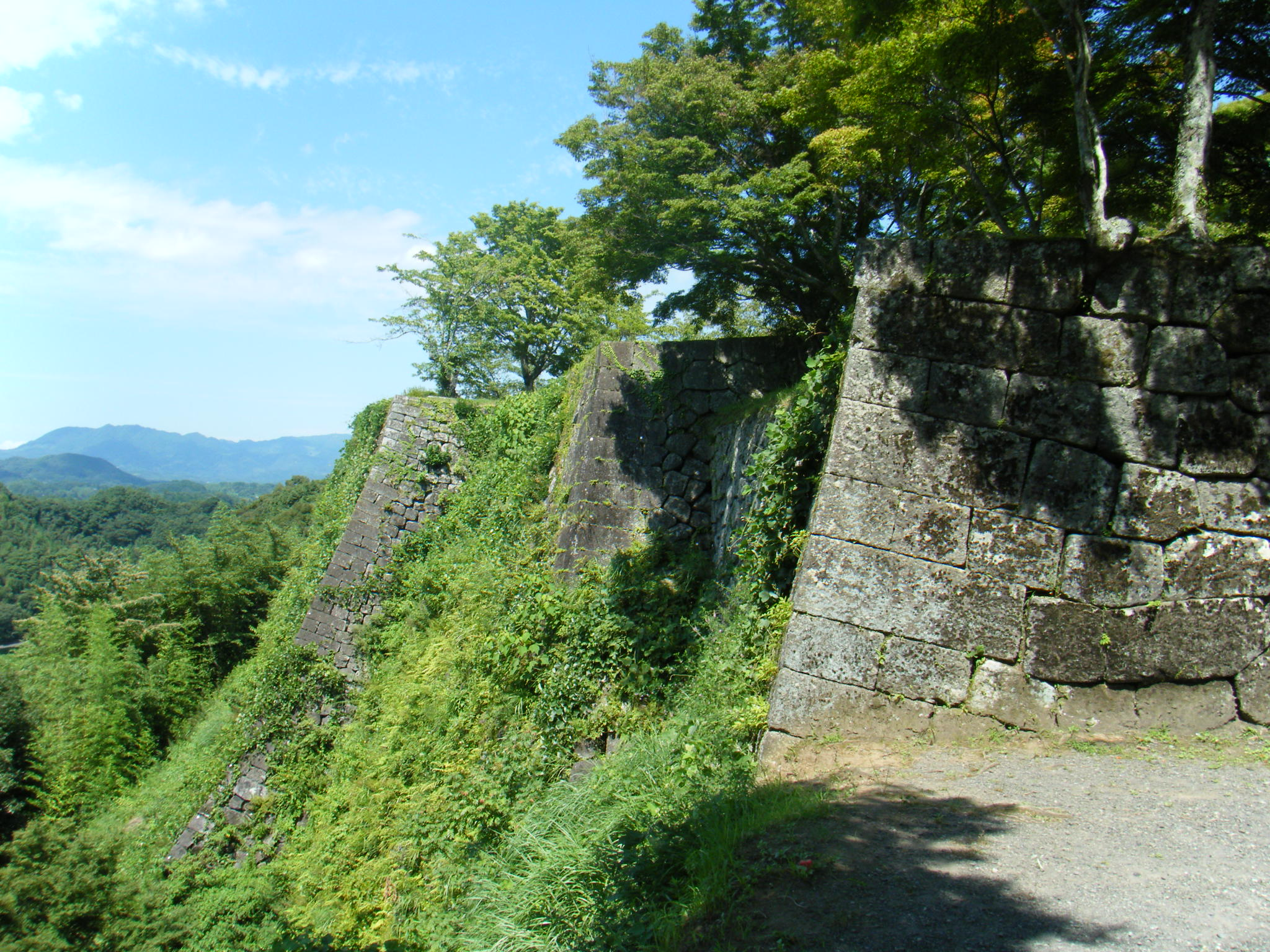
- Oka Castle

- Flag Seal
- /0/queryThe property query is required; /0/idsThe property ids is required; /0Failed to match at least one schema; /0/titleThe property title is required; /0/serviceDoes not have a value in the enumeration ["page"]; /0Failed to match exactly one schema; /0/geometriesThe property geometries is required; /0/typeDoes not have a value in the enumeration ["GeometryCollection"]; /0/typeDoes not have a value in the enumeration ["MultiPolygon"]; /0/typeDoes not have a value in the enumeration ["Point"]; /0/typeDoes not have a value in the enumeration ["MultiPoint"]; /0/typeDoes not have a value in the enumeration ["LineString"]; /0/typeDoes not have a value in the enumeration ["MultiLineString"]; /0/typeDoes not have a value in the enumeration ["Polygon"]; /0/coordinatesThe property coordinates is required; /0/geometryThe property geometry is required; /0/typeDoes not have a value in the enumeration ["Feature"]; /0/featuresThe property features is required; /0/typeDoes not have a value in the enumeration ["FeatureCollection"]; Location of Taketa in Ōita Prefecture

- Location in Japan
- Coordinates: 32°58′25″N 131°23′52″E
- Country: Japan
- Region: Kyushu
- Prefecture: Ōita

Government
  - Mayor: Masahiro Doi (since April 2021)

Area
  - Total: 477.53 km^{2} (184.38 sq mi)

Population (November 30, 2023)
  - Total: 19,456
  - Density: 40.743/km^{2} (105.52/sq mi)
- Time zone: UTC+09:00 (JST)
- City hall address: Oji-Aiai 1650, Taketa-shi, Ōita-ken 878-8555
- Climate: Cfa
- Website: Official website
- Symbols
- Bird: Cettia diphone
- Flower: Kyushu Azelea
- Tree: Maple

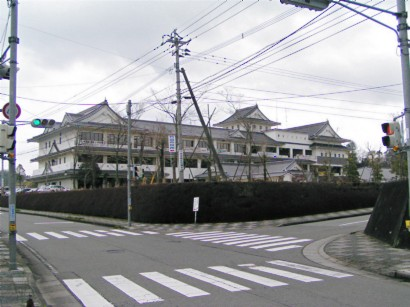
Taketa City Hall

Taketa (竹田市, Taketa-shi) is a city located in Ōita Prefecture, Japan. As of 3 November 2023, the city had an estimated population of 19,456 in 9838 households, and a population density of 41 persons per km^{2}. The total area of the city is 477.53 km^{2} (184.38 sq mi).

== Geography ==
Taketa is located in the southwestern part of Ōita Prefecture. The city center is approximately 55 km southwest of the prefectural capital at Ōita City and approximately 73 km east-northeast of Kumamoto City. The city is surrounded by mountains reaching heights of approximately 1 km, such as the Kujū Mountain Range, Mount Aso, Mount Sobo, and Mt. Takayama, and natural beauty spots include Takeda Springs and Kujū Plateau. Together with Bungo-Ōno City, which adjoins it to the east, it is known as the "Hōhi district" (or "Oku-Bungo"). Although Taketa borders Miyazaki Prefecture to the south, there is no direct road connection to Miyazaki from Taketa.

=== Neighboring municipalities ===
Kumamoto Prefecture

- Aso
- Minamioguni
- Takamori
- Ubuyama

Miyazaki Prefecture

- Takachiho

Ōita Prefecture

- Bungo-Ōno
- Kokonoe
- Ōita
- Yufu

=== Climate ===
Taketa has a humid subtropical climate (Köppen climate classification Cfa) with hot summers and cool winters. Precipitation is significant throughout the year, but is somewhat lower in winter. The average annual temperature in Taketa is 14.7 °C (58.5 °F). The average annual rainfall is 1,885.3 mm (74.22 in) and June is the wettest month. The temperatures are highest on average in August, at around 25.7 °C (78.3 °F), and lowest in January, at around 3.9 °C (39.0 °F). The highest temperature ever recorded in Taketa was 38.5 °C (101.3 °F) on 1 August 2026; the coldest temperature ever recorded was −8.6 °C (16.5 °F) on 10 February 1984.

Climate data for Taketa (1991−2020 normals, extremes 1977−present)
Month	Jan	Feb	Mar	Apr	May	Jun	Jul	Aug	Sep	Oct	Nov	Dec	Year
Record high °C (°F)	20.8 (69.4)	25.0 (77.0)	28.0 (82.4)	29.8 (85.6)	35.0 (95.0)	34.7 (94.5)	37.2 (99.0)	38.5 (101.3)	35.6 (96.1)	31.7 (89.1)	27.3 (81.1)	23.5 (74.3)	38.5 (101.3)
Mean daily maximum °C (°F)	9.0 (48.2)	10.6 (51.1)	14.4 (57.9)	19.9 (67.8)	24.3 (75.7)	26.1 (79.0)	30.4 (86.7)	31.1 (88.0)	27.2 (81.0)	22.1 (71.8)	16.8 (62.2)	11.3 (52.3)	20.3 (68.5)
Daily mean °C (°F)	3.9 (39.0)	5.0 (41.0)	8.4 (47.1)	13.6 (56.5)	18.2 (64.8)	21.3 (70.3)	25.4 (77.7)	25.7 (78.3)	22.0 (71.6)	16.5 (61.7)	11.0 (51.8)	5.8 (42.4)	14.7 (58.5)
Mean daily minimum °C (°F)	−0.9 (30.4)	−0.3 (31.5)	2.7 (36.9)	7.5 (45.5)	12.6 (54.7)	17.4 (63.3)	21.7 (71.1)	21.7 (71.1)	17.9 (64.2)	11.5 (52.7)	5.6 (42.1)	0.7 (33.3)	9.8 (49.7)
Record low °C (°F)	−8.4 (16.9)	−8.6 (16.5)	−7.2 (19.0)	−3.2 (26.2)	1.2 (34.2)	7.7 (45.9)	12.1 (53.8)	13.8 (56.8)	5.5 (41.9)	0.2 (32.4)	−3.4 (25.9)	−8.2 (17.2)	−8.6 (16.5)
Average precipitation mm (inches)	48.1 (1.89)	67.4 (2.65)	103.6 (4.08)	117.7 (4.63)	147.8 (5.82)	364.9 (14.37)	309.7 (12.19)	221.0 (8.70)	268.6 (10.57)	124.1 (4.89)	67.6 (2.66)	45.0 (1.77)	1,885.3 (74.22)
Average precipitation days (≥ 1.0 mm)	5.8	7.9	10.1	10.0	9.8	15.0	13.1	11.8	10.9	7.4	6.9	5.8	114.5
Mean monthly sunshine hours	159.9	151.3	170.3	188.1	194.9	131.7	174.2	193.5	144.8	165.6	153.8	160.6	1,988.6
Source: Japan Meteorological Agency

=== Demographics ===
Per Japanese census data, the population of Taketa in 2020 is 20,332 people. Taketa has been conducting censuses since 1920.

Historical population
Year	Pop.	±%
1960	56,889	—
1965	49,308	−13.3%
1970	42,873	−13.1%
1975	38,359	−10.5%
1980	36,011	−6.1%
1985	34,693	−3.7%
1990	32,398	−6.6%
1995	30,368	−6.3%
2000	28,689	−5.5%
2005	26,534	−7.5%
2010	24,361	−8.2%
2015	22,332	−8.3%
2020	20,332	−9.0%
Taketa population statistics

== History ==
The area of Taketa was part of ancient Bungo Province and roughly corresponds to Naoiri District, one of the eight counties of Bungo mentioned in the Nara period Bungo no Kuni Fudoki. During the Edo period it developed as the castle town of Oka Domain and was ruled by the Nakagawa clan until the Meiji restoration. Following the Meiji restoration, the town of Saeki within Naoiri District, Ōita was established on May 1, 1889 with the creation of the modern municipalities system. The city was founded on 31 March 1954. On 1 April 2005, the towns of Kujū, Naoiri and Ogi (all from Naoiri District) were also merged into Taketa.

== Government ==
Taketa has a mayor-council form of government with a directly elected mayor and a unicameral city council of 15 members. Taketa contributes one member to the Ōita Prefectural Assembly. In terms of national politics, the city is part of the Ōita 2nd district of the lower house of the Diet of Japan.

== Economy ==
The economy of Taketa is centered around agriculture and forestry. The main crops are kabosu, shiitake, tomatoes and sweet corn.

== Education ==
Takata has 11 public elementary schools and four public junior high schools operated by the city government. The city has two public high schools operated by the Ōita Prefectural Board of Education and one private high school. The prefecture operates one special education school for students with disabilities.

== Transportation ==
=== Railways ===
JR Kyushu - Hōhi Main Line

- Bungo-Ogi - Tamarai - Bungo-Taketa

=== Highways ===
- National Route 57
- National Route 442
- National Route 502

== Sister cities ==
- San Lorenzo, Paraguay, sister city since October 1973
- Bad Krozingen, Baden-Württemberg, Germany, sister city since October 2004
- Tianliao District, Kaohsiung City, Taiwan, sister city since January 2017

== Local attractions ==
- Nanatsumori Kofun Cluster, National Historic Site.
- Oka Castle ruins is a famous local National Historic Site.
- former home of Tanomura Chikuden, National Historic Site.

== Traditional crafts ==
Princess Daruma dolls (姫だるま, Hime Daruma) were first created and remain a popular local craft in Taketa.

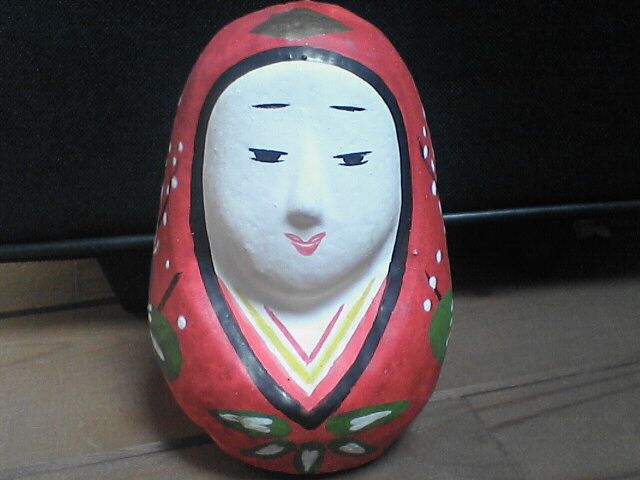
Taketa Princess Daruma Doll

== Notable people from Taketa ==
- Iwao Akiyama, former woodblock printmaker
- Korechika Anami, former general in the Imperial Japanese Army during World War II
- Kenji Anan, stage and film actor
- Takeo Hirose, former career officer in the Imperial Japanese Navy
- Otoya Kawano, Japanese voice actor
