= Ogi, Ōita =

Former town in southern Japan

Ogi (荻町, Ogi-machi) was a town located in Naoiri District, Ōita Prefecture, Japan.

== Population ==
As of 2003, the town had an estimated population of 3,454 and a density of 68.64 persons per km^{2}. The total area was 50.32 km^{2}.

== Merge ==
On April 1, 2005, Ogi, along with the towns of Kujū and Naoiri (all from Naoiri District), was merged into the expanded city of Taketa.
