= Saihō-ji (Sendai) =

Coordinates: 38.3651°N 140.6678°E

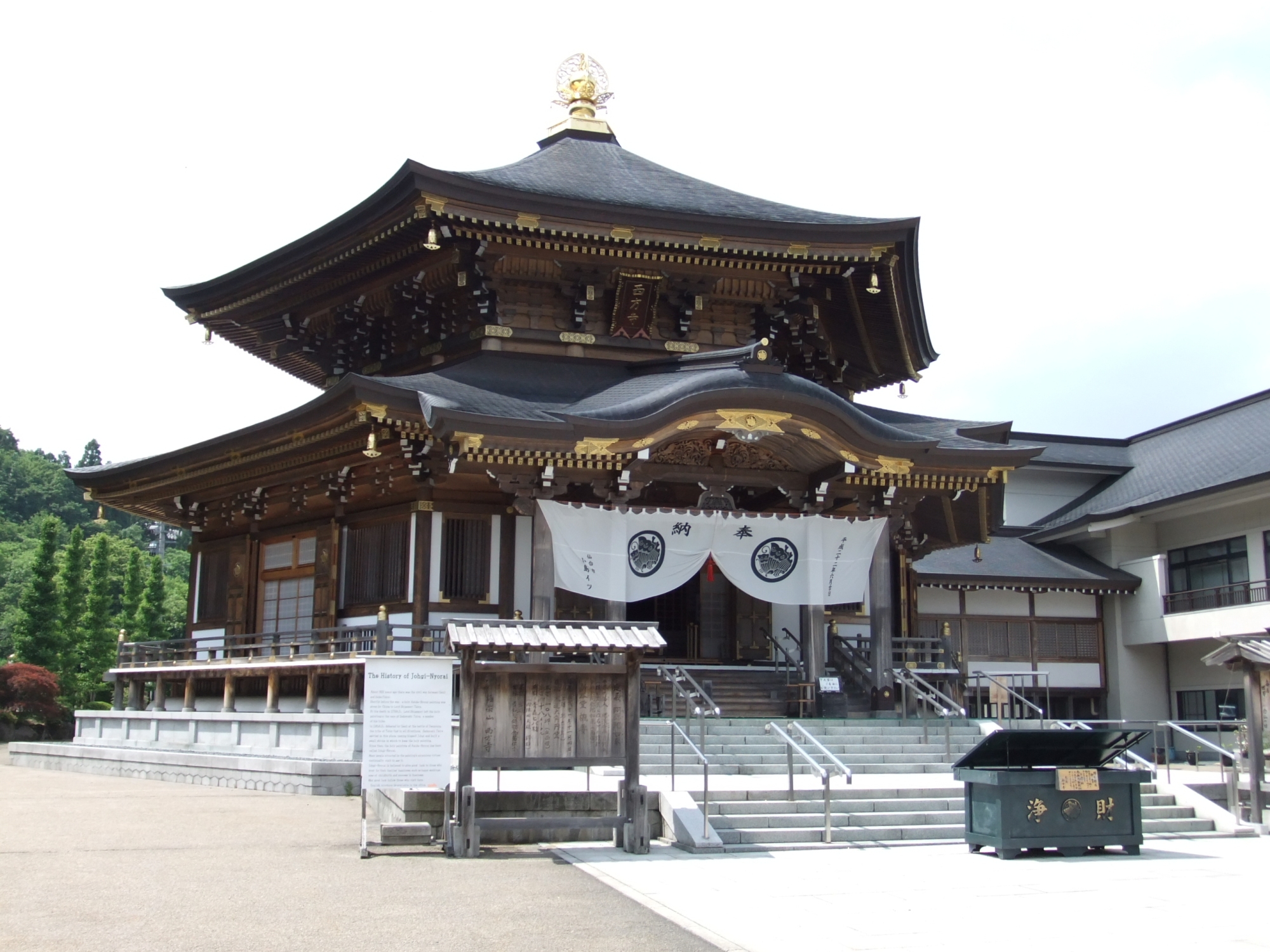
The main hall of the temple

Saihō-ji (西方寺) is a Buddhist temple built in 1706 belonging to the Jōdo-shū sect in Aoba-ku, Sendai, Miyagi Prefecture, Japan. It is rarely called by its formal name by locals, and is more often called Jogi Nyorai or Jogi-san.

== History ==
The temple's main treasure is a scroll depicting Amida Buddha, which is kept in the main temple. This scroll is called Jogi Nyorai.

The temple is said to have been the location of a Taira clan fugitive, who is said to have been hiding out here after the Battle of Dan-no-ura, when Taira no Sadayoshi, a senior vassal of Taira no Shigemori, enshrined the Amida Nyorai scroll and prayed for the repose of the souls of Emperor Antoku and the Taira clan. Eight hundred years ago, the belongings of the young Emperor Antoku, who died with the Taira clan in Dannoura Bay in 1185, were buried under trees on the temple grounds. Over the decades, the trees merged and grew together to form a single tree, which today is one of the important landmarks of Saihoji.

=== Timeline ===
- On July 7, 1198, Sadayoshi died at the age of 60, and in accordance with his will, his retainers built a small chapel over his grave and enshrined a scroll depicting Amida Buddha.
- In 1706, Genbei Hayasaka, a descendant of the vassal, became a monk, took the name Kanrensha Ryonen, and founded the temple as Gokurakuzan Saihō-ji.
- In 1927, a new mausoleum was completed, covering the old one located above Taira Sadayoshi's grave.
- The current bell tower was completed in 1930.
- The current temple gate was completed in 1931.
- On May 16, 1933, the Sendai Takanobu Sadayoshi group donated a temple bell.
- On October 6, 1986, the first five-story pagoda in Miyagi Prefecture was completed at this temple.
- In November 1999, the current main hall was completed and the principal image was moved there from the mausoleum (Teiyo Hall)

== Gallery ==
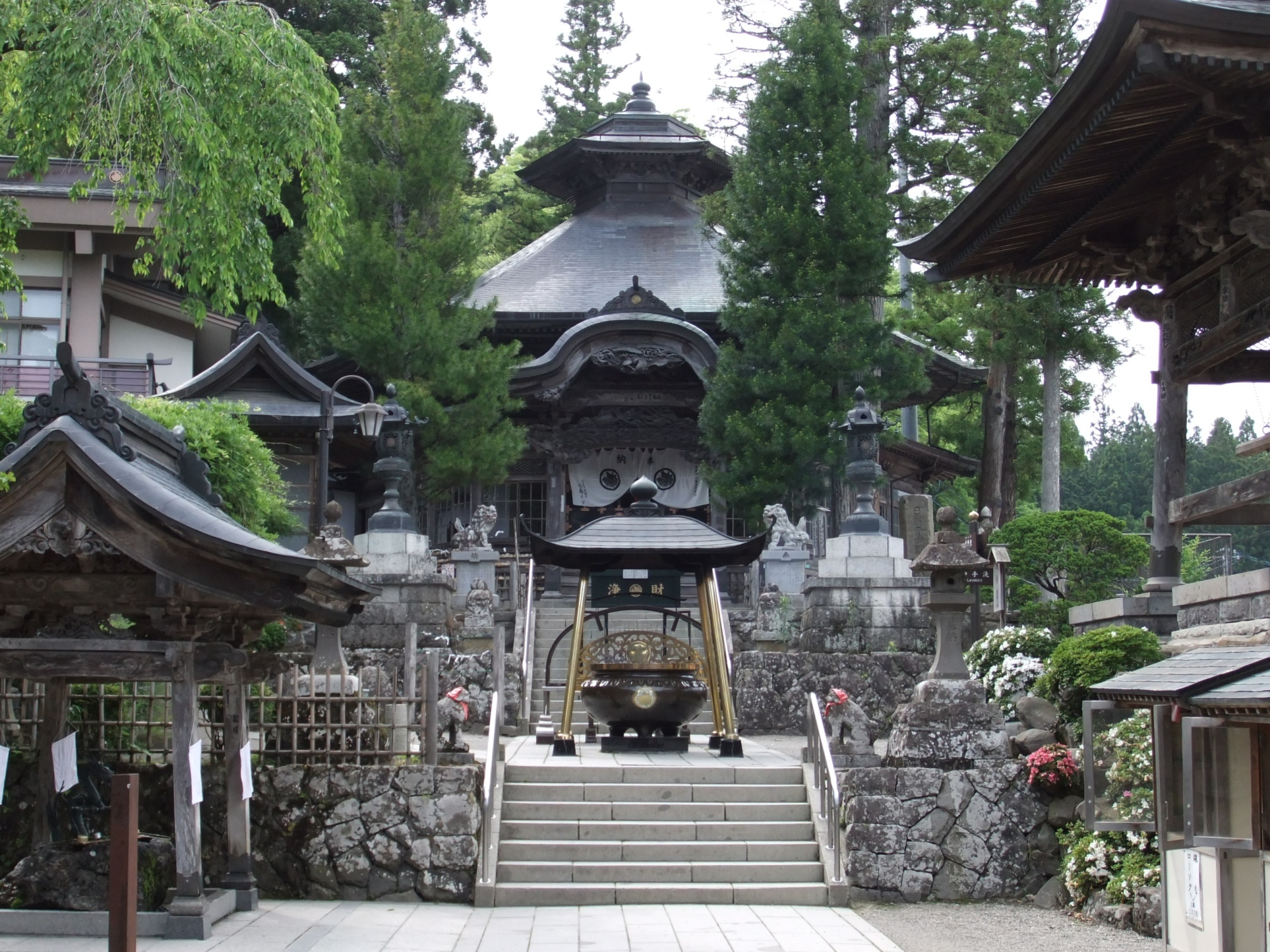
The mausoleum of Emperor Antoku

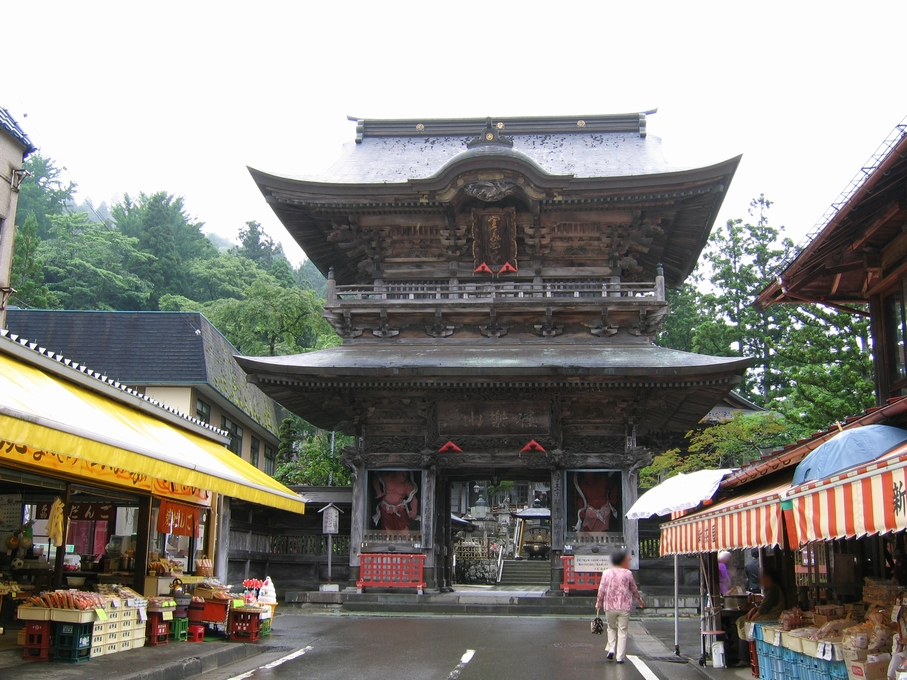
The Sanmon gate of the temple

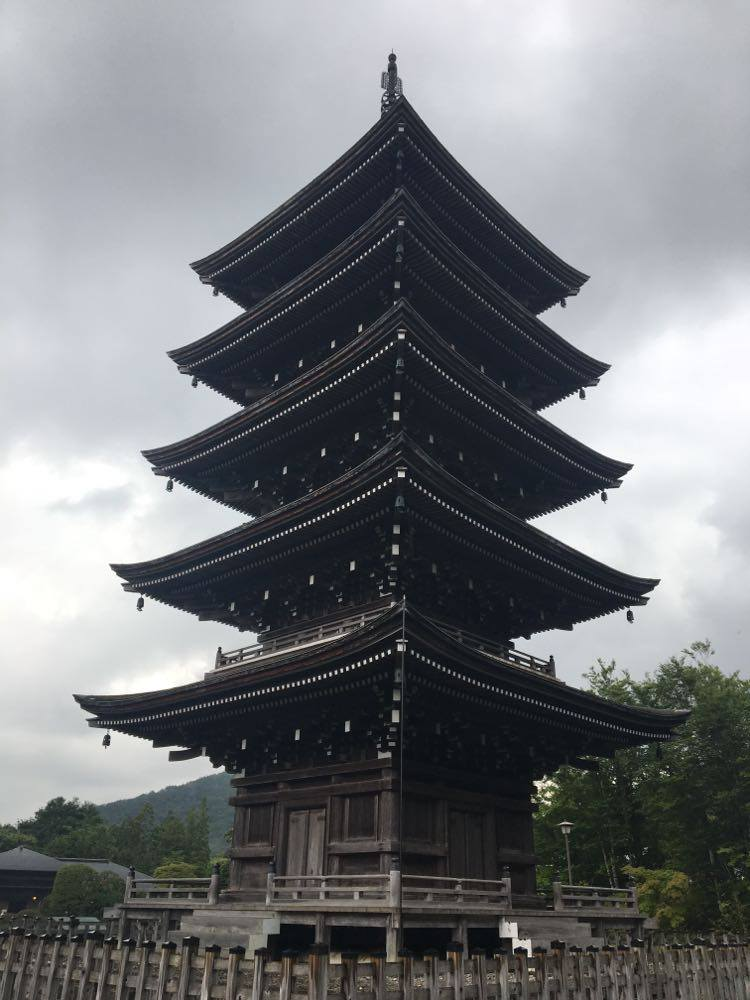
The temple's five-tiered pagoda
