= Ogata no Saburo Koreyoshi =

Ogata No Saburo Koreyoshi (緒方 惟栄), (around 1100 to 1200 AD) was a Japanese nobleman, warrior who played a major role in the establishment of the Kamakura shogunate.

The Tale of the Heike establish that Ogata commanded the largest armies on Kyūshū.

== Descent ==
According to the Okuninushi no Mikoto line of Shinto legends, Saburo's great-great-grandfather was Daida, and thus Saburo was descended from a snake god.

It is said that Daida's mother was visited each night by her lover. One night, she pinned a needle attached to a reel of thread on his kimono. The next day, she followed the thread to a cave. She heard mighty roars from within and called out to her lover, but he replied that his appearance was too frightening for her to behold. She remained persistent. Then, a great snake appeared with the needle attached to its throat. As soon as she laid her eyes on the snake, she and her companions scattered in terror. The following night, she gave birth to a son, Daida, who was raised by her grandfather in Bungo Province (now Ōita Prefecture).

The snake was thus the symbol of the Ogata clan under Ogata no Saburo Koreyoshi.

== Life ==
The Ogata clan's leader was originally a retainer of Taira no Shigemori. When the wars between the Taira and Minamoto began, Ogata no Saburo Koreyoshi switched sides after the Minamoto killed his rival Kikuchi Jiro, and his armies played the key role in securing Minamoto no Yoritomo's control of Japan by expelling the Taira from Kyūshū. It was Saburo who secured Prince Antoku and lead the main battle against the Taira at Dan-no-ura. He also helped to build the once famous Oka Castle for the first established shōgun of Japan..
