= Naoiri District, Ōita =

Former district in Ōita prefecture, Japan

Naoiri (直入郡, Naoiri-gun)

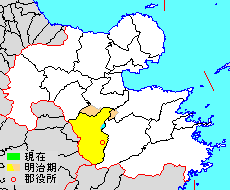
Location of the former Naoiri District in Ōita Prefecture, Japan.

was a district located in Ōita Prefecture, Japan.

As of 2003, the district had an estimated population of 10,956 and the density of 39.58 persons per km^{2}. The total area was 276.84 km^{2}.

== Former towns and villages ==
- Kujū
- Naoiri
- Ogi

== District Timeline ==
- On April 1, 2005 - the towns of Kujū, Naoiri and Ogi were merged into the expanded city of Taketa. Therefore, Naoiri District was dissolved as a result of this merger.
