= Kikuchi Takanao =

Japanese samurai and nobleman (d. 1185)

- 菊池 隆直
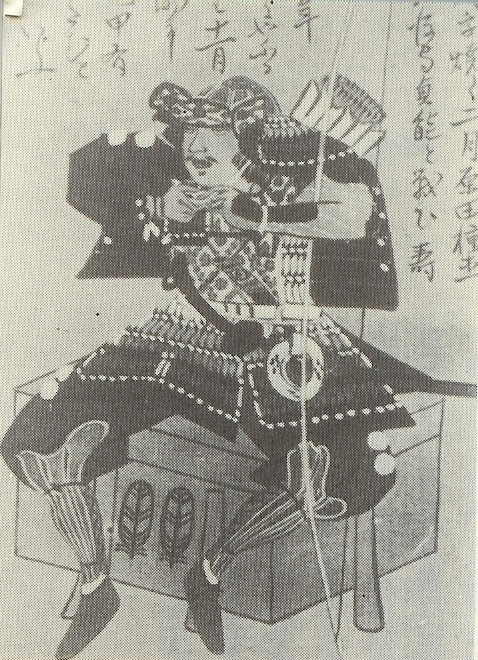
- Kikuchi Takanao
- Died: 1185; Rokujo riverbed, Japan
- Other names: Kikuchi no Jiro Takanao, Kikuchi Higo-Gon-no-Kami Takanao
- Occupation(s): Samurai, nobleman
- Known for: Support for Minamoto no Yoritomo in the Genpei War, execution by Minamoto no Yoshitsune

Kikuchi Takanao (菊池 隆直; died 1185) was a Japanese samurai and nobleman. He can also be referred to as Kikuchi no Jiro Takanao or Kikuchi Higo-Gon-no-Kami Takanao.

When Kikuchi Takanao sided with Minamoto no Yoritomo and began levying troops in Kyūshū in 1180, at the beginning of the Genpei War, Sadayoshi marched against him and defeated Takanao. Kikuchi Takanao was present at the Battle of Dan-no-ura. Shortly after the battle in the same year, he was turned over to Minamoto Yoshitsune by his lord Ogata no Saburo Koreyoshi. He was taken to the Rokujo riverbed and his head was cut off.

"One of your retainers, Kikuchi no Jiro Takanao, has been my enemy for years ... You may rely on me if you will turn Kikuchi over for execution." -Minamoto no Yoshitsune
