= Oka Castle =

Castle ruins in Taketa, Ōita, Japan

- 岡城
- Saiki, Ōita Japan
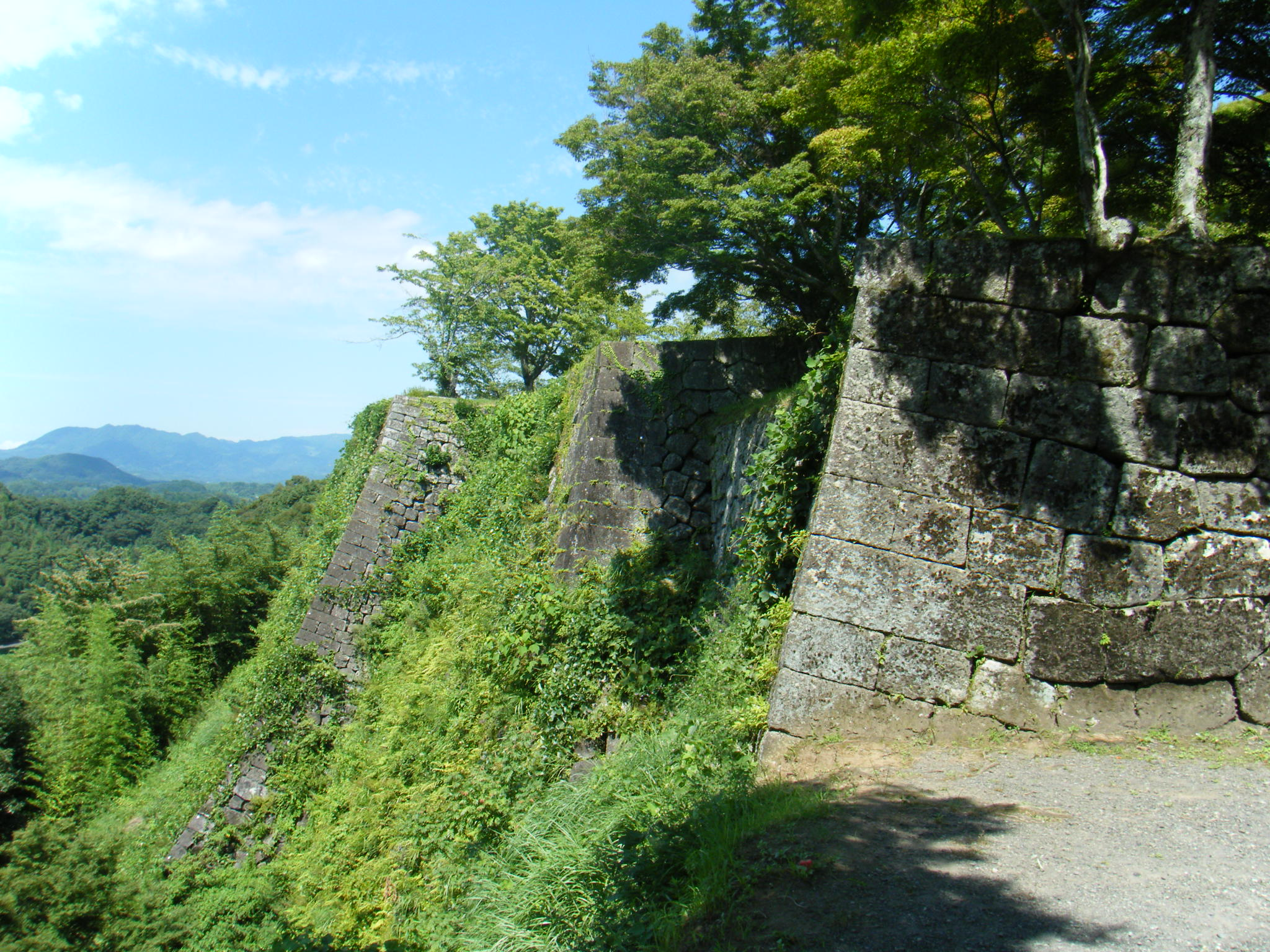
- Walls of Oka Castle

Site information
- Type: yamajiro-style Japanese castle
- Controlled by: Nakagawa clan
- Open to the public: yes
- Condition: Archaeological and designated national historical site; castle ruins
- Website: Official website

Location
- Coordinates: 32°58′9.18″N 131°24′29.05″E

Site history
- Built: c.1185
- Built by: Ogata Koreyoshi
- In use: Edo period
- National Historic Site of Japan

Oka Castle (岡城, Oka-jō) was a Sengoku to Edo period yamajiro-style Japanese castle located in the city of Taketa, Ōita Prefecture, Japan. Its ruins have been protected as a National Historic Site since 2023.

== Overview ==
Oka Castle is located on the top of Tenjinyama, a long hill to the east of the urban center of Taketa, which is situated in a small basin in the southwestern part of Bungo Province. It is at a crossroads of various roads crisscrossing the island of Kyushu and because of its geographical position, occupies an important strategic point controlling western Bungo Province. The site is flanked by two rivers, the Inaba River and the Tamaki River, tributaries of the Ōno River, which merge just to the east of the castle. The fortifications spread at the narrow east part of the hill, which has an elevation of 325 meters above sea level, and 95 meters above its surroundings. The castle extended 2500 meters from east-to-west and 362 meters from north-to-south.

It is uncertain when this location was fortified. According legend, it was constructed by Ogata Koreyoshi in 1185, and was gifted to Minamoto no Yoshitsune to be a stronghold against his brother, Minamoto no Yoritomo. After the death of Yoshitsune, the Ogata clan was exiled and their territories given to the Ōtomo clan, who has been sent as shugo of the province by the Kamakura shogunate. Shiga Sadatomo, from one of the three major cadet branches of the Ōtomo clan, expanded the fortifications in 1334 and renamed it "Oka Castle". On the other hand, the Bungo no Kunishi states that the Shiga clan entered this area only after 1364 and make Kimure Castle their stronghold, with no mention of Oka Castle, so this history remains uncertain.

Under the Shiga clan, Oka Castle served to protect Bungo against the Kikuchi clan in Higo Province. By the Sengoku period, the Ōtomo came to rule most of northern Kyushu. but under Ōtomo Sōrin were defeated by the Shimazu clan at the Battle of Mimikawa and other locations in Hyuga Province in 1578. By 1585, the Shimazu had burned the Ōtomo capital at Funai (modern Oita city) and a large army led by Shimazu Yoshihiro marched towards Oka Castle. Although many of the Ōtomo retainers defected to the Shimazu banner, Shiga Chikatsugu decided to resist and his 2000 men held Oka Castle successfully against a Shimazu army numbering over 30,000 men until the arrival of Toyotomi Hideyoshi. The Ōtomo were restored to control of Bungo Province; however, Ōtomo Yoshimune was subsequently accused of cowardice during the Japanese invasions of Korea (1592–1598) and was dispossessed. As retainers of the Ōtomo, the Shiga clan suffered the same fate, eventually becoming retainers of the Hosokawa clan. Hideyoshi appointed Nakagawa Hidenari, the son of Nakagawa Kiyohide, who had served Oda Nobunaga and Toyotomi Hideyoshi, and who had been awarded a 40,000 koku estate centered at Miki Castle in Harima Province. In 1594 Toyotomi Hideyoshi reassigned him to a new estate in centered on Oka Castle with an increase to 66,000 koku. Subsequent surveys reassessed the official kokudaka to 70,000 koku. During the Battle of Sekigahara in 1600, he remained loyal to the Eastern Army from the start of the campaign, and after the war, Tokugawa Ieyasu reconfirmed him in his existing holdings.Throughout the Edo period, the Nakagawa clan continued to rule Oka for 13 generations, without any transfer or reduction of territory.

The castle continued to be expanded over the years, until it eventually extended for over one kilometer along the crest of the hill, winding along its continues like an inverted letter "J". The castle consisted of three main portions: inner part, middle part and western part, separated by bottlenecks. The Y-shaped middle part consisted of the central enclosure, secondary enclosure and third enclosure, with the central enclosure 100 by 50 meters, and a containing a three-story yagura which was a substitute for the tenshu and additional yagura watchtowers on both sides. Each area was protected by curved tall stone walls are directly built on the body of the hill, topped by sheer stone walls, and securely protected by masugata-style combination gates at each bottleneck. The western portion consists of several large flat terraces, which were used as the residential area of the castle. It was also protected by yagura turrets, stone walls and combination gates, and in case of emergency could function as an independent castle. The main gate of the castle was located on the southern side of this area. The tenshu collapsed in an earthquake in 1769. Many of the buildings in the castle were destroyed by fire in 1771, which had originated in the castle town.

Following the Meiji restoration, the castle structures were all destroyed by 1873 and the site was abandoned. The composer Rentarō Taki was inspired by the ruins to write the song Kōjō no Tsuki, which became famous by being included in the required curriculum for junior high school students in 1901 (although the lyrics were actually referring to Aizuwakamatsu Castle instead of Oka Castle. The castle ruins are now a historic park. It is located a 25-minute walk from Bungo-Taketa Station on the JR Kyushu Hōhi Main Line. Oka Castle was listed as one of Japan's Top 100 Castles by the Japan Castle Foundation in 2006.

== Gallery ==
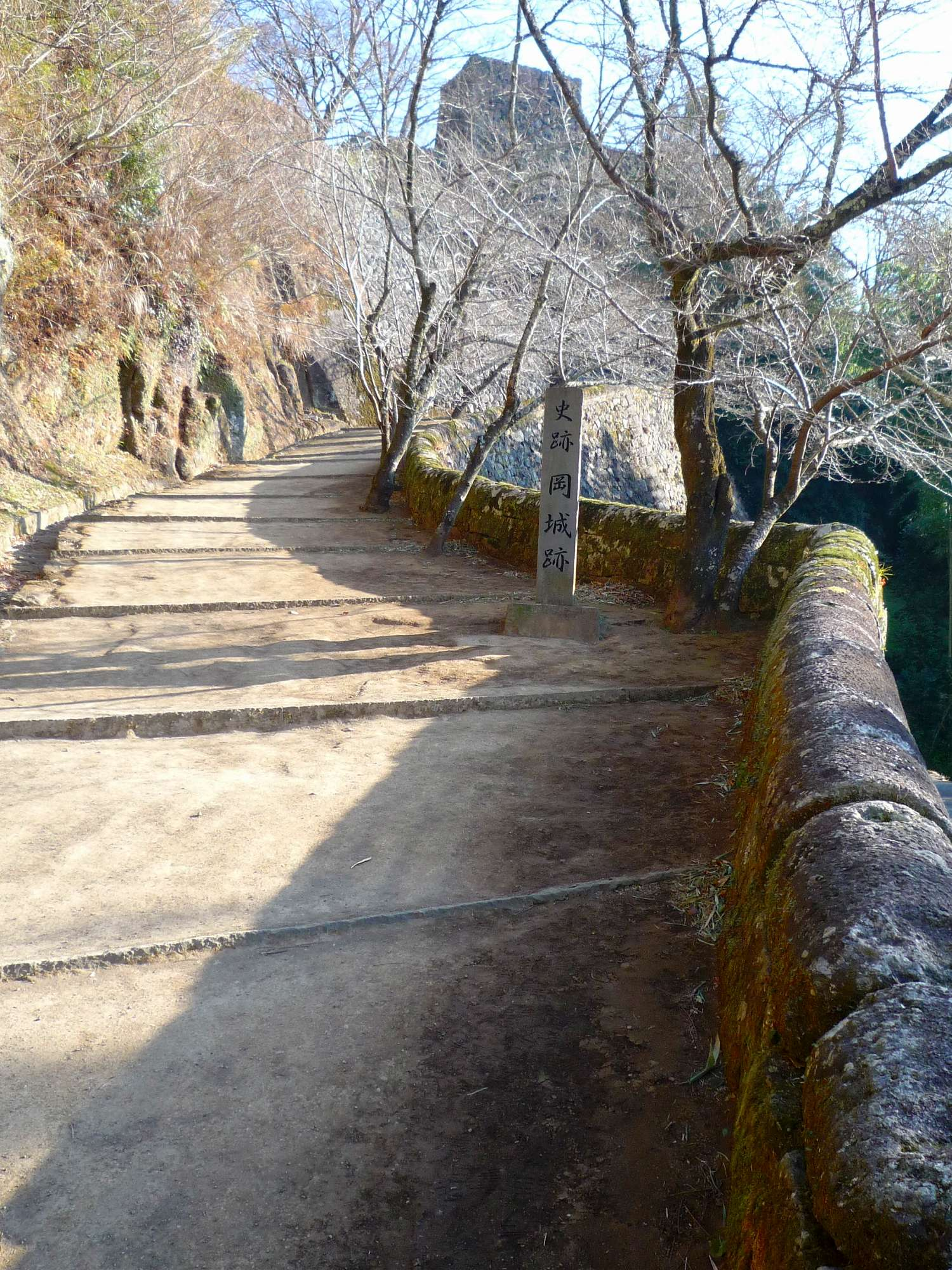
Approach to the castle ruins

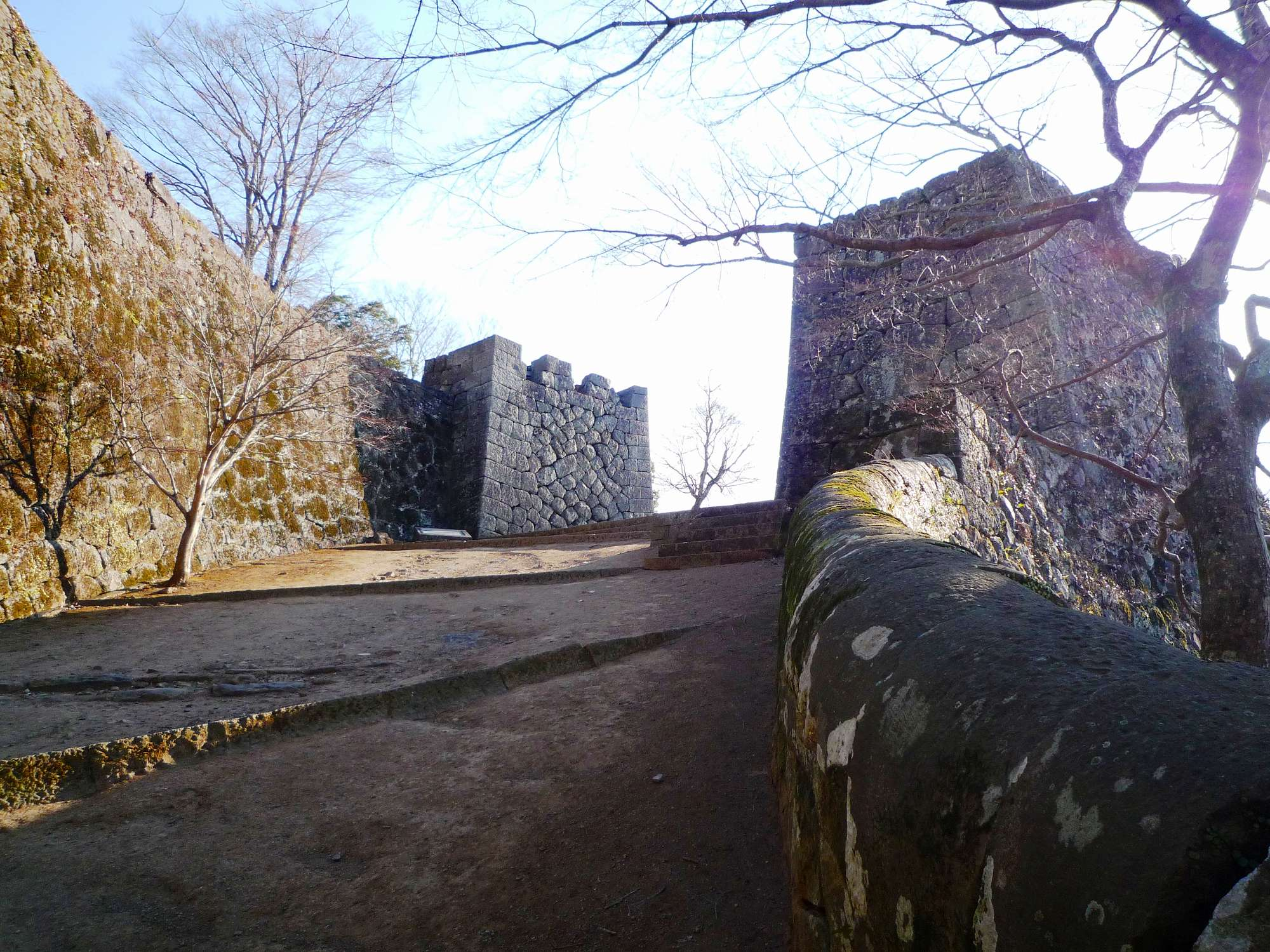
Site of the Otemon main gate

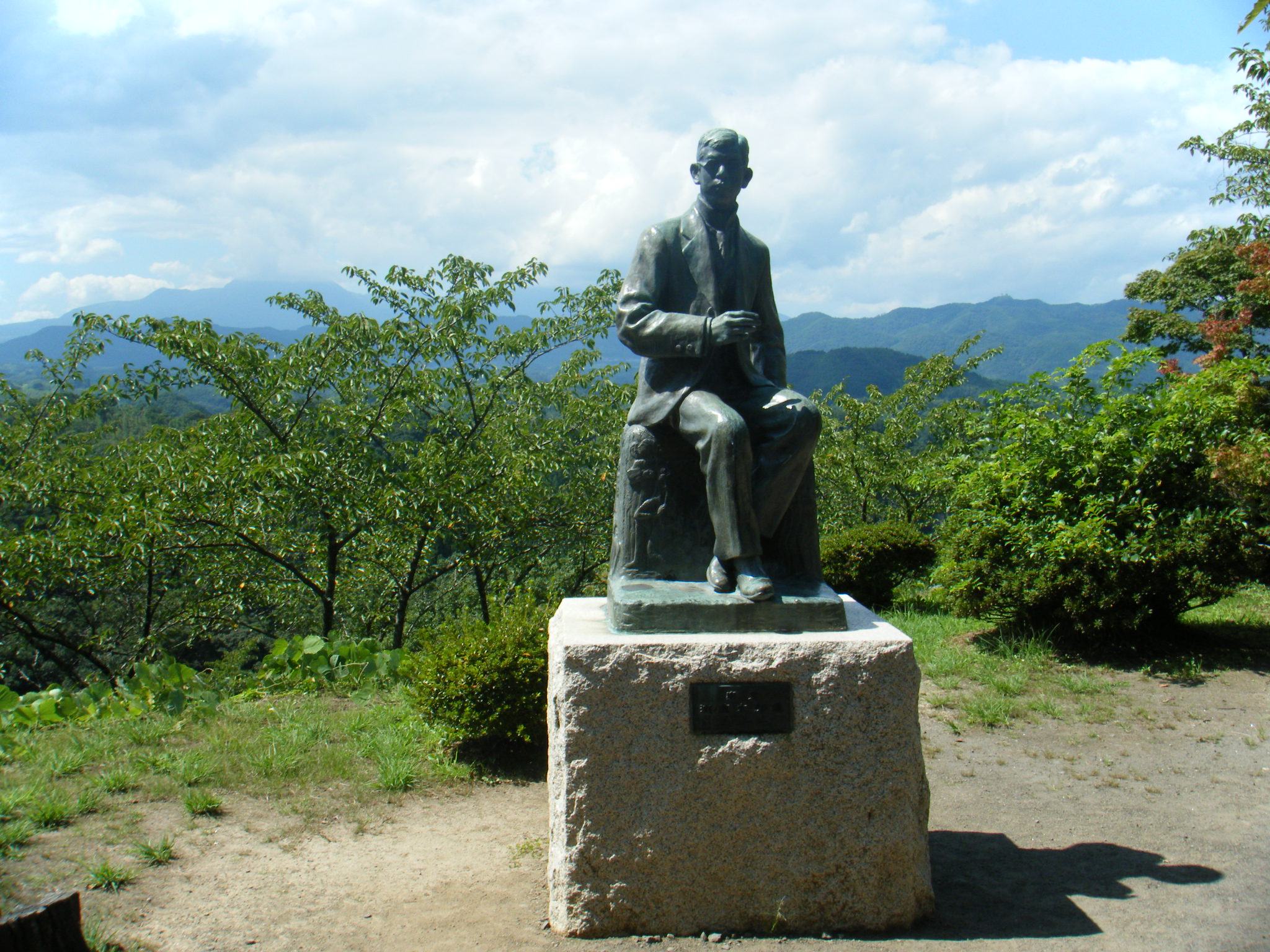
Statue of Rentarō Taki

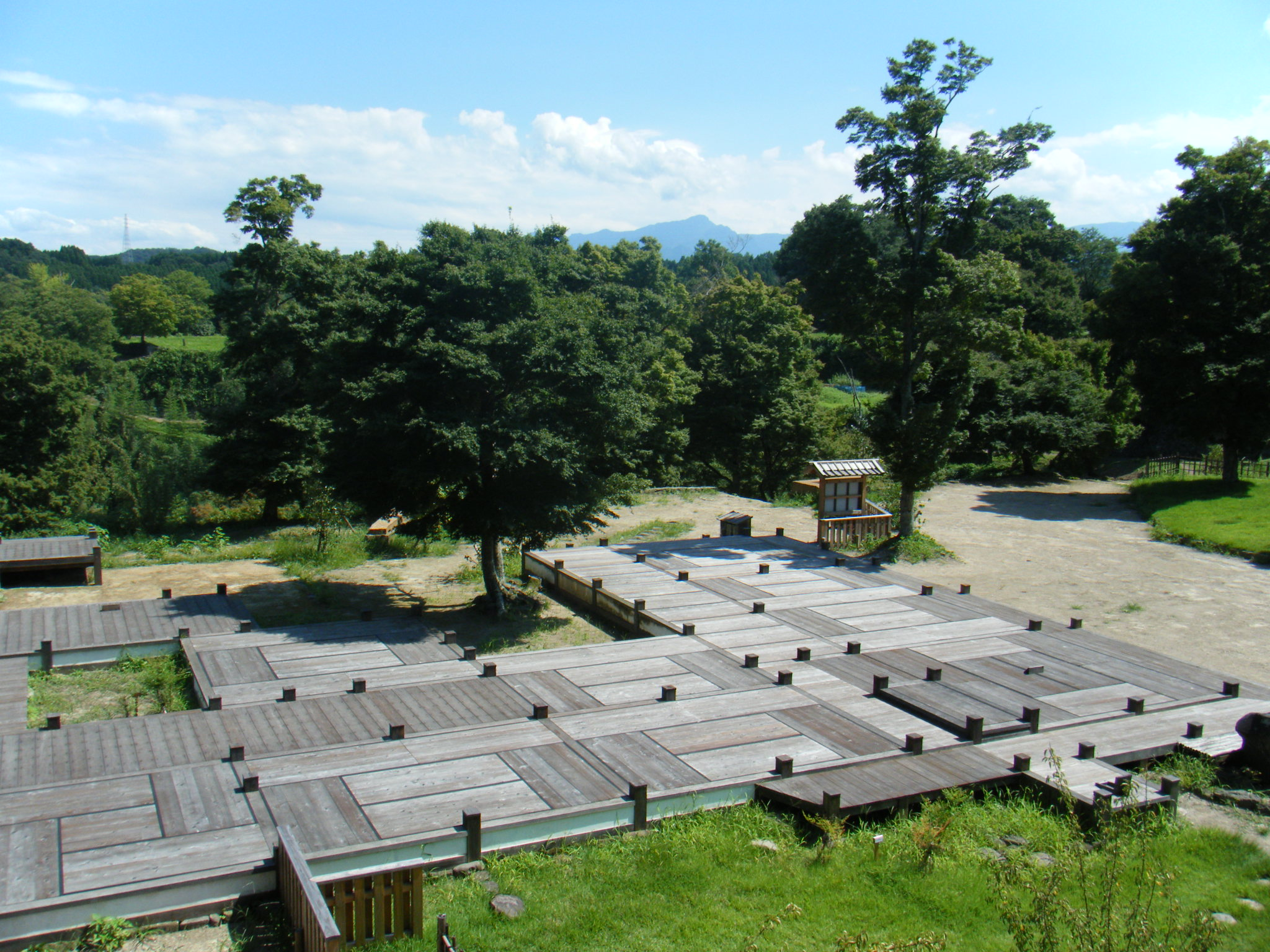
Site of the Nakagawa daimyo residence

== See also ==
- List of Historic Sites of Japan (Ōita)

== Literature ==
- Benesch, Oleg and Ran Zwigenberg (2019). Japan's Castles: Citadels of Modernity in War and Peace. Cambridge: Cambridge University Press. p. 374. ISBN 9781108481946.
- De Lange, William (2021). An Encyclopedia of Japanese Castles. Groningen: Toyo Press. pp. 600 pages. ISBN 978-9492722300.
