= Taira no Sadayoshi =

Gormer governor of Higo and Chikugo provinces in Kyūshū

Taira no Sadayoshi 平 貞能

governor of Higo provinces governor of Chikugo provinces
- Preceded by: Taira no Sadayoshi

“専一腹心の者” the trusted retainer of Taira no Kiyomori

Personal details
- Died: Komathu Temple in Ibaraki Prefecture
- Children: Taira no (Yamada) Sadanaga, the founder of the Kuroko clan
- Relatives: Taira no Ietsugu (brother)

Military service
- Rank: 家司(Majordomo of Taira clan 従五位
- Battles/wars: Heiji rebellion Genpei War

Taira no Sadayoshi (平 貞能) was a governor of Higo and Chikugo provinces in Kyūshū, and a samurai commander for the Taira clan during the Genpei War of the 1180s. Following the war, his life was spared as a result of an intercession by Utsunomiya Tomotsuna. He thus spent his retirement as a Buddhist monk, going by the appellation Higo-Nyūdo. His father was Taira no Iesada.

When Kikuchi Takanao sided with Minamoto no Yoritomo and began levying troops in Kyūshū in 1180, at the beginning of the Genpei War, Sadayoshi marched against him and defeated him. Sadayoshi then traveled to Kyoto, and met up with Taira no Munemori along with the Emperor Antoku on the Saikaidō road from the capital. He tried in vain to convince Munemori to return to the city, but ultimately left him to take care of the remains of Taira no Shigemori, which were brought to the sacred Mount Kōya.

Sadayoshi then reunited with Munemori and served under him for the remainder of the war. He was the only member of the Taira clan to be spared by the Minamoto after the war-ending battle of Dan-no-ura (though many other Taira samurai were not present at the battle or otherwise escaped death).
